= Caynton Caves =

Man-made caves in Shropshire, England

Coordinates: 52.623°N 2.329°W

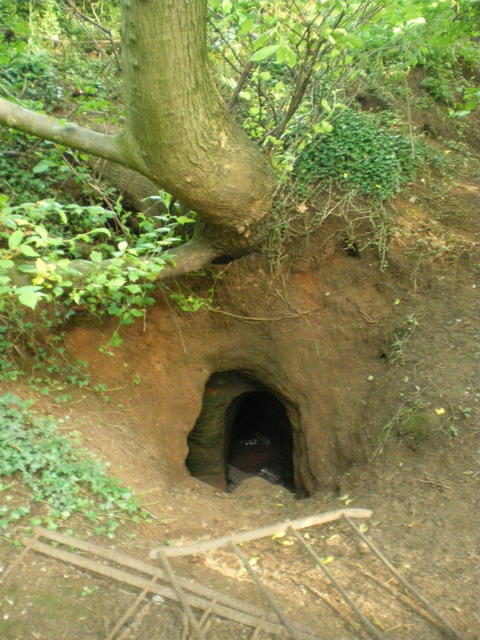
Entrance to the caverns

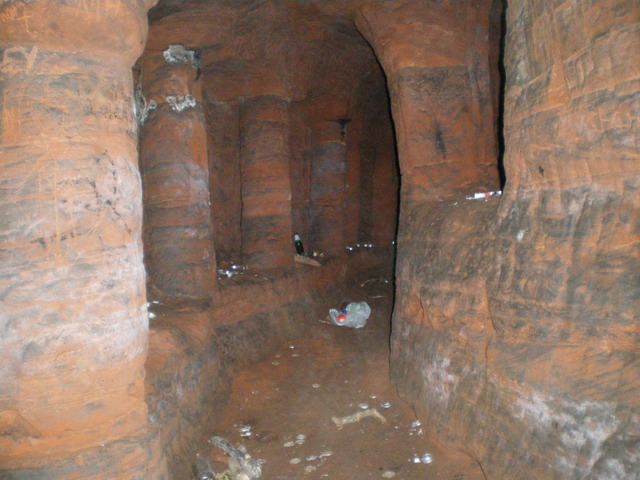
View within the cavern, 2009

The Caynton Caves are a series of man-made underground chambers in the grounds of Caynton Hall, near Beckbury, Shropshire, England. Their original purpose and date of construction are disputed, though most authoritative sources date them to the 19th century.

== Description and history ==
The caverns comprise an irregular series of neo-Romanesque ambulatories and chambers hollowed out of sandstone, with carved archways, pillars, symbols and niches, apparently for candles. They are located about 250 metres (820 ft) west of Caynton Hall, beneath privately owned woodland, within a disused stone quarry. One suggestion is that they were the result of quarrying during the mid-19th century and were then turned by the landowners, the Legge family, into a grotto or underground folly.

There have been speculative claims that the caverns are older, perhaps dating back at least to the 17th century, and some press articles have associated them with the Knights Templar. However, historian and author Dan Jones considers that there is no evidence linking the caves to the Templars and Historic England dates the grotto as probably late 18th-century or early 19th-century.

The site is on private land and not open to the public. However, since at least the 1980s, the caverns have sometimes been used for informal secret ceremonies and rituals. They have been vandalised and were closed off in 2012 as a result. Later unblocked, they were accessed by a photographer and received widespread publicity in March 2017.

== See also ==
- Listed buildings in Beckbury

== Location ==
52°37'38.2"N 2°12'48.8"W
