= Badger, Shropshire =

Village in Shropshire, England

Badger
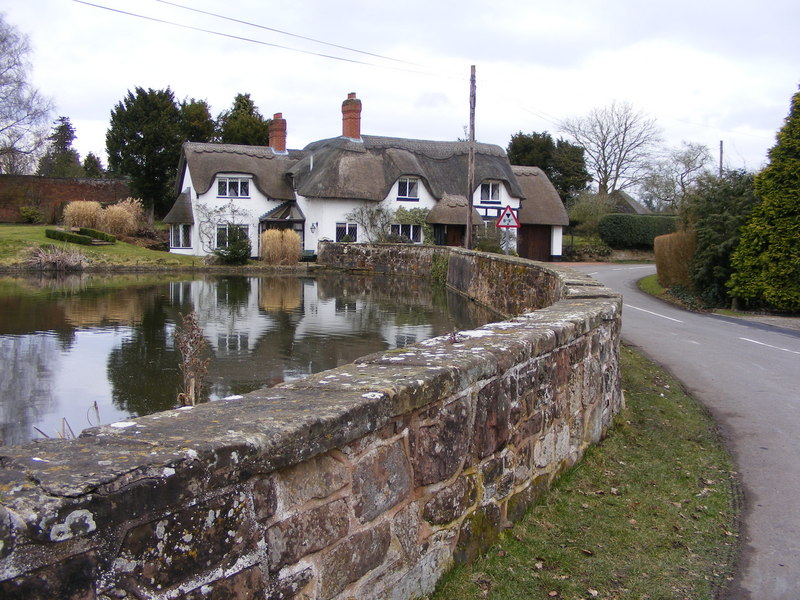
- Town Pool, in the village of Badger, Shropshire

- Location within Shropshire
- Population: 126 (2011)
- OS grid reference: SO768995
- Civil parish: Badger
- Unitary authority: Shropshire
- Ceremonial county: Shropshire
- Region: West Midlands
- Country: England
- Sovereign state: United Kingdom
- Post town: Wolverhampton
- Postcode district: WV6
- Dialling code: 01746
- Police: West Mercia
- Fire: Shropshire
- Ambulance: West Midlands
- UK Parliament: Ludlow

Badger is a village and civil parish in Shropshire, England, about six miles north-east of Bridgnorth. The parish had a population of 134 according to the 2001 census, falling to 126 at the 2011 census.

Badger Parish is at grid map reference SO 768 995. The boundaries of the parish contain the village of Badger, one side of Badger Dingle, and Badger Heath Farm. It is approximately 2.7 km at its widest point.

The village and its surroundings, particularly the Dingle, are considered a visitor attraction. In their present form they owe much to deliberate planning and landscaping in the 18th century.

== Etymology ==
Badger has its origin in the Old English language of the Anglo-Saxons. It has no connection with the mammal, spelled similarly: as late as the 1870s, the alternative spelling Bagsore was current. The late Margaret Gelling, a specialist in Midland toponyms, formerly based at the University of Birmingham separates it into two separate elements:

- The first element in the name, Bæcg, is an Anglo-Saxon personal name – perhaps one of the Angles who came to settle in the evolving kingdom of Mercia, and shared with Beckbury.

- The second element, ofer signifies a hill spur. In a detailed discussion of this latter term, Gelling admits that it is a conjectural reconstruction of a word that never occurs separately, but is a common part of place-names, with the main concentration being in Derbyshire, Staffordshire, Shropshire and Herefordshire. It has often been construed simply as a hill or ridge, but Gelling's detailed examination of sites suggests a more precise significance: that the place is on or close to a long, narrow ridge, perhaps jutting from a larger ridge. At Badger, "the settlement lies to the E. of an appropriate hill-spur.". There is indeed a spur, rising up behind Badger Farm, with a slope to the south-east enfolding the village and running down to the Dingle, while the western slope descends to the River Worfe.

== History ==
=== Medieval origins ===
As its name suggests, the origins of the village of Badger seem to lie in the Anglo-Saxon period. The first real evidence comes from the Domesday survey of 1086, which compared the situation at that point with that before the Norman Conquest. The entry translates:

"Osbern, son of Richard, holds BADGER from Earl Roger, and Robert from him.
Bruning held it; he was a free man.
1/2 hide which pays tax. Land for 2 ploughs. In lordship 1 plough; 4 smallholders with 1 plough. Woodland for fattening 30 pigs.
The value was 7s; now 10s."

This indicates the pre-Conquest Anglo-Saxon owner was Bruning, who got 10s. a year from it. It had since fallen in value, like most northern and Midland villages, and belonged to Roger de Montgomerie, 1st Earl of Shrewsbury. Osbern fitz Richard, baron of Richard's Castle, was one of Roger's vassals and held it as a fief. However, he let it to someone called Robert.

To the four smallholders or bordars, their families must be added, but the population was obviously very small. A hide had been a unit of area, but by this stage it was simply a way of expressing liability to tax. Half a hide is a very small assessment. Badger was a long way down the territorial scale, its manor run by a man two levels below the regional magnate, Earl Roger.

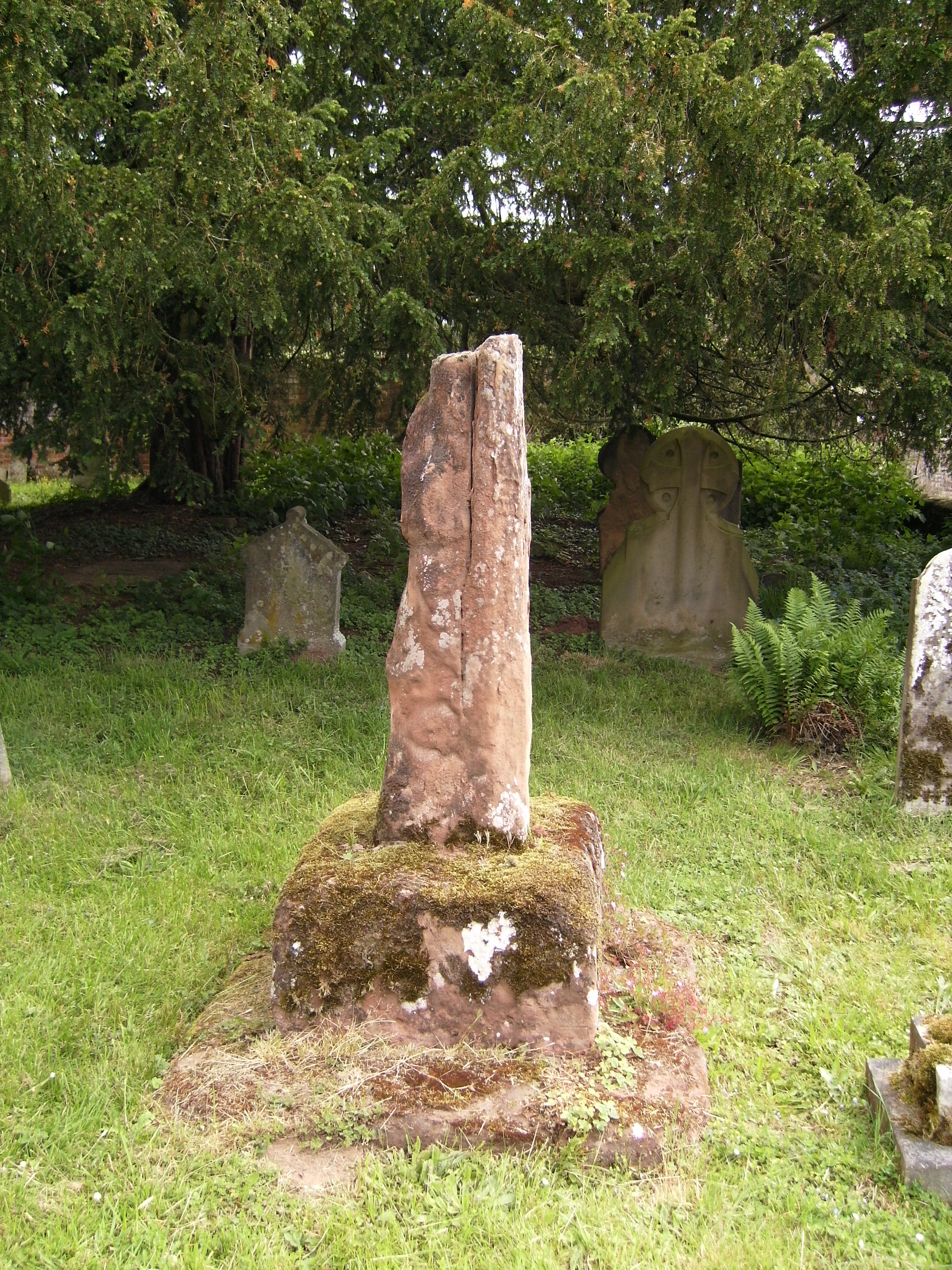
Headless cross, which probably stood at the centre of the village, now in the churchyard. It is thought to date from the 14th or 15th century.

A little later, in the early 12th century, under Henry I, Earl Roger's son, Robert, lost his earldom and the barons of Richard's Castle are at the top of the pyramid (beneath the king, of course). The history of the lordship is rather convoluted, but by the end of the 12th century, the immediate overlord was the Prior of Wenlock.

The history of the actual occupiers or "terre tenants" of the manor is a little less complicated. William de Badger was the tenant in the mid-12th century, and he sold up to one Philip, who is soon also known as de Badger. After that it passed from father to son for nearly two centuries, until 1349, and stayed within the same family until 1402, when Alice, widow of John de Badger, died without issue. Thereafter there was a complex situation of shares in the manor held by members of the Elmbridge family, until Dorothy Kynnersley née Elmbridge conveyed it to her son, Thomas Kynnersley, in 1560.

The medieval village was probably surrounded by open fields, although there is no direct evidence of them until the 17th century, on the eve of their enclosure. At that point the fields were called Batch and Middle fields and Uppsfield. It was surrounded by woods to the west and north and heathland to the east. The layout was probably very similar to the modern pattern. The church, rectory and hall form a group, and the rest of the village is strung along the road to the south of them.

The village probably acquired a church and a priest in the mid-12th century. By 1246, the living was known as a rectory. The lord of the manor, that is the terre tenant, had the right to nominate his choice of priest to the Prior of Wenlock, although he had to pay the prior 3s. 4d. a year for the right. However, Wenlock was a Cluniac house and so classed as an alien priory, the daughter house of an abbey in France. Hence it was constantly seized by the Crown during the Hundred Years War, so nominations were actually sent to the Crown for most of the 14th century. Because of the Wenlock connection, Badger and the neighbouring parish of Beckbury formed an exclave of the Diocese of Hereford – an anomaly that persisted until 1905, when it was transferred to the Diocese of Lichfield. Several of the early incumbents seem to have been sons of the lord of the manor or of the lords of Beckbury. The rector lived on tithes and Easter offerings, and also had an area of glebe land and, for some centuries, the rent of a house inhabited by the Blakemans.

=== Early modern Badger ===
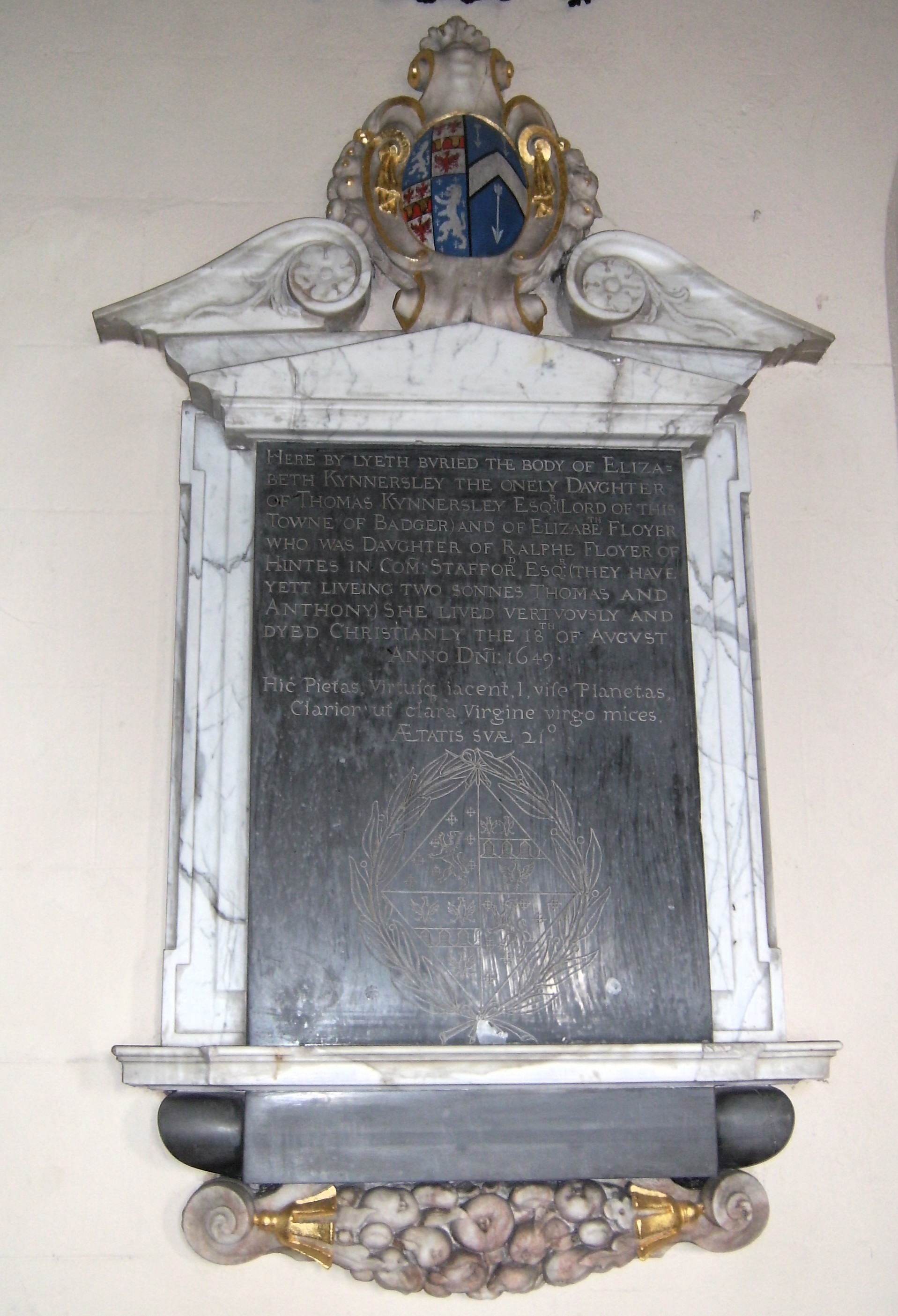
Memorial to Elizabeth Kynnersley, who died in 1649, the oldest memorial in the parish church.

Under the Kynnersleys, the manor again stayed in the same family for more than two centuries. An early challenge to their control came in the form of a royal appointment to the rectory. Since the dissolution of the monasteries, advowson or the right to present an incumbent had technically belonged to the Crown, but the old arrangement, by which the lord of the manor made the initial nomination, still held. Indeed, the Elmbridges and the Kynnersleys alike had continued to pay their annual dues to preserve it. In 1614, James I presented Richard Froysall to the rectory, without consulting the lord of the manor, Francis Kynnersley. Francis fought back. First he tried to stop Froysall entering the church and ordered the parishioners not to attend. Then he cut off economic support, seizing Froysall's tithes and planting trees on the glebe. He swore he would cut off Froysall's head and throw it in Badger Pool. He managed to get the rector imprisoned at Shrewsbury. However, Froysall apparently had some supporters, and they made off with some of Francis's oxen.

Francis seems to have done enough to vindicate his claims. The Kynnersley lords slowly crept up the social scale, serving their locality in various capacities. Thomas Kynnersley was High Sheriff of Staffordshire and later High Sheriff of Shropshire under the Commonwealth, and his grandson John was High Sheriff of Shropshire under George I. Around 1719, John Kynnersley demolished the old timber-framed manor house and built a new hall, a substantial but unpretentious building with six ground floor rooms, just to the north of the old site.

Starting in 1662, the whole agricultural organisation of Badger was transformed. Firstly a large part of the east of the parish was hived off as a separate estate: Badger Heath, which for more than a century was farmed by the Taylor family, before being sold to the Greens in 1796. Then a large area of common land was divided up among the cultivators. Some time after this the open field system was abandoned and the land enclosed. Heathland was cleared and ploughed up: by 1748, even the Heath estate was half arable and had only 3% heathland. This set the pattern which has persisted to this day. Despite concentration of holdings, Badger's landscape remains mainly one of farms, predominantly arable but with considerable pasturage.

The population of Badger evidently remained small. In the mid-17th century the adult population seems to have been less than 50. With such a small population, most of the rectors decided they need devote only a small part of their time to the parish. In most cases, they chose to live elsewhere and combined Badger with other posts of greater profit. Thomas Hartshorn was rector from 1759 to 1780. For most of that time he also held two prebends under the peculiar jurisdiction of St. Peter's Collegiate Church, Wolverhampton: Hatherton, near Cannock and Monmore, near Wolverhampton.

John Kynnersley died without issue and passed the manor to his unmarried brother, Clement, who died in 1758. It then passed to his nephew, also called Clement, of Loxley. Both Clements had their own property near Uttoxeter and neither lived in Badger. They rented the manor house to an ironmaster, William Ferriday. So, for many years, both the lords of the manor and the rectors were absentees, rarely seen in the village. The second Clement decided to sell Badger in 1774.

=== Making of the modern village ===
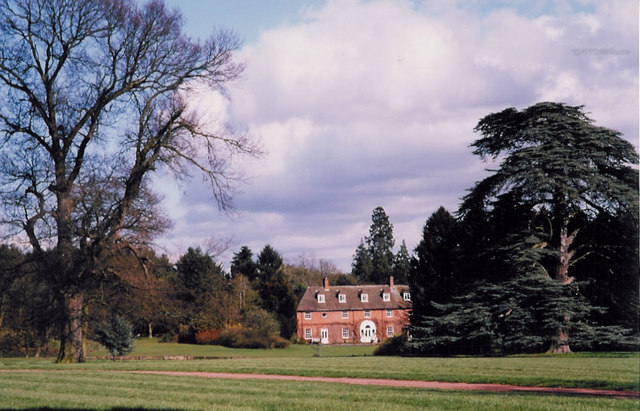
Badger Hall site today. The hall itself was demolished in 1953. The visible building is a former gatehouse.

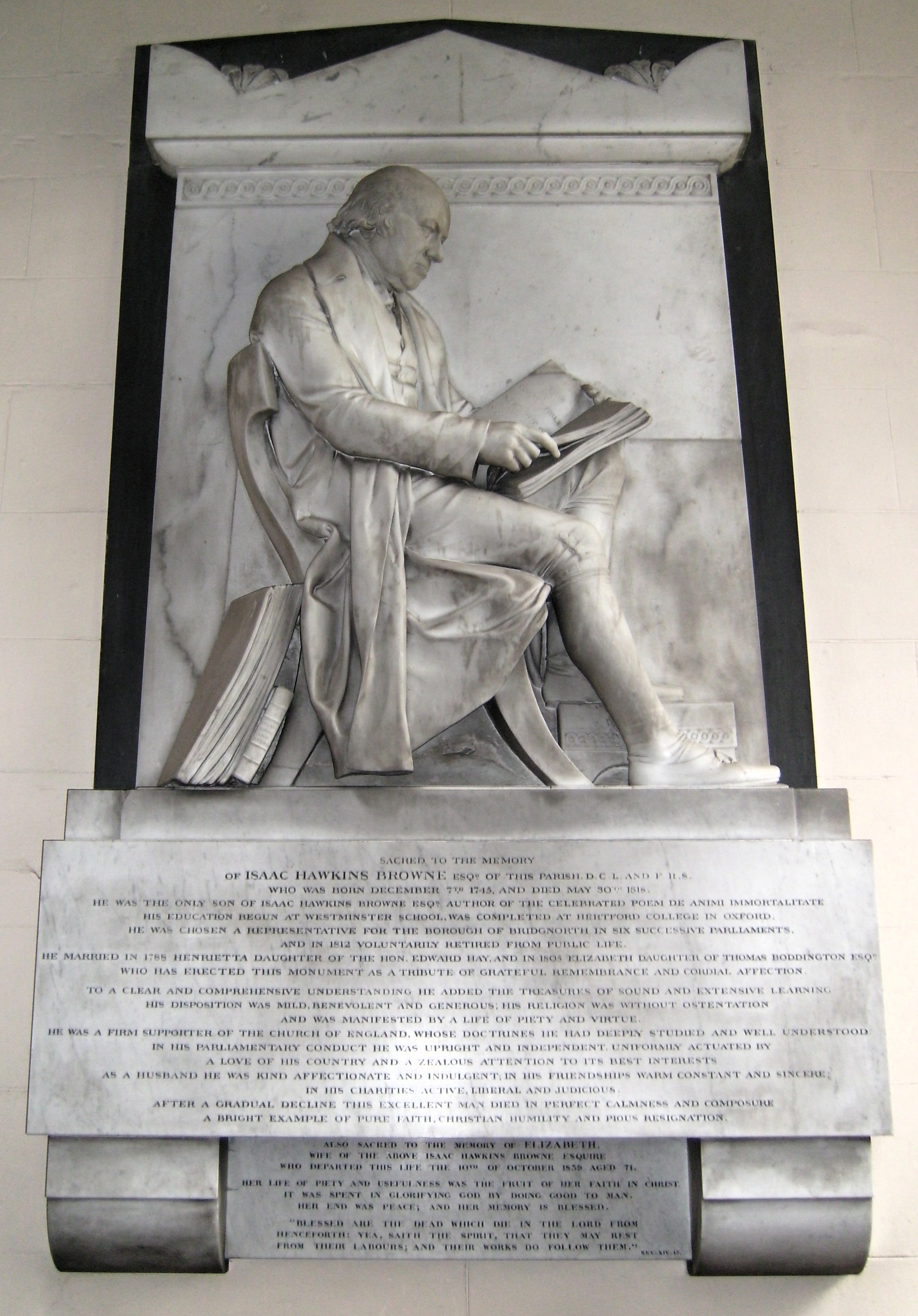
Memorial to Isaac Hawkins Browne and his second wife, Elizabeth, by Francis Leggatt Chantrey, in St. Giles' church, Badger.

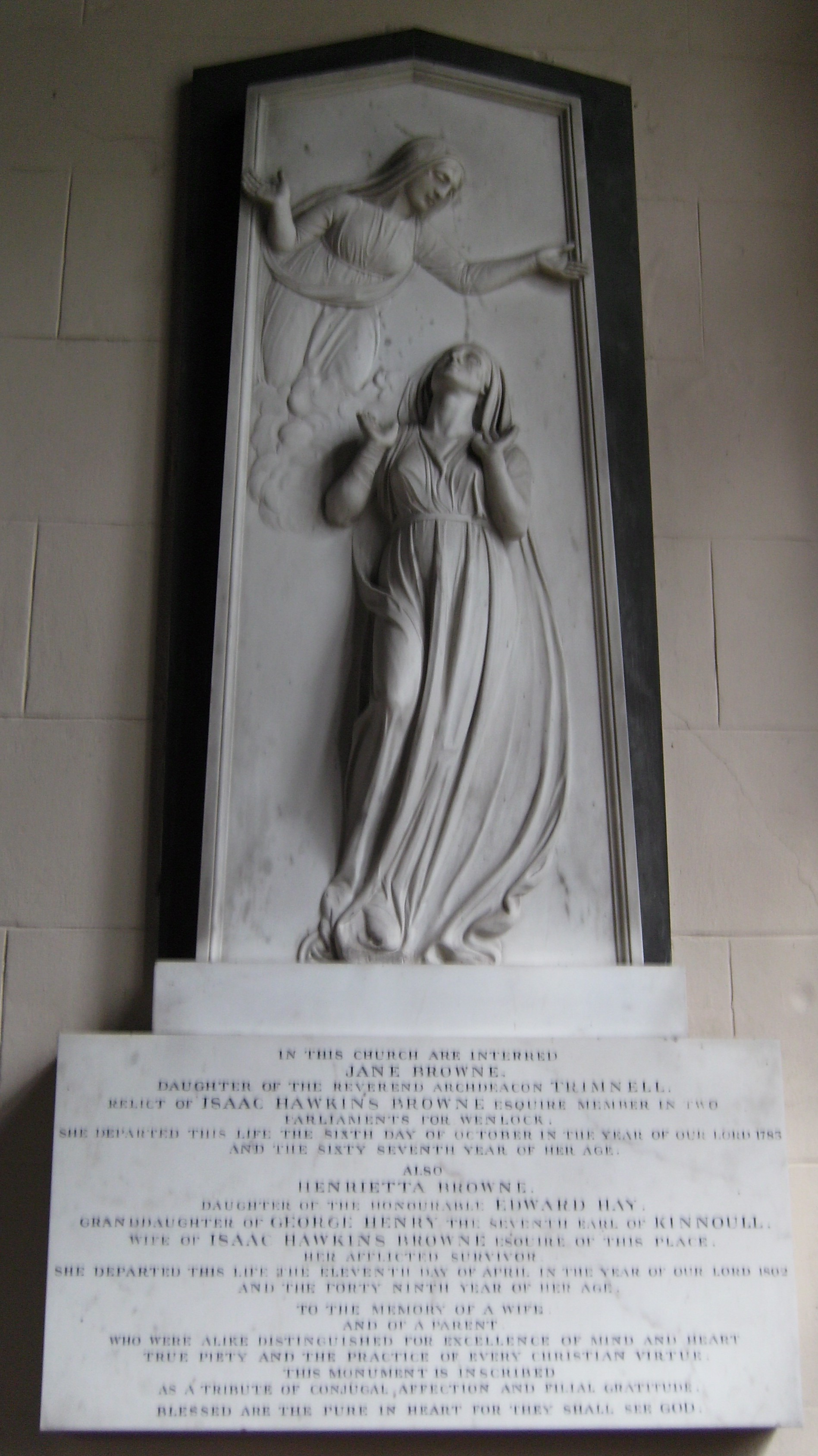
Memorial to Browne's mother and first wife in Badger parish church, by John Flaxman.

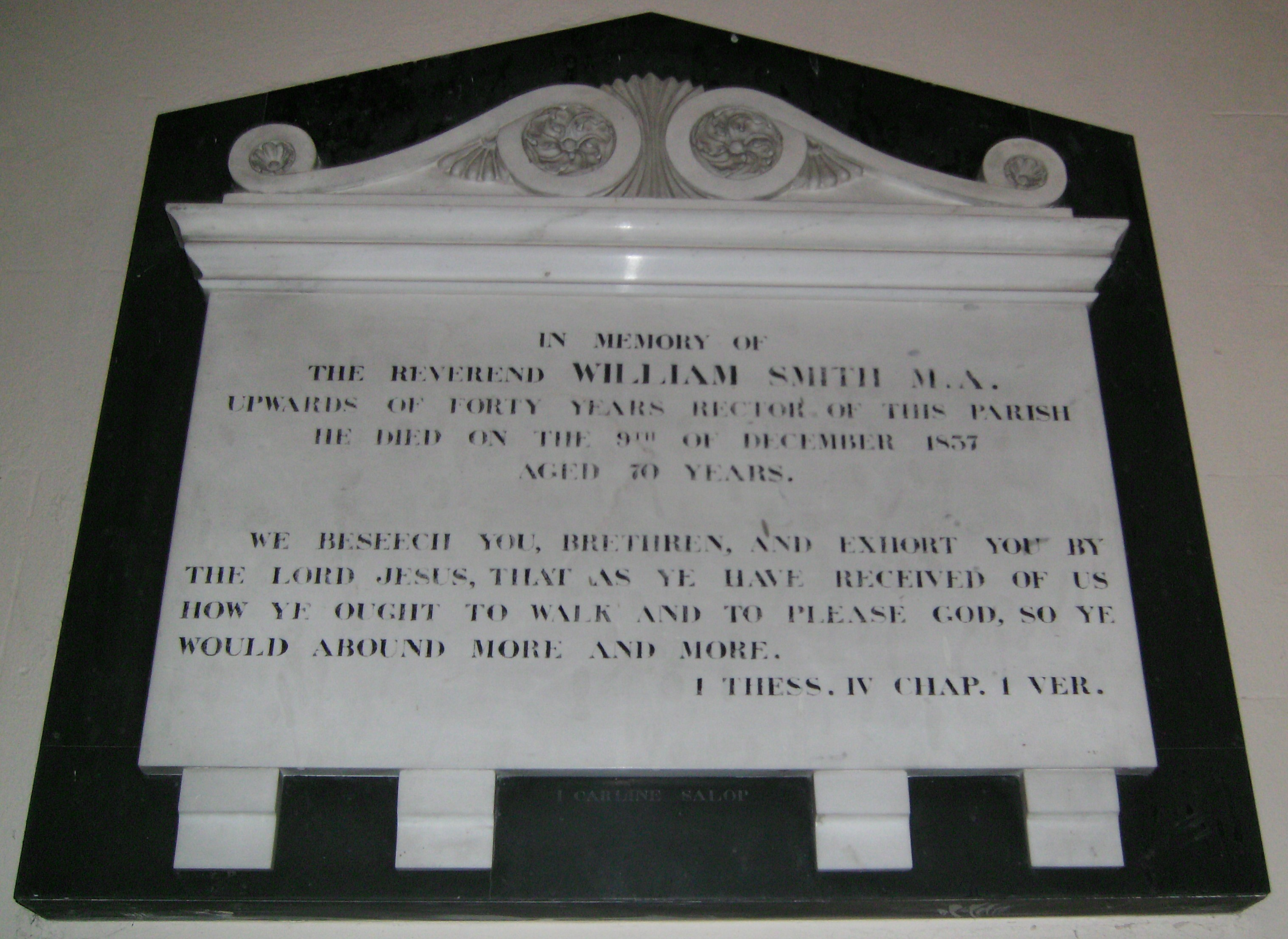
Memorial to Rev. William Smith, Browne's nominee as rector.

The buyer was Isaac Hawkins Browne, a Derbyshire industrialist and a Tory politician. Returning from the Grand Tour, Browne set about living the life of a country gentleman on his Shropshire estates at Badger and at Malinslee, near Dawley. He worked on his father's writings, helping to get his poetry recognised. Browne ingratiated himself with the local gentry, serving as High Sheriff for 1783 and as member of parliament for the pocket borough of Bridgnorth, a fiefdom of the Whitmore family of Dudmaston Hall from 1784 until 1812.

Browne spent heavily on the Hall. Between 1779 and 1783, he had it greatly extended, to a design by James Wyatt, with a museum, library, and conservatory, elaborate plasterwork by Joseph Rose, and paintings by Robert Smirke. Browne then turned his attention to the landscape. However, it was in his work on the landscape that Browne made his biggest and most permanent mark on the appearance of the village and its surroundings. He had the dell along the Batch Brook, on the south edge of the village, improved to a plan by William Emes and probably his pupil, John Webb. This reshaped Badger Dingle was a notable example of the picturesque style in landscaping. It had two miles of walks, with a walk linking it to Badger Hall from its east end, cascades created by damming the brook, a "temple" and other architectural features. It seems that the pools in the village itself, which drain into the Dingle, were enlarged and reshaped at this time.

Browne was a generous landlord and employer, instituting coal allowances for the villagers and help for the poor. It was probably he who initiated and financed the main village school: this was paid for by the lords of the manor and provided primary education for the village children and others, until 1933.

Browne was also keen to ensure that the parish was better served spiritually. None of the rectors had actually lived in the parish for at least a century and communion was celebrated only four or five times a year. This was an issue that clearly troubled Browne for many years: one of his rare parliamentary speeches was in favour of compelling absent clergy to pay for replacement curates. Dr. James Chelsum, a minor scholar, was the rector from 1780. He contrived to combine his benefice at Badger with the rectory of Droxford in Hampshire from 1782, and a chaplaincy at Lathbury in Buckinghamshire. Although Browne must initially have trusted Chelsum, he clearly became disenchanted and arranged for his departure in 1795. Chelsum retained his other benefices until he died insane in 1801. In Chelsum's place Browne nominated William Smith, who proved a conscientious minister for 42 years. Smith was never absent from the parish for more than two weeks in the whole of his incumbency. Browne must have valued Smith greatly, as he bequeathed him the right to nominate his own successor. In the event, Smith sold the right back to Browne's widow in 1820 for £1200.

Brown's first wife was Henrietta Hay, daughter of Edward Hay, a career diplomat, and granddaughter of George Hay, 8th Earl of Kinnoull. In 1802 she died and, the following year, he married Elizabeth, daughter of Thomas Boddington, a notorious apologist for the slave trade. When he died in 1818, he left a lifetime's interest in the hall to his wife, who lived for another 21 years. She continued Brown's benefactions, making sure the school continued. She also contributed the greater part of the cost of rebuilding the parish church, dedicated to St. Giles. In 1833, work began on the rebuilding, to a design by Francis Halley of Shifnal. The chancel and nave were reconstructed without division, under a single pitched roof, while a tower stood at the western end, above the entrance. The old materials were used where possible, although more sandstone was quarried on the estate to complete the work. Five years later, a new rectory completed the rebuilding. However, when William Smith died in 1837, Elizabeth nominated a relative, Thomas F. Boddington, as his successor. He lived for at least part of his incumbency at Shifnal.

The parish church of St. Giles

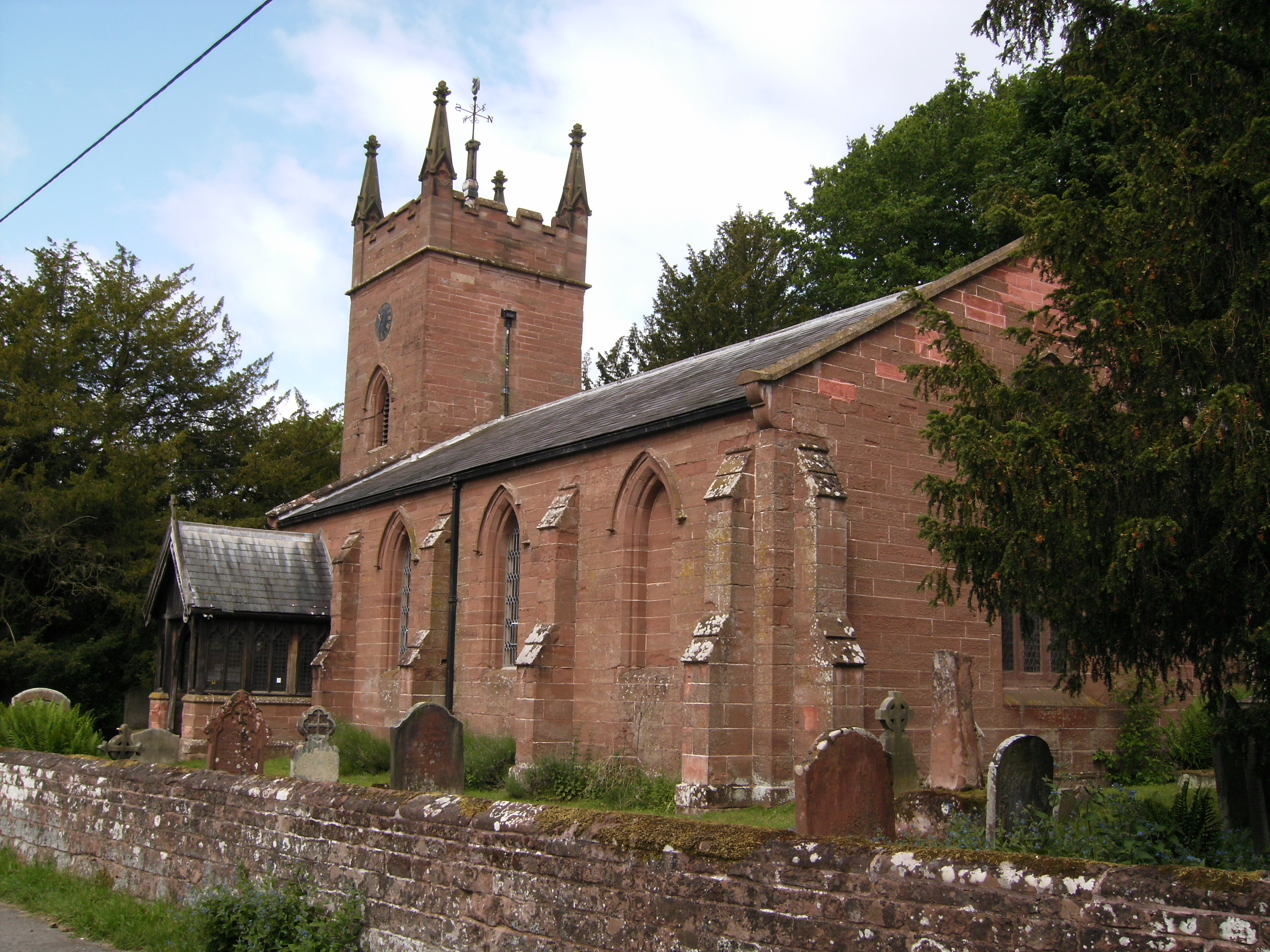
General view of the church from the south east, showing the single pitched roof construction of chancel and nave.

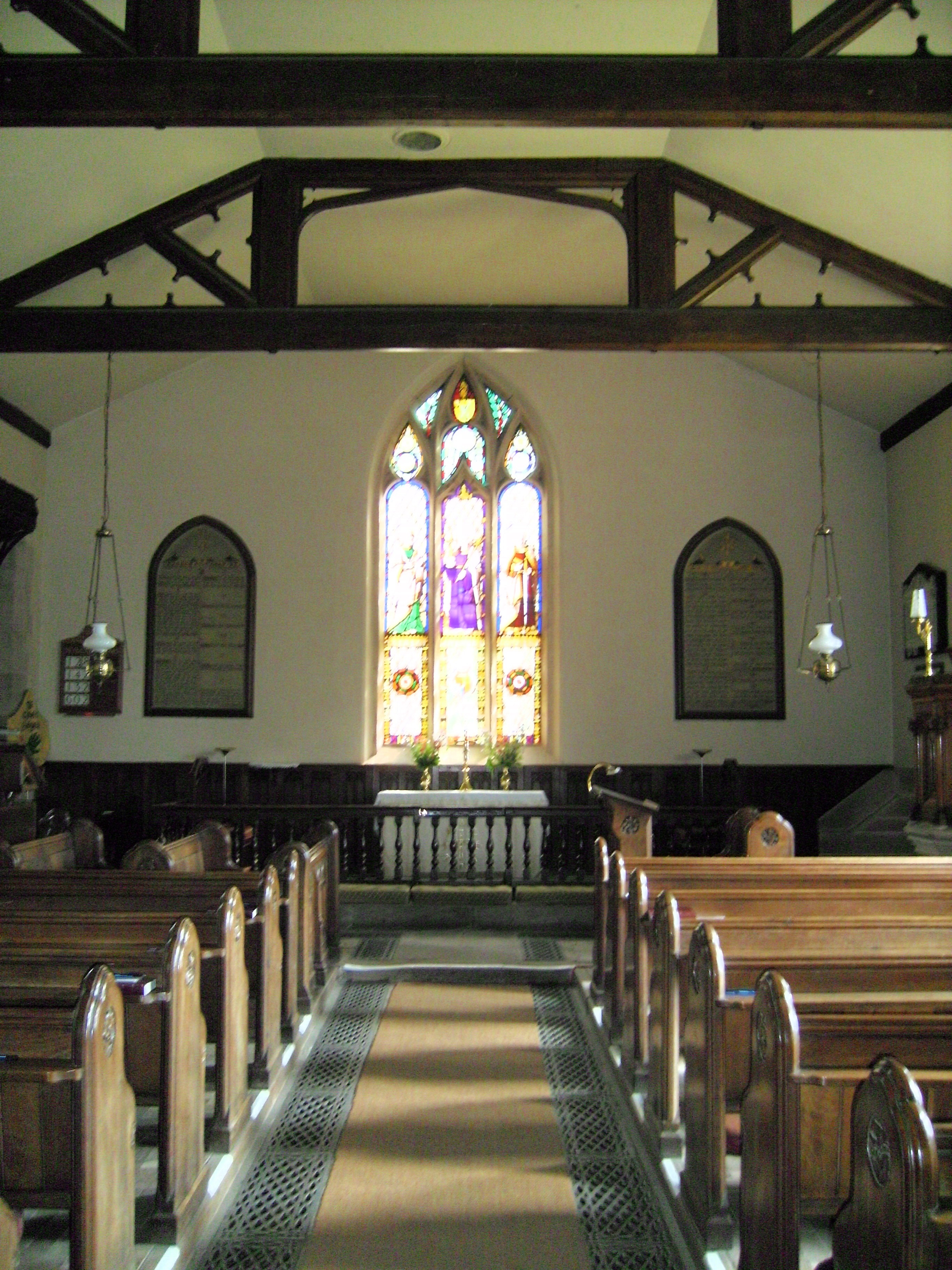
Interior of the church from the western end of the nave.

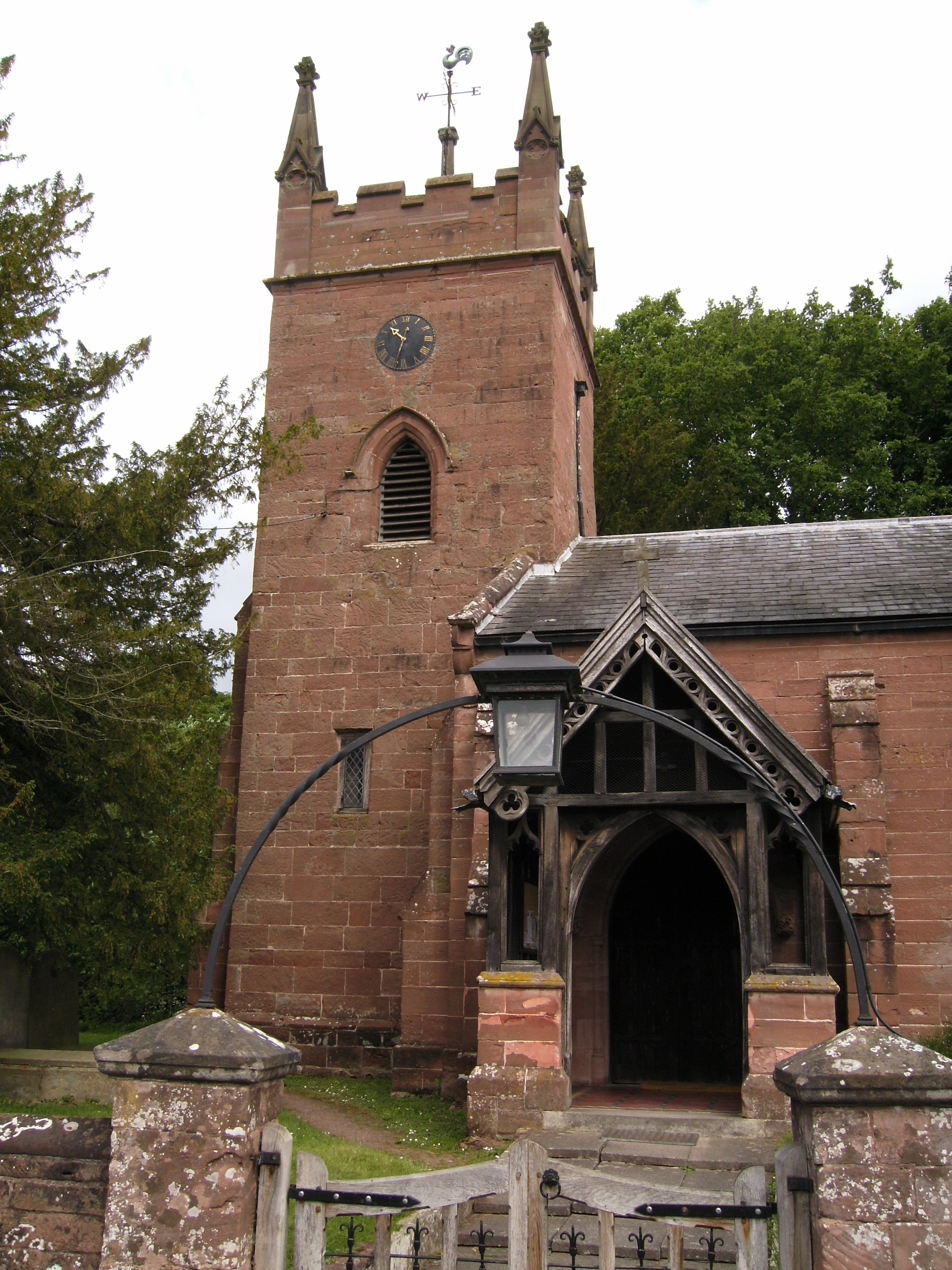
The west tower and porch.

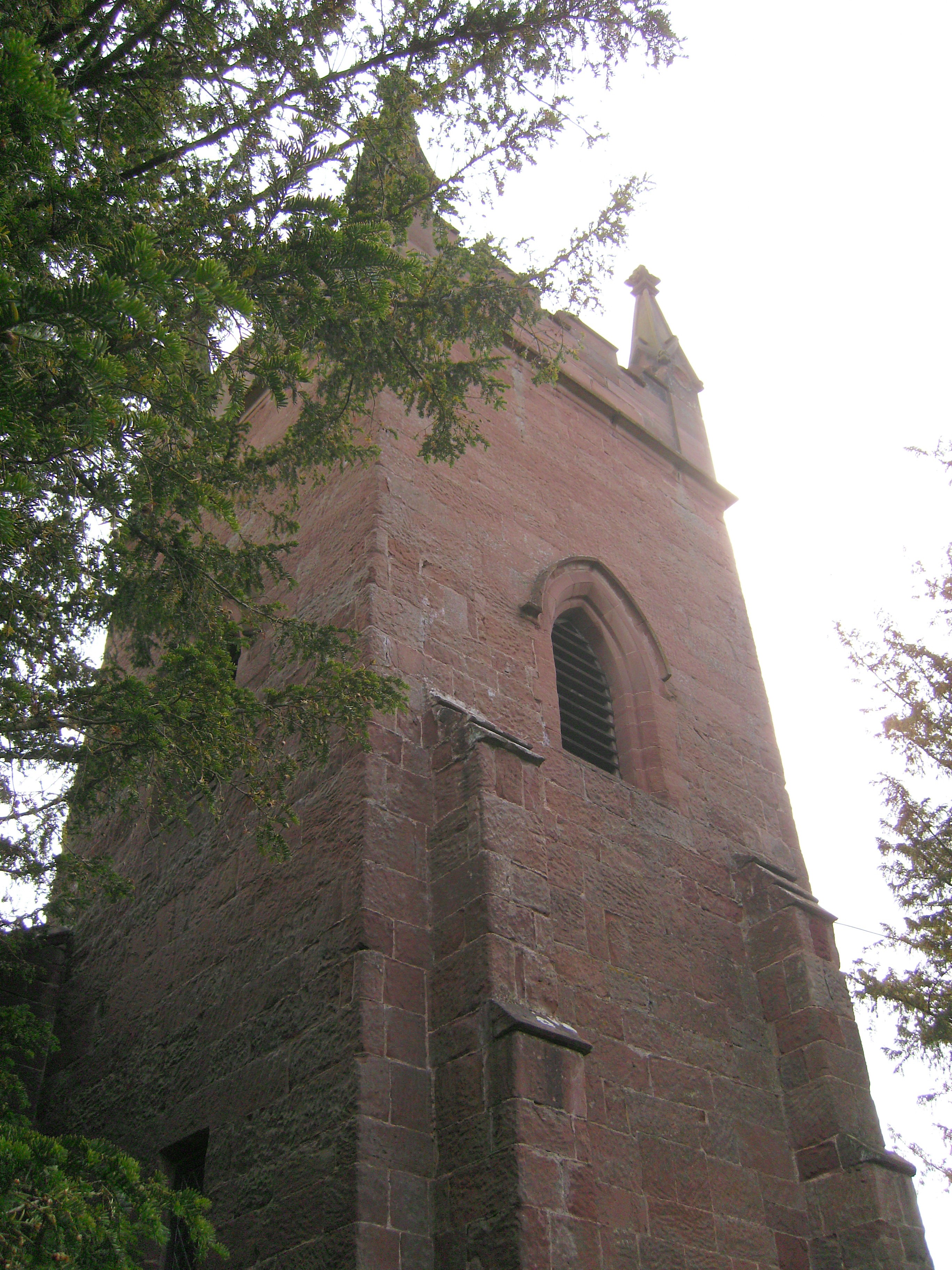
The west tower. It was this that gave most cause for concern before the rebuilding.

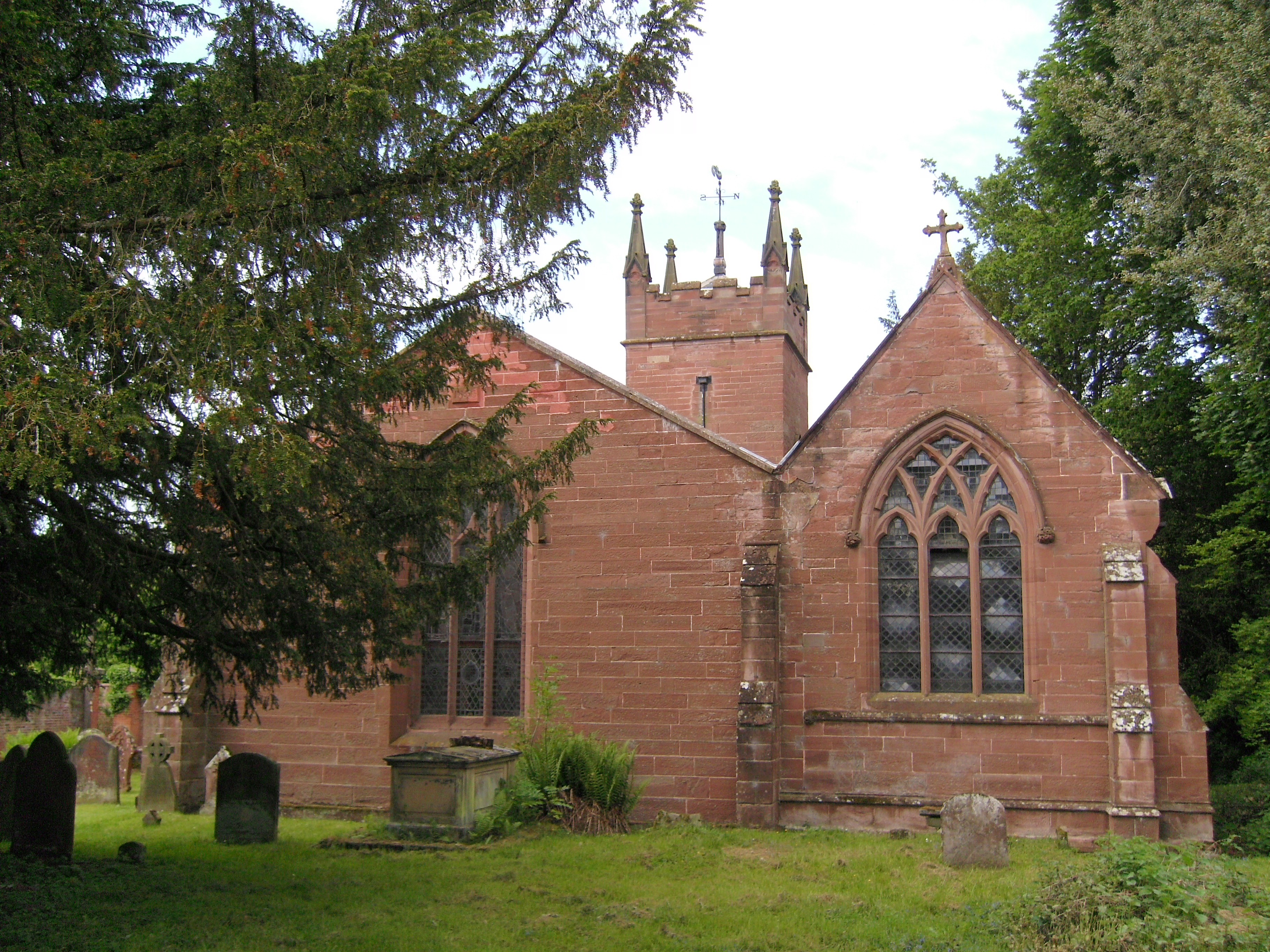
View of the church from the east, showing Capel Cures' north chapel to the right.

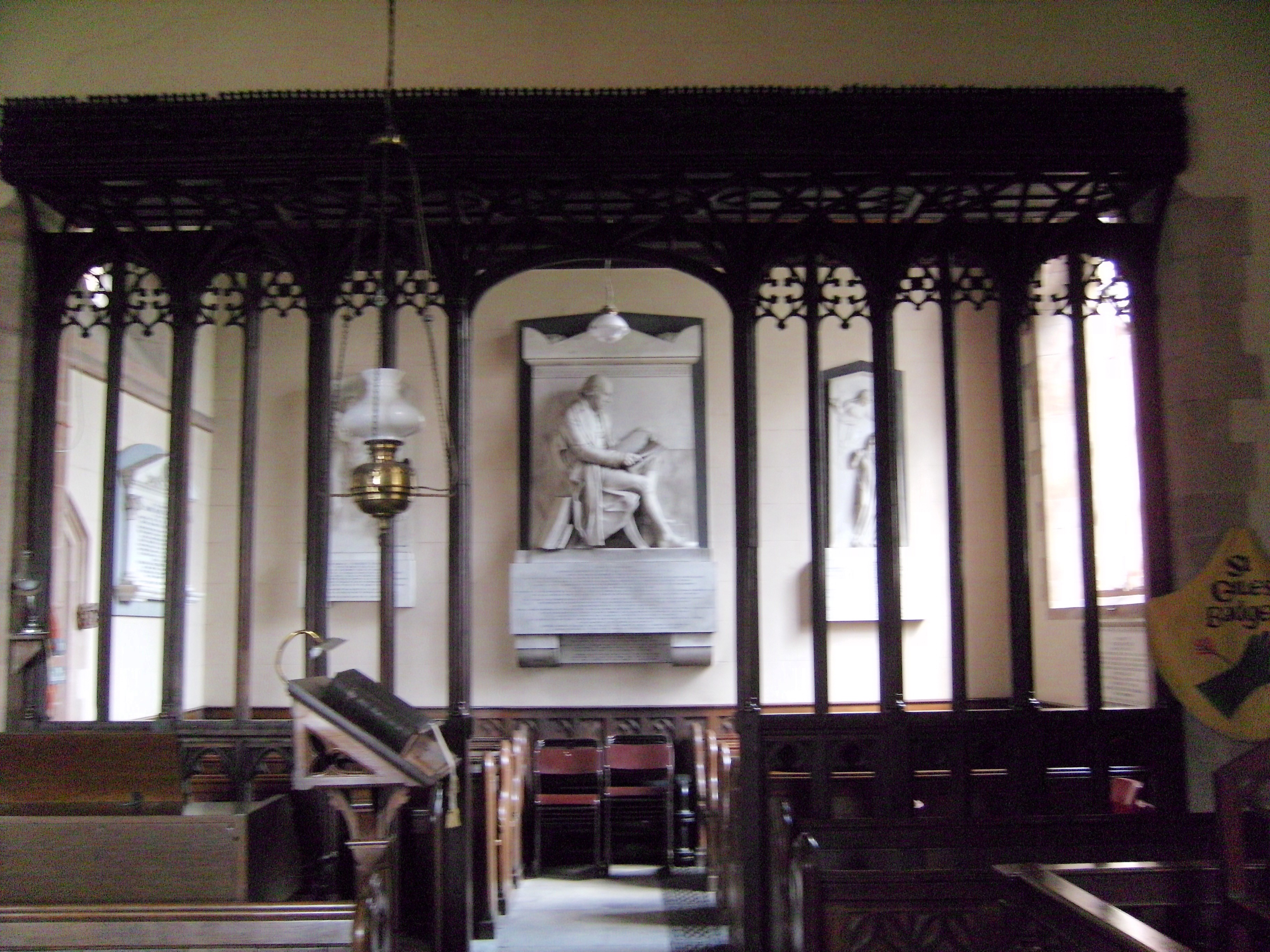
The north chapel, dominated by the Browne memorial, but built for Alfred Capel Cure. The screen dates from the 15th century, and was moved and cut to fit its present location.

=== Decline and recovery ===
After the death of Browne's wife in 1839, the estate passed to Robert Henry Cheney, his nephew. Cheney was a watercolourist, specialising in architectural and landscape subjects, and he became a noted pioneer photographer. He opened the Dingle to visitors for the first time and groups of working people began to travel out from the industrial towns to walk in it. He died childless in 1866 and left the estate to his brother Edward.

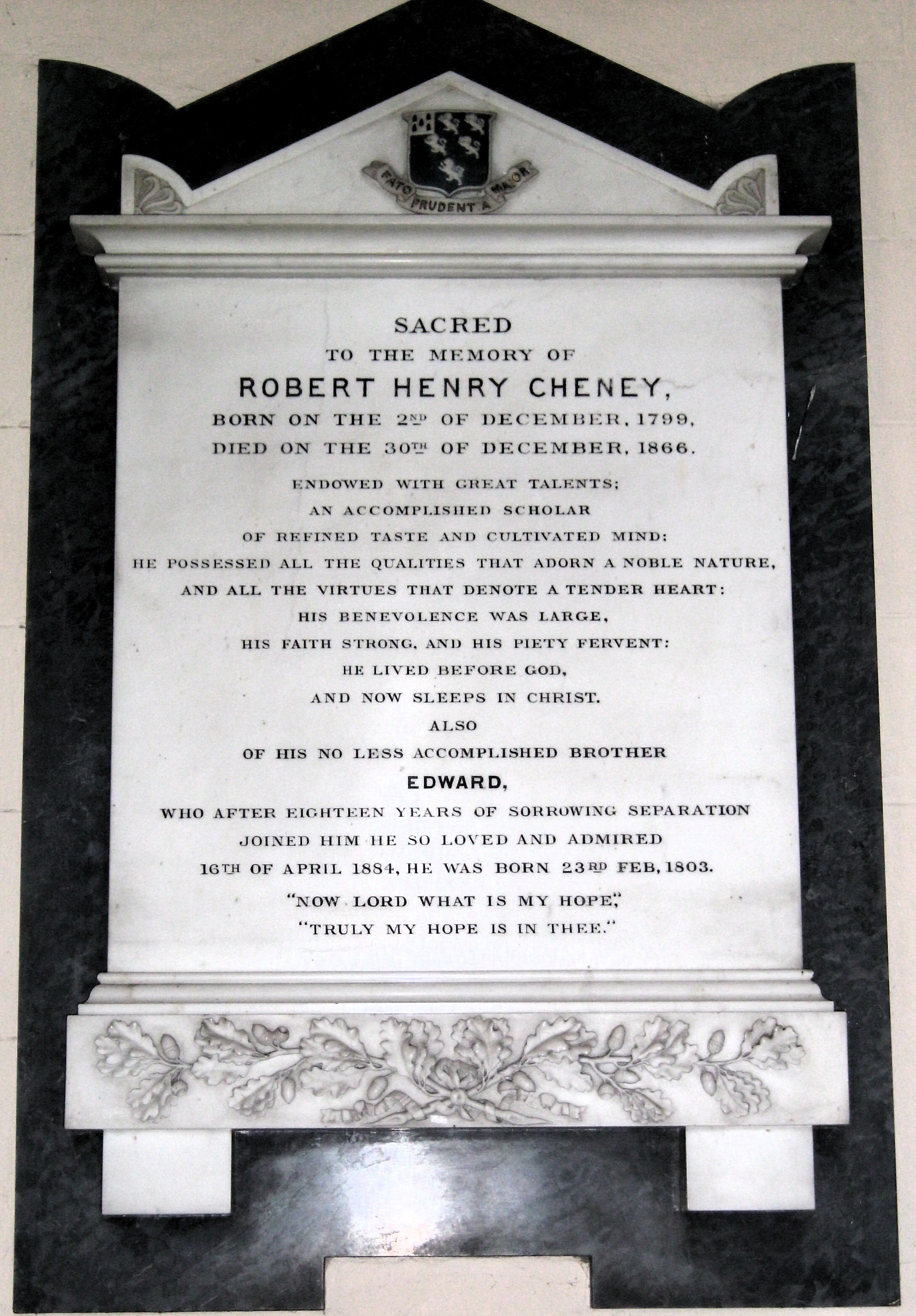
Memorial to the Cheney brothers, successive lords of the manor, on the south wall of the chancel of the parish church.

Occupations of adult males, 1831.

Population graph, 1801–1961

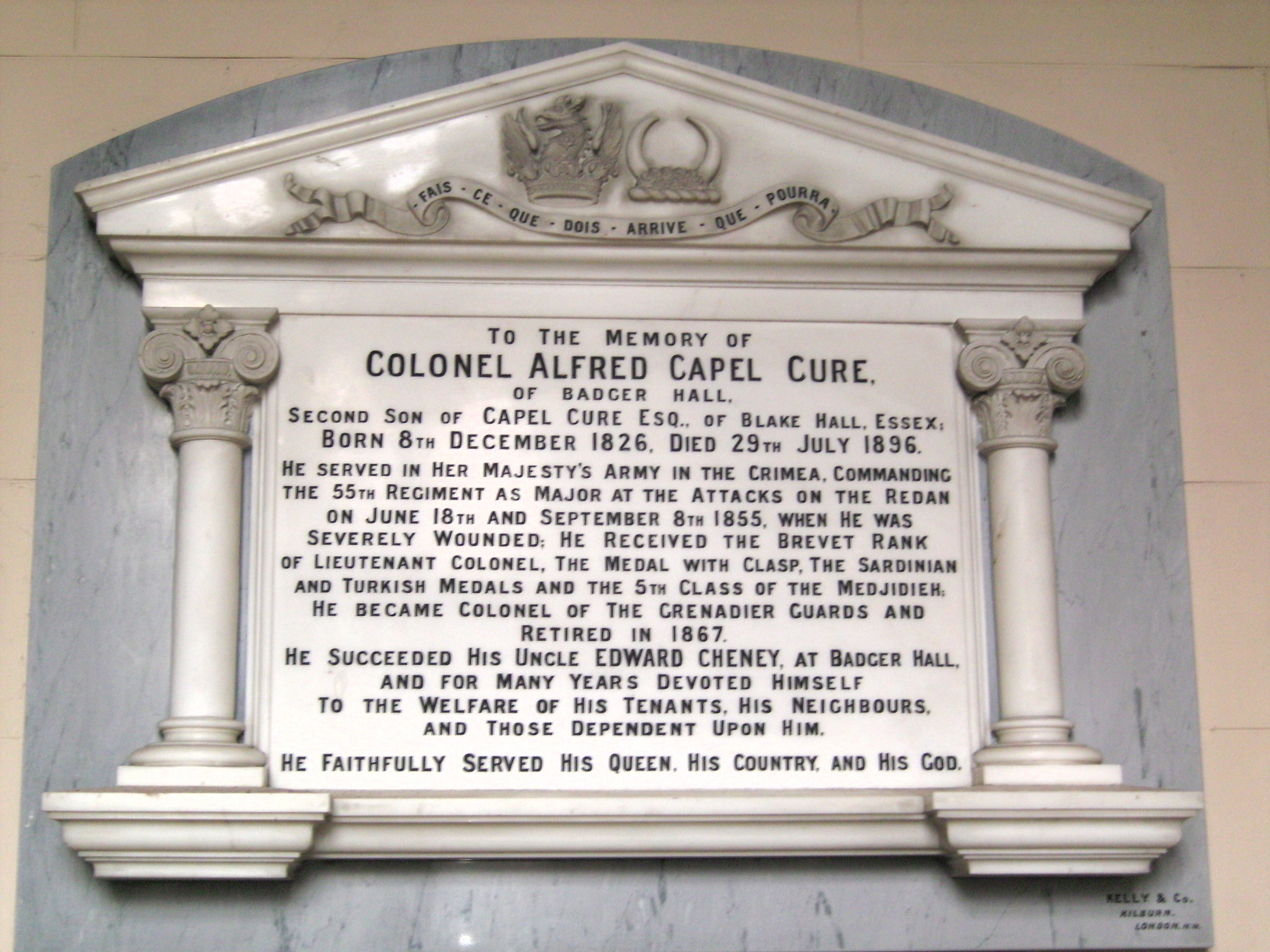
Memorial to Alfred Capel Cure, on the wall of the chapel he had built in the parish church.

When Edward died in 1884, Badger became the property of their nephew, Alfred Capel Cure of Blake Hall, Ongar, perhaps the most colourful of Badger's lords. Capel Cure was a hero of the Crimean War, wounded at the assault on the Redan in 1855. He had been introduced to photography by his uncle and pursued it enthusiastically, also specialising in architectural subjects. His work as a pioneer photographer is significant enough to have justified exhibitions in MoMA, New York and elsewhere although it goes un-noted on his memorial. He had a private family chapel added to the north side of the church. After holding Badger for 12 years, he was killed while trying to dynamite tree stumps on one of his other estates. The estate remained in the Capel Cure family until after World War II.

The population of Badger grew throughout the first half of the 19th century. From 88 in 1801, it reached 123 in 1811, 132 in 1821, and 142 in 1831. The census of 1831 provided the first and only summary how the men of the parish were employed. Of the 37 adult males, 25 or more than two-thirds, were agricultural labourers and four were farmers. The remainder consisted of four in retail of handicrafts, one professional (perhaps the rector), a couple of servants and one other. So agriculture accounted directly for the great majority of the working men, and almost everyone depended on it at least indirectly.

The population rose steadily to a peak of 178 in 1861. After that, like most agricultural villages in the region, it suffered a prolonged decline. By 1901 it was down to 140, and in 1951 it stood at precisely its 1801 level of 88. The cause is not hard to explain. Agriculture, the only significant employer in the parish, required less and less labour. The Long Depression hit the countryside around 1874, forcing farmers to reduce their output or sell at a loss. Thereafter, even relatively good times did nothing to raise employment, as farm amalgamations, improved crops and techniques, and mechanisation reduced the need for labour.

With the decline in population, a number of important village institutions found the going difficult. At the school Emma Grainger was mistress from 1891. She and Francis Capel Cure, the school's patron, died 1933. The school closed and thereafter, village children went to school in Beckbury or Worfield.

In 1952, the long-serving Rev. Archibald Dix retired and the parish was effectively amalgamated with Beckbury. Later amalgamations made it part of a benefice of six parishes. Archibald Dix died about a year after his retirement. His daughter, Margaret Dix MD FRCS, bought the rectory and lived in it until her death in 1992. She was distinguished surgeon at the National Hospital for Neurology and Neurosurgery, and is one of the eponyms of the Dix–Hallpike test for a benign paroxysmal positional vertigo. She bequeathed the house for Christian purposes within the diocese. After considerable debate, it was taken on by the Cornelius Trust, an evangelical military charity, and run as a holiday home, until being sold for a private residence in 2005.

At about the same time as the ecclesiastical parish was amalgamated, the much decayed Hall and estate were sold to John Swire and Sons, a huge property, finance shipping and airline conglomerate, in whose hands it remains. Sir Adrian Swire is lord of the manor. Much of the Hall was demolished in 1953. A utility building and gatehouse was re-christened Badger Hall and survives to this day: even this is sufficiently grand to give the impression to visitors that the original Hall still exists.

However, the 1950s marked a turning point. With the increasing availability of motor cars, villages like Badger have become much more attractive places to live. The number of houses in the parish had been falling slowly, with the decline in population. Now new houses were built and the post-War village has approximately doubled in size. Obviously, this has meant a considerable change in character from a working village to a mainly residential community. Despite the growth and changes in its role, the village retains a good deal of its old and picturesque appearance, which makes it a visitor attraction still.

== Geography ==
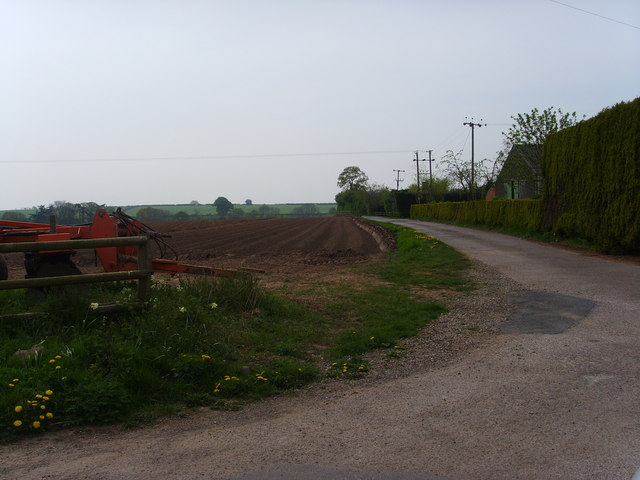
Badger Heath Farm, on the eastern edge of the parish, with typical sandy soil.

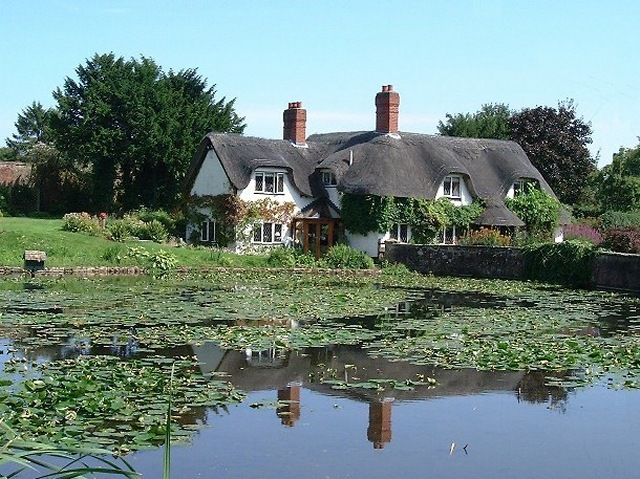
The Town Pool at Badger.

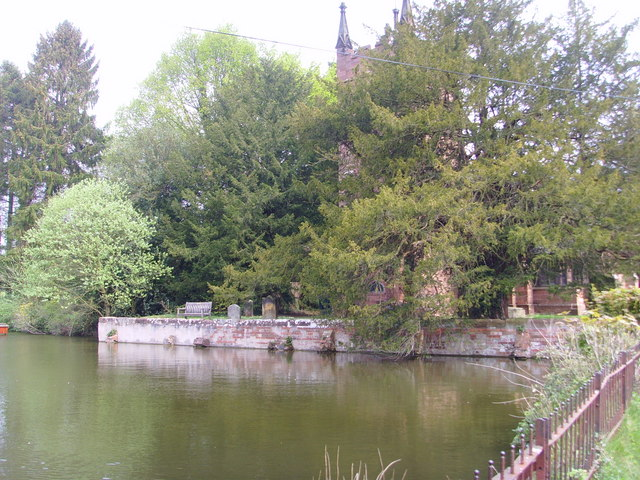
Pool in front of St. Giles' church. The pools go back centuries but were enlarged and reshaped in the Georgian period.

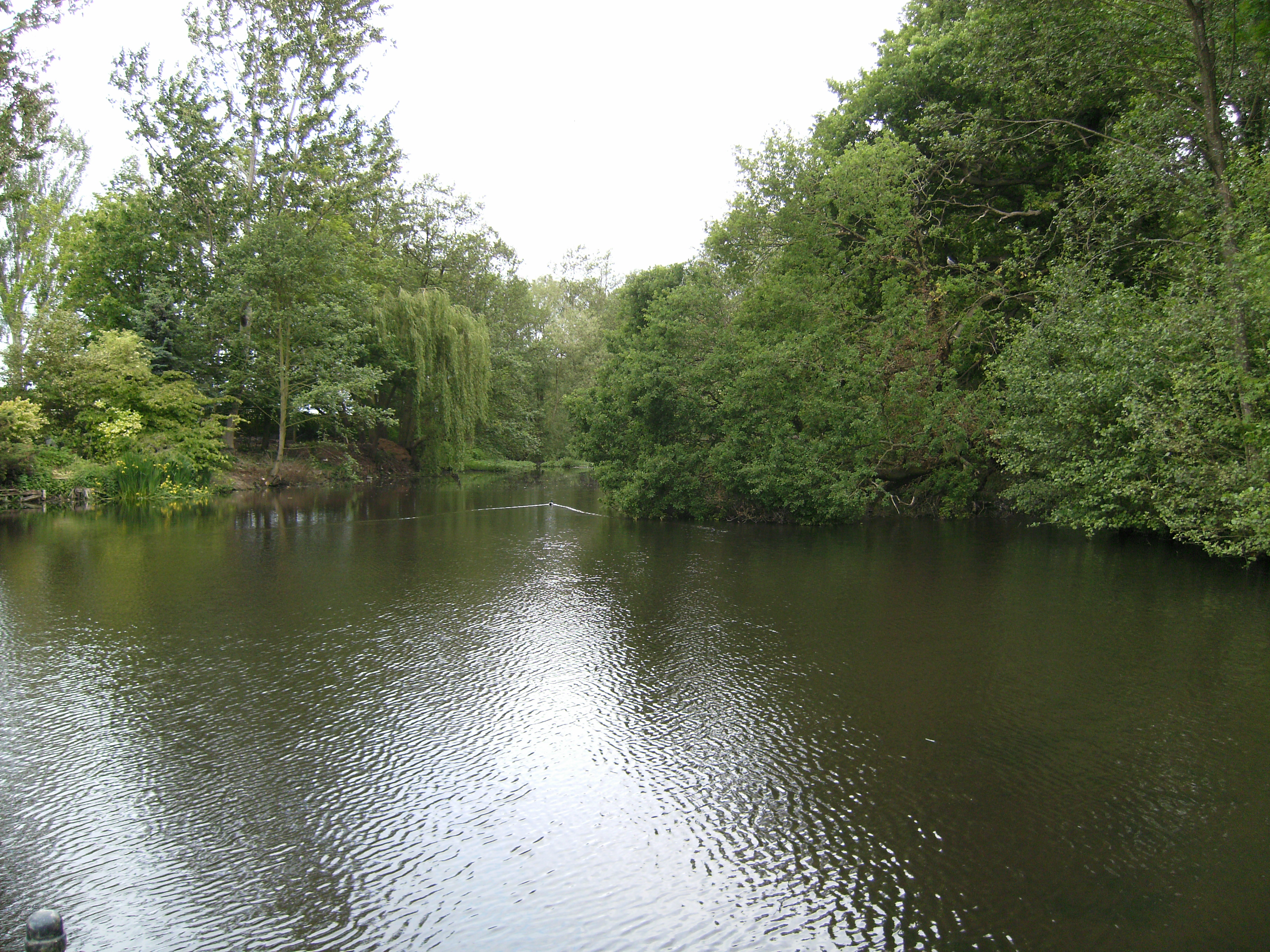
Mill pond on the upper Snowdon Brook, at the eastern edge of the parish.

=== Location and boundaries ===
The village of Badger is located in the angle created by the confluence of the River Worfe, also known as the Cosford Brook, and one of its tributaries, known as the Batch, the Heath or the Snowdon Brook. The Snowdon Brook approximately defines the eastern and southern borders of the parish, and the western boundary runs close to the River Worfe: presumably the streams were the exact boundaries before deliberate diversion, as well as natural shift, moved their courses slightly. The Worfe and the Snowdon drain part of the much larger River Severn catchment: the Worfe flows south and then west to join the Severn from its left, just above Bridgnorth.

The village is at about 65m above sea level, but the spur to the west, which probably gives the village its name, rises to about 95m. It is about halfway along the southern edge of the parish, which is about 2.5 km east to west, and 2 km north to south, an area of 374 hectares or 924 acres.

=== Geology ===
The village and the area to its north stand on Upper Mottled Sandstone, a Triassic deposit found in many parts of the West Midlands. This has been used extensively for building in the village, including St. Giles church. It is very evident in the Dingle, along the Snowdon Brook, where there are outcrops, cliffs and caves, artfully exposed and enhanced in the 18th century landscaping of the valley. The eastern side of the parish lies on boulder clay, sand and gravel, or till, glacial deposits from the ice ages.

=== Communications ===
The village has always relied on road communications. Historically, the most important road ran south from Beckbury and turned sharply at Badger to run east to Pattingham. This has now been reshaped so that the priority lies with traffic turning south to Stableford, where the minor road joins a B-road connecting Telford with the Black Country. The First Series of the Ordnance Survey shows that until Victorian times a road also used to run across the Dingle directly to Ackleton, but this has dwindled into a footpath.

== Government ==
The parish of Badger is part of the unitary authority of Shropshire Council. This was formed by the merger of several existing district councils with Shropshire County Council.

Before the merger, Badger was part of Bridgnorth District from 1974 to 2009, in a two-tier system with the County Council as the top tier. Previously it had been part of Shifnal Rural District since 1894.

There is also a parish council. This has a long history and originated in the old parish vestry, although civil and ecclesiastical functions were separated in the Victorian period. Today it has five elected members.

== Features ==
Interesting or attractive features around the village today include:

=== The village pools ===
There are actually four pools in the village, but two are particularly prominent to the visitor: the Church Pool and the Town Pool. The pools are the result of damming a small stream running down to the Snowdon Brook in the Dingle. They reached approximately their present state in the late 18th century, as a result of the landscaping commissioned by Isaac Hawkins Browne and devised by William Emes, but they had been a central feature of the village for centuries before, as evinced by Francis Kynnersley's threat to throw the rector into the pond in 1614. 52.5935°N 2.3441°W

=== St. Giles' parish church ===
The parish church is a small but good example of Gothic Revival architecture. Rebuilt from 1833, using the original site and materials as far as possible, it contains a notable selection of funerary art, including work by Francis Leggatt Chantrey, John Flaxman and John Gibson. Location: 52.5938°N 2.3437°W.

Funerary art in St. Giles church

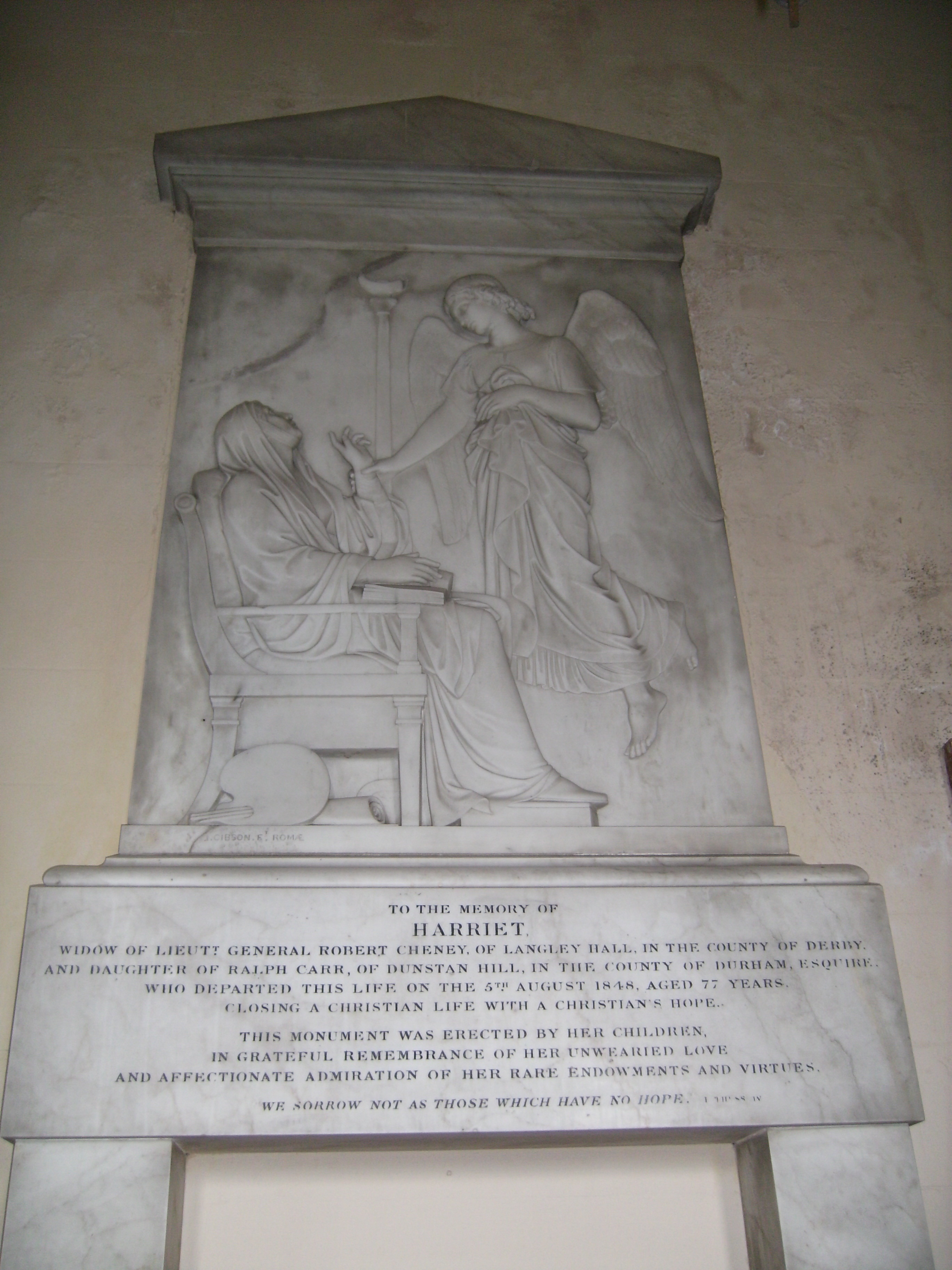
Memorial to Harriet Cheney, by John Gibson. Harriet was the mother of R.H. Cheney, to whom Browne left the manor.

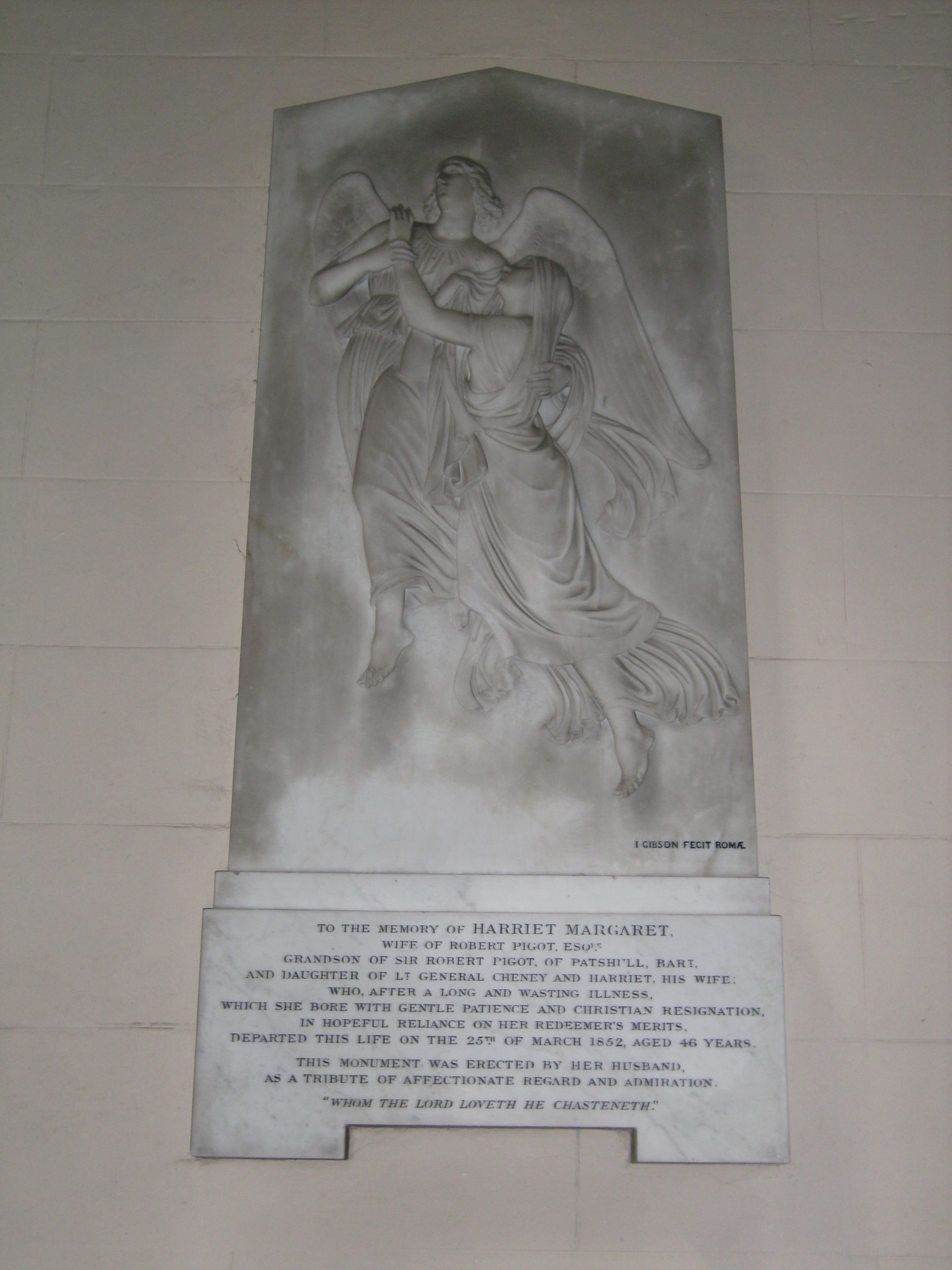
Memorial to Harriet Margaret Pigot, née Cheney, by John Gibson. She was R.H. Cheney's sister, and married Robert Pigot. The Pigots, a military and political dynasty, had their seat at Patshull Hall, east of Badger.

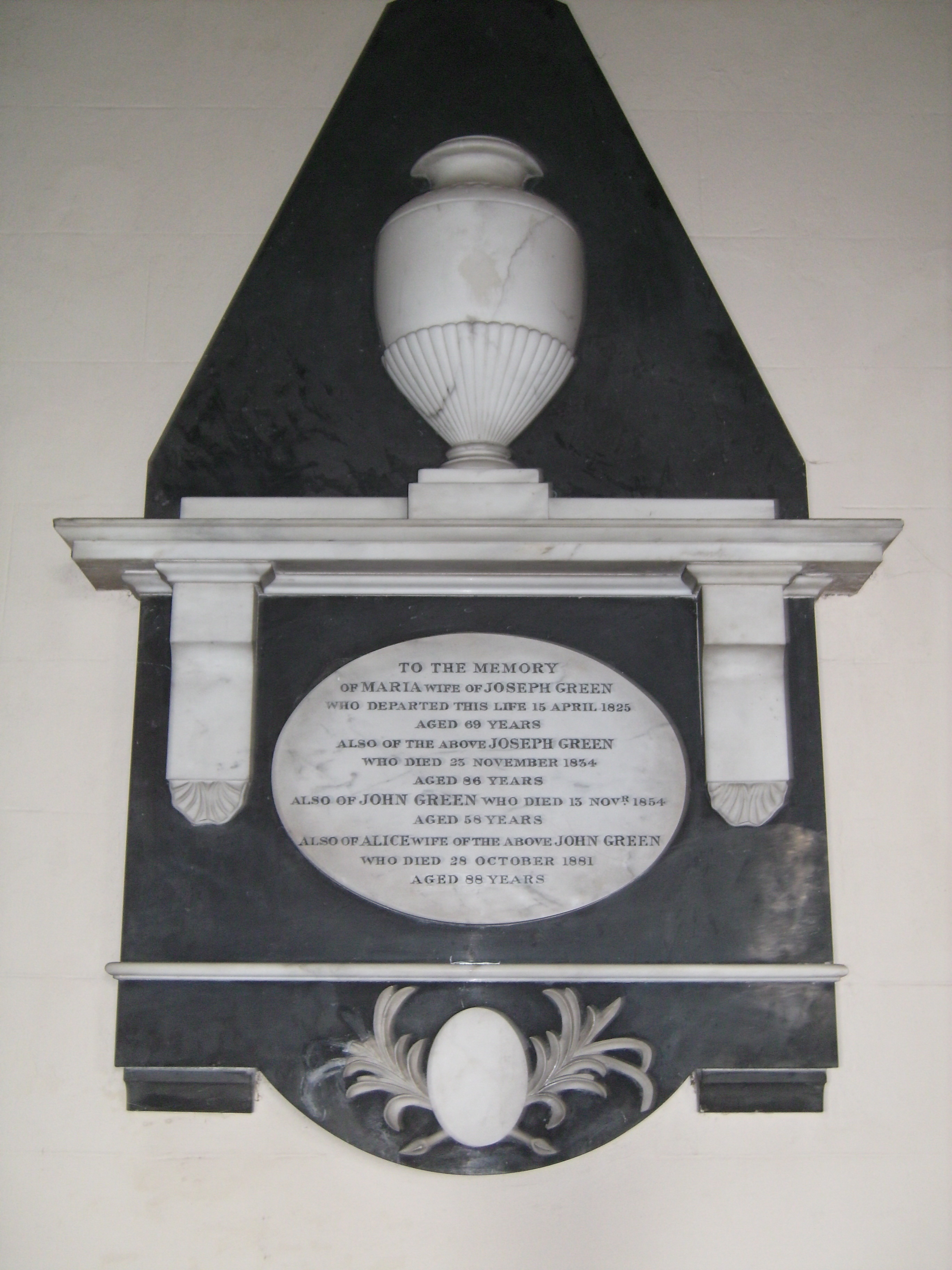
Memorial to the Greens of Badger Heath. They contributed a considerable £100 to the rebuilding of the church in 1833–34.

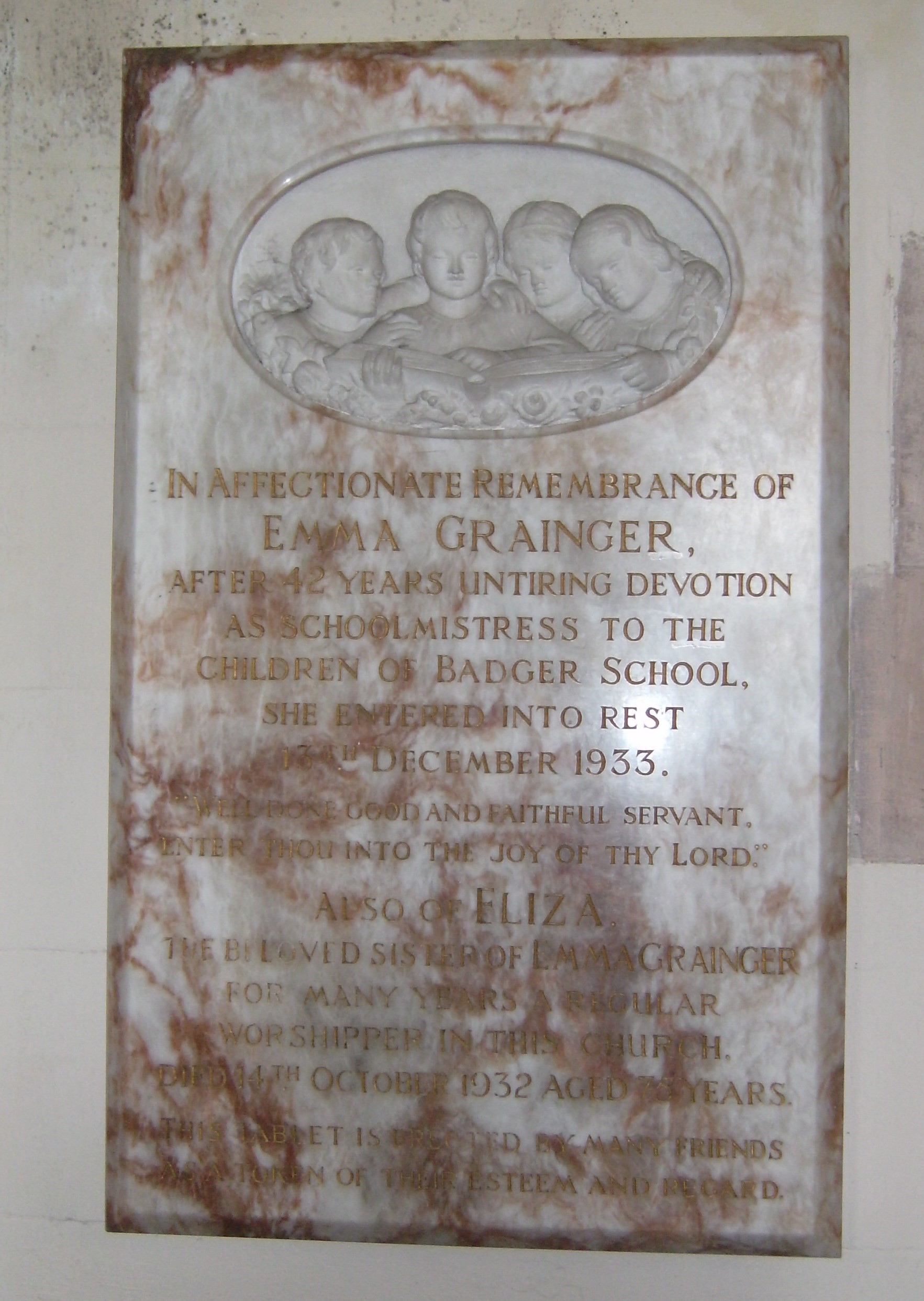
Memorial to the long-serving teacher, Emma Grainger, whose death signalled the end of the school.

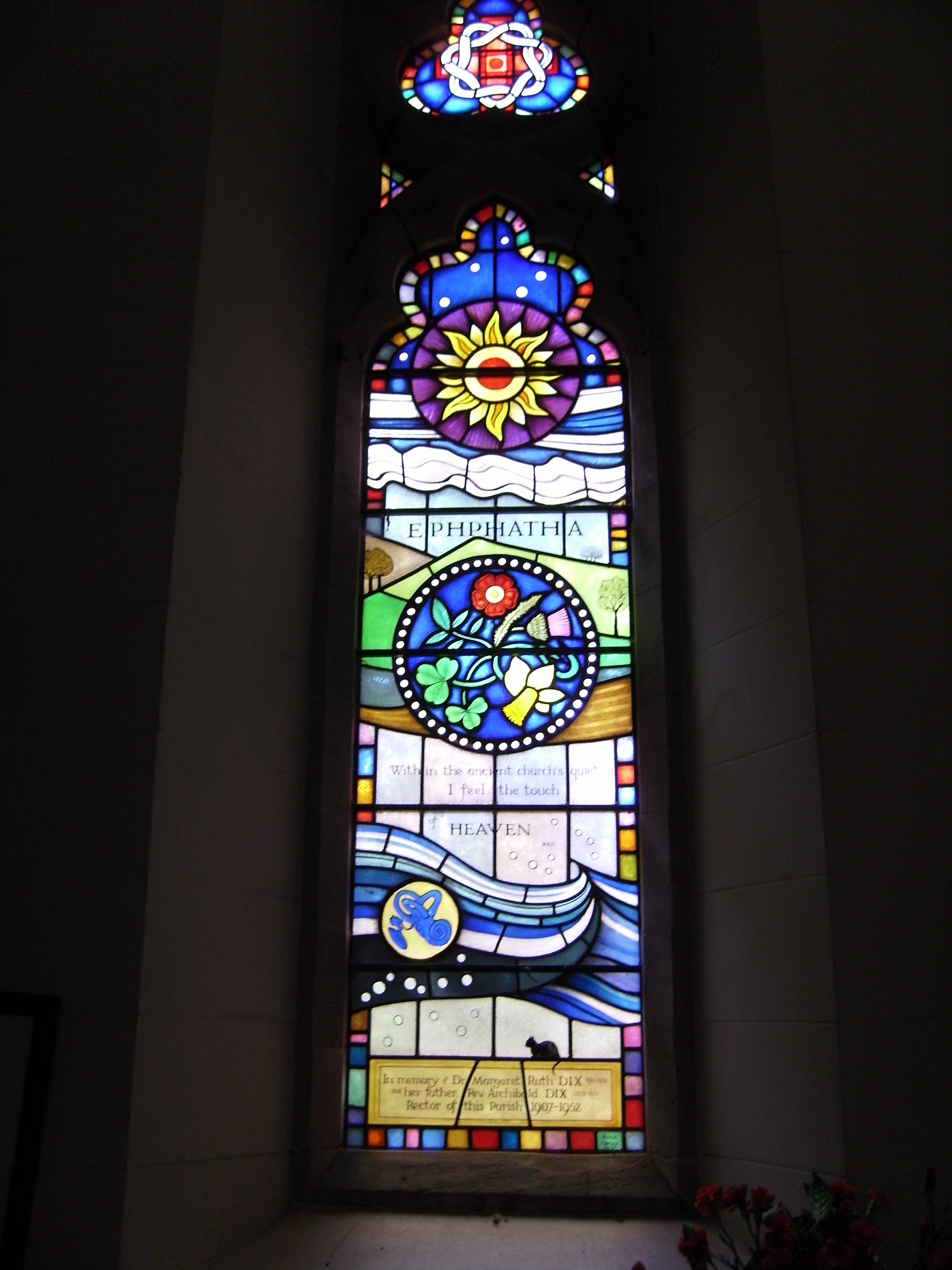
The Dix Window. Margaret Dix, daughter of the last rector, was a neuro-otologist. The Aramaic word ephphatha is that attributed to Jesus when healing a deaf and dumb man.

=== Badger Dingle ===
Badger Dingle is listed Grade II in Historic England's Register of Parks and Gardens. A notable example of picturesque landscape architecture, this narrow valley to the south of the village was opened to the public in 1851. Although it has undergone periods of decay, it is now fairly accessible, with paths easily passable in dry weather and a new bridge above the Upper Pool making circular walks feasible. The best entrances are opposite the village cemetery. Badger Dingle is believed to be the original for "Badgwick Dingle" mentioned in the Blandings novels of P.G. Wodehouse, whose family during his youth lived at nearby Stableford in Worfield parish. Location: 52.5921°N 2.3457°W.

Badger Dingle

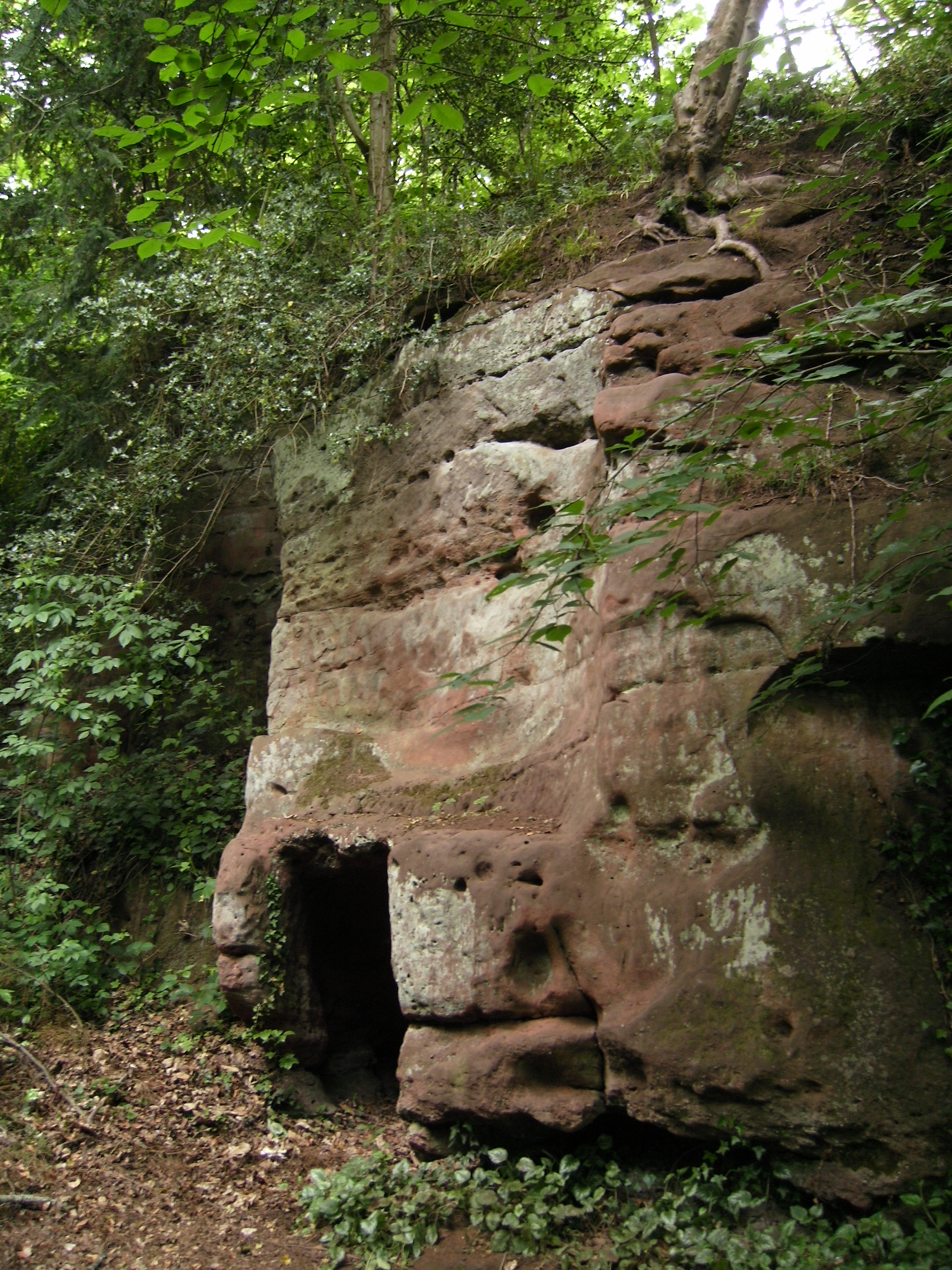
Sandstone outcrop with small caves, near the eastern end of the Upper Pool.

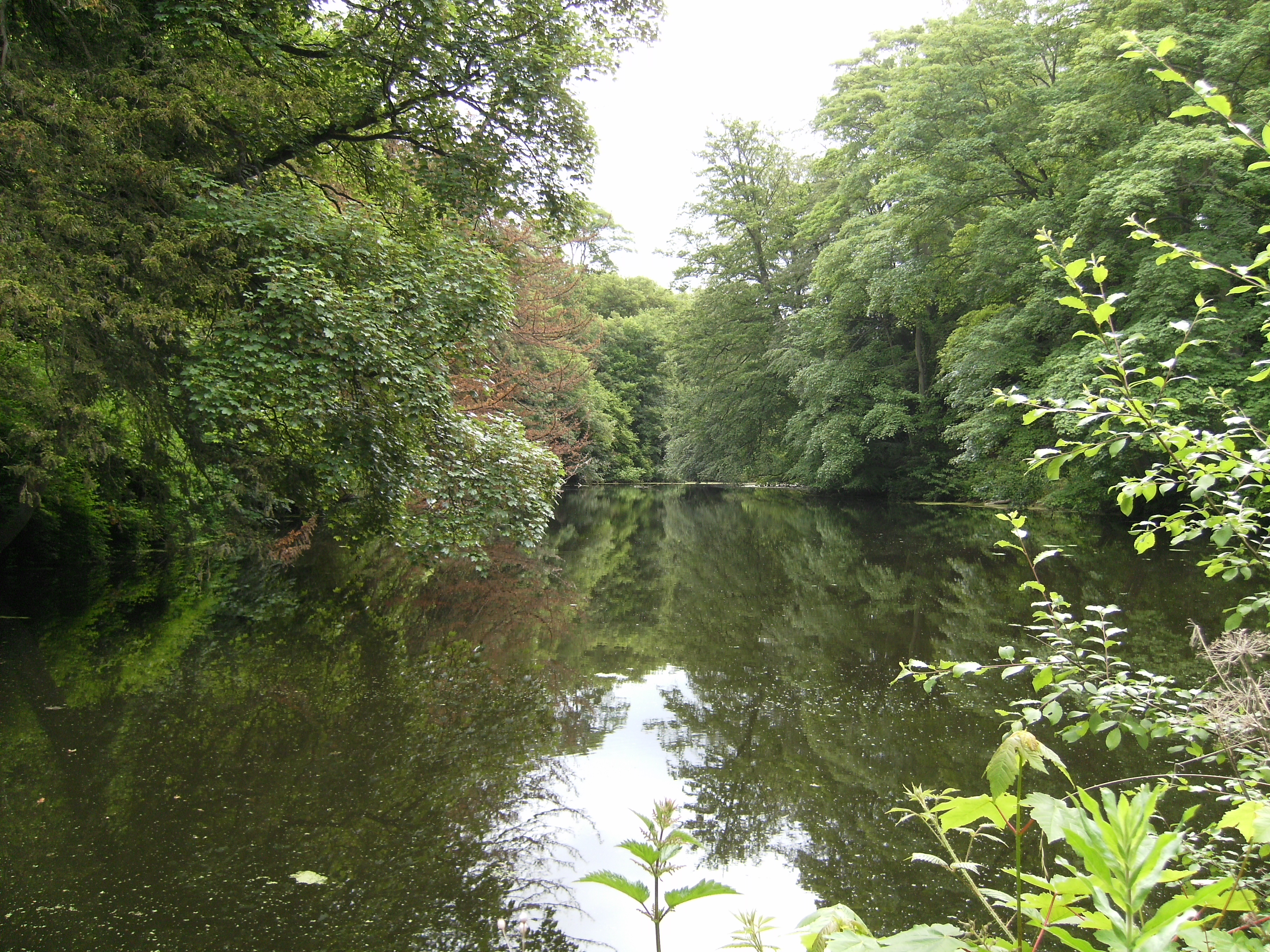
View of the Upper Pool from its western end.

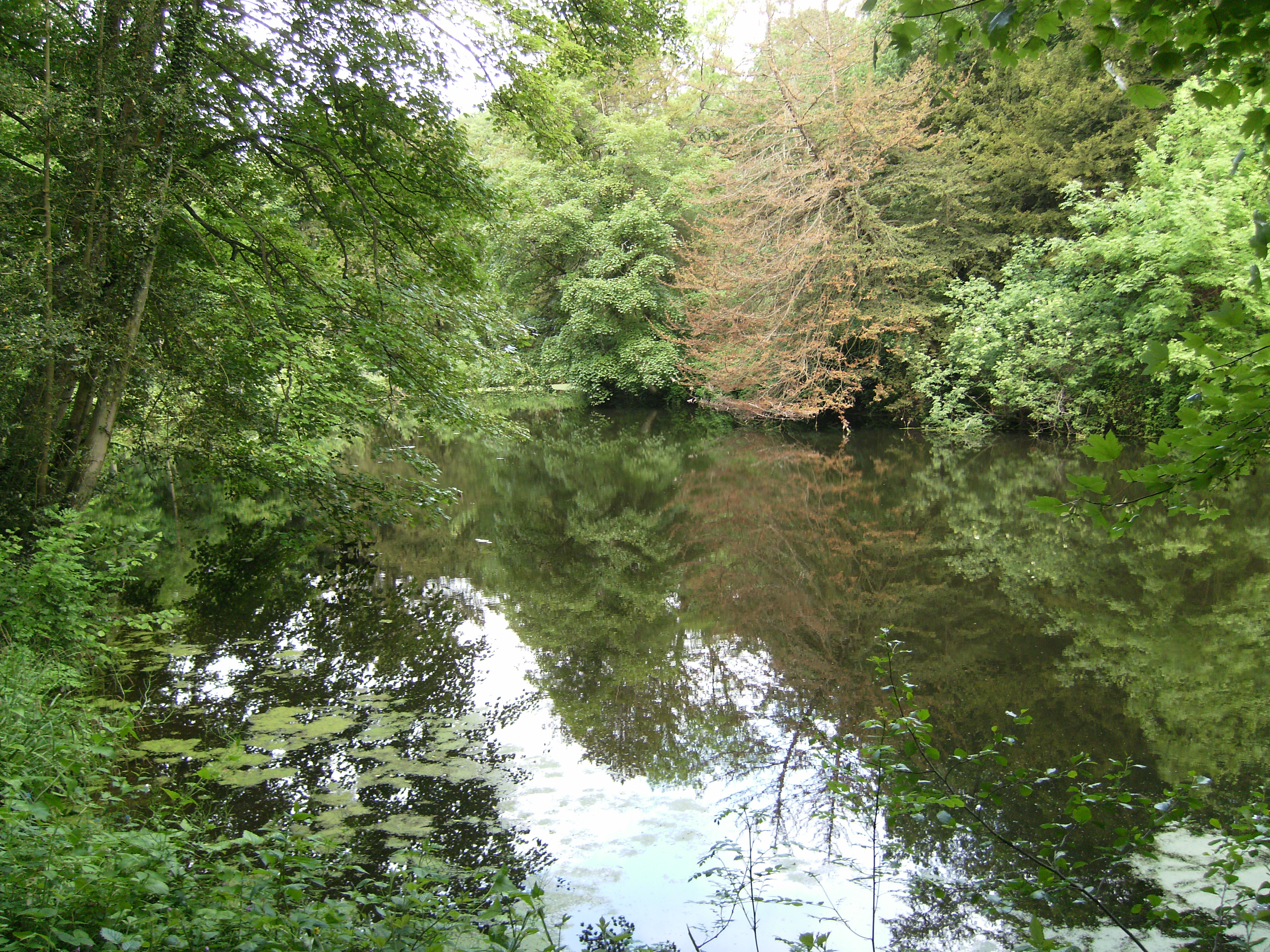
Reflections of trees in the Upper pool, seen from the southern side.

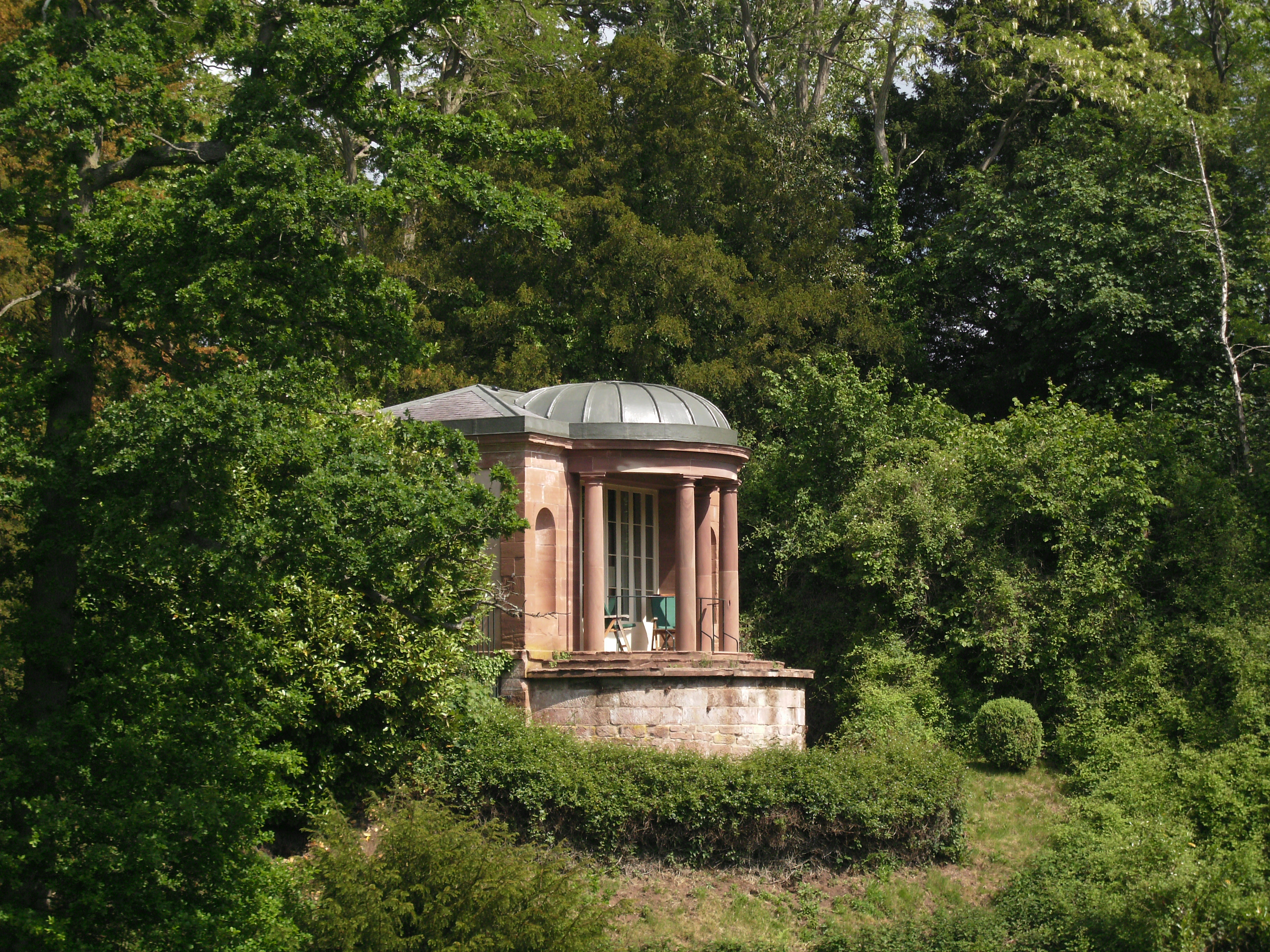
Reconstruction of the Doric Temple, originally commissioned by Isaac Browne, on the north side of the Dingle.

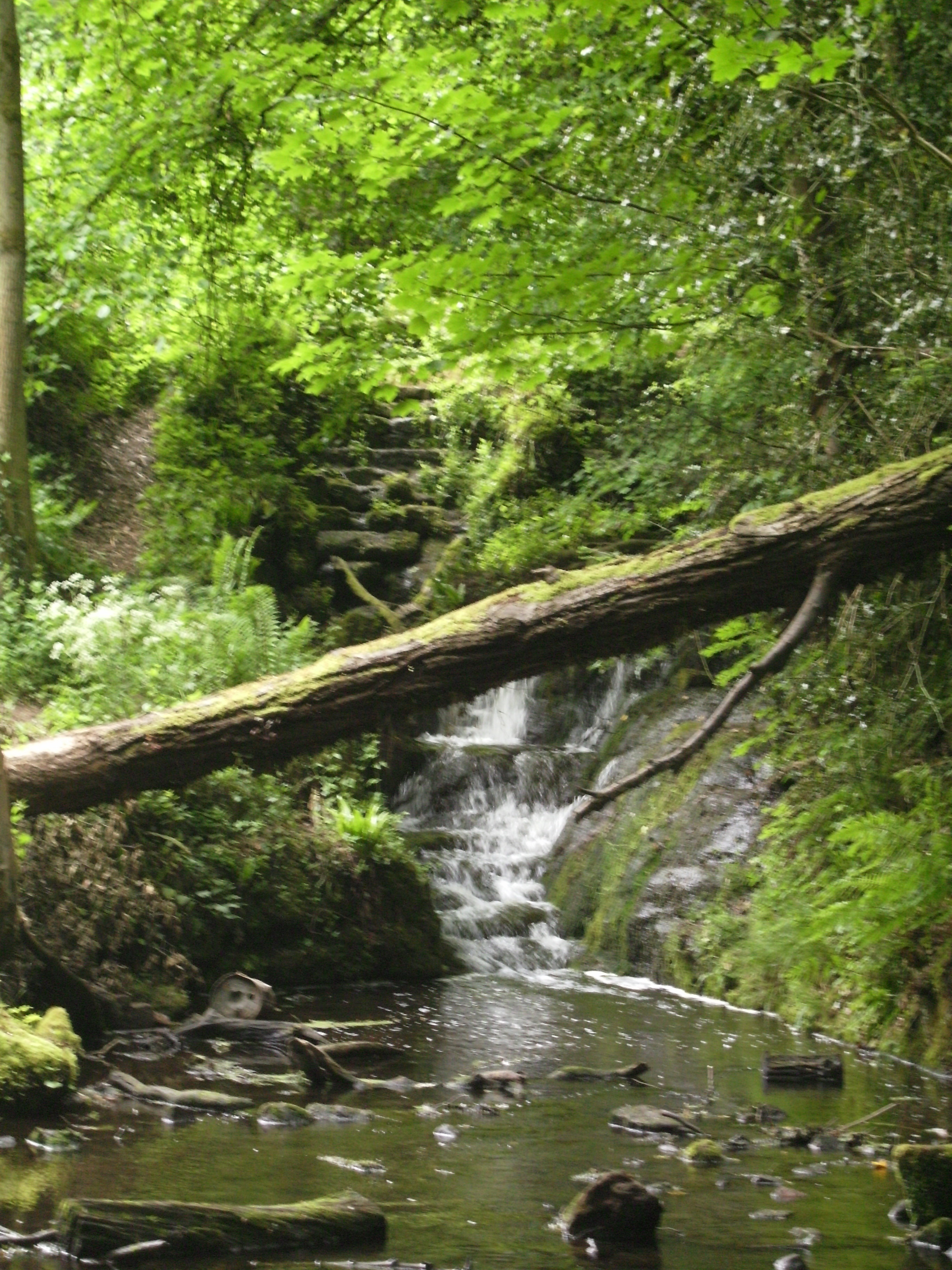
Cascades at the western end of the Upper Pool.

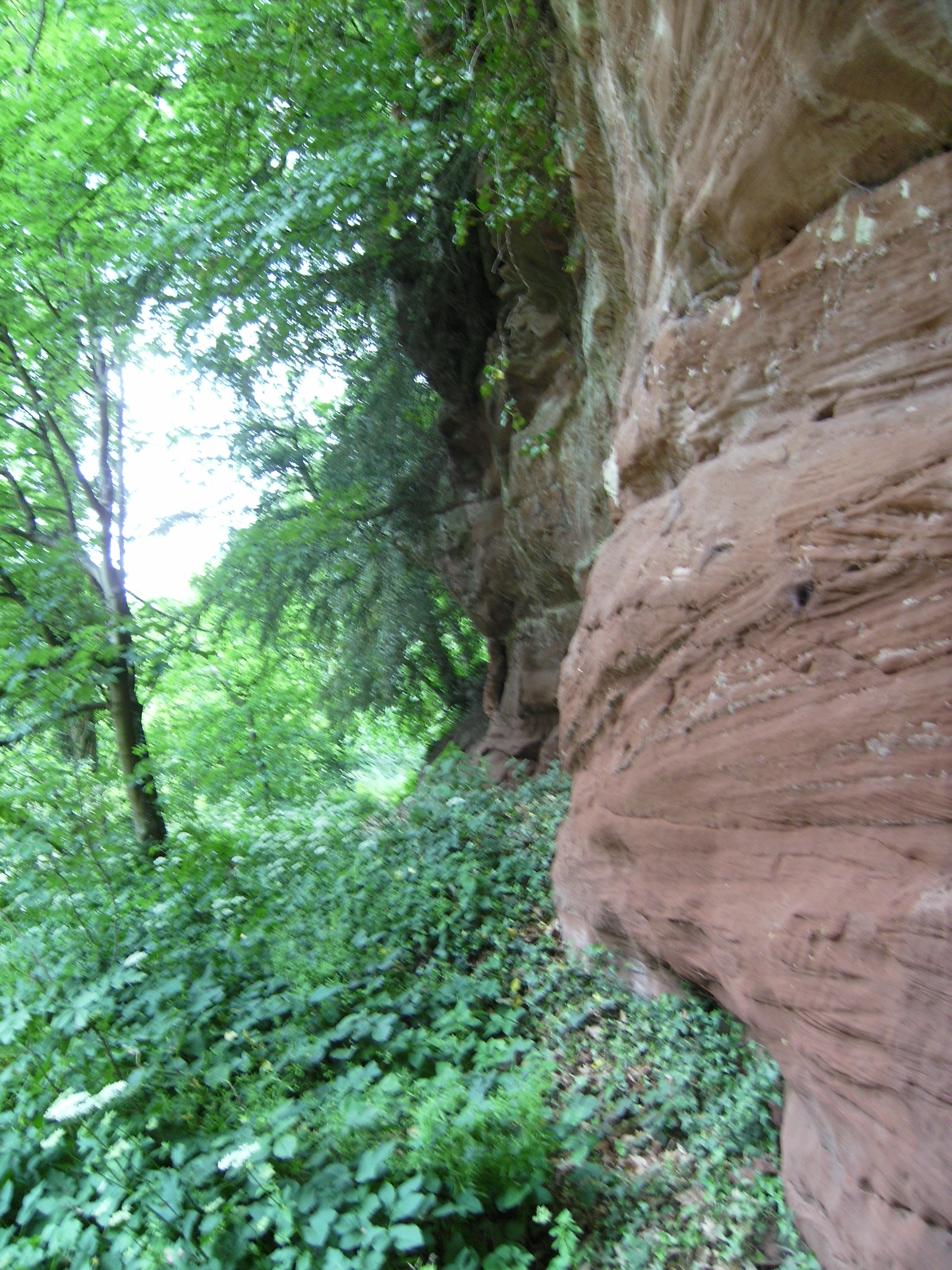
Weathered sandstone cliff on the north side of the Dingle.

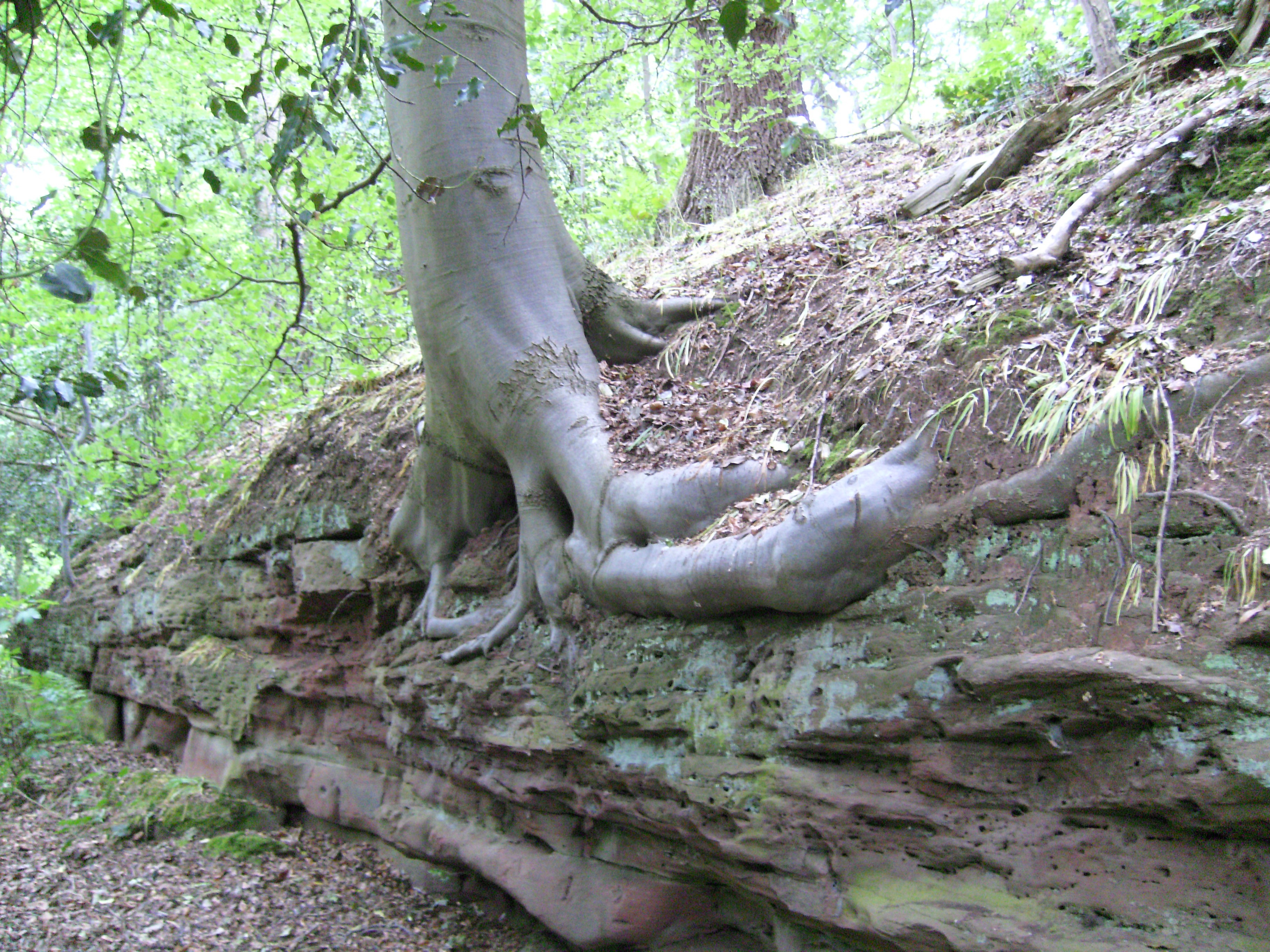
Ash tree rooted in a sandstone outcrop on the northern lip of the Dingle.

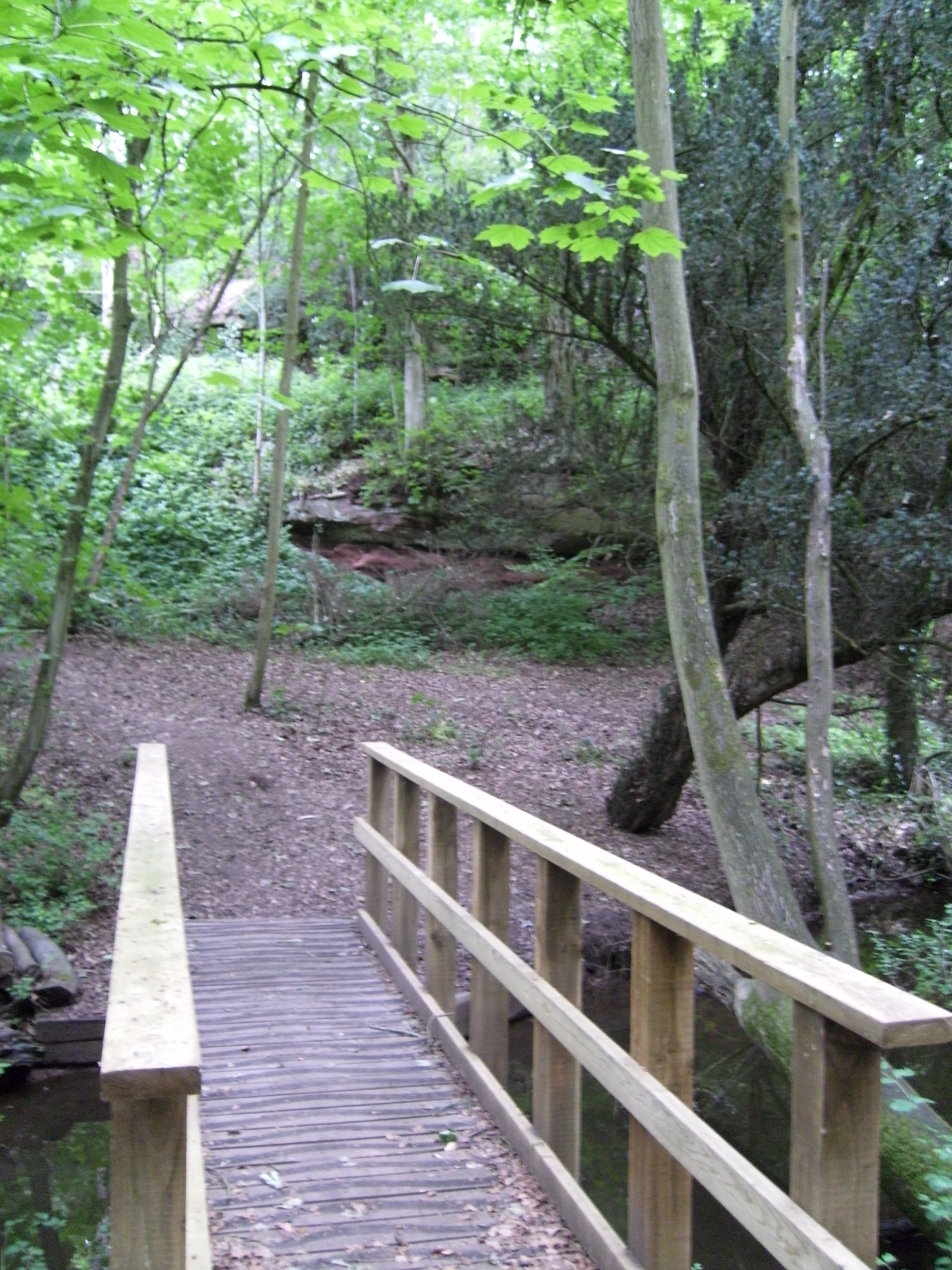
Wooden bridge over the Snowdon Brook.

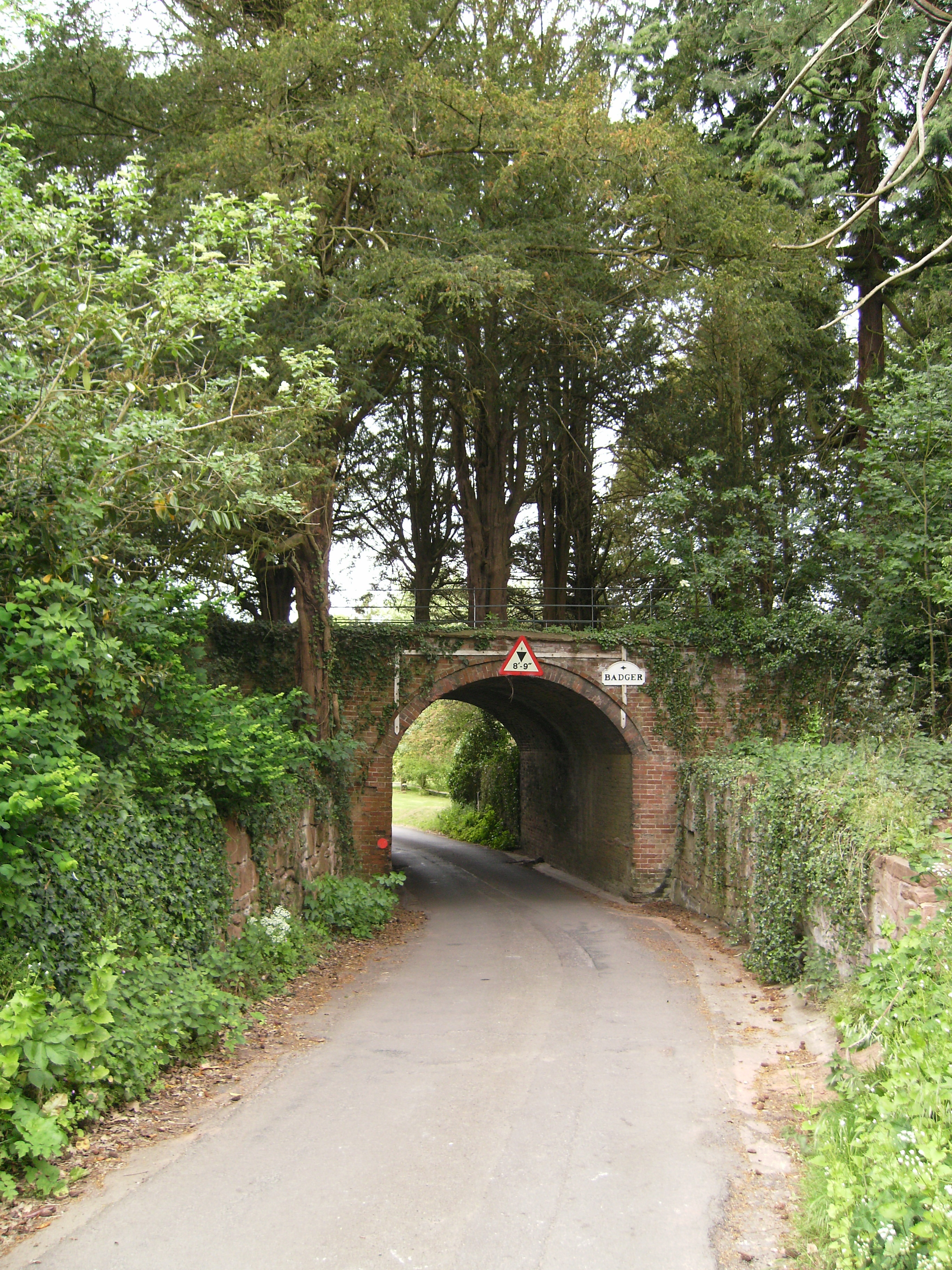
Bridge providing private access to the Dingle over the Pattingham road.

== See also ==
- List of civil parishes in Shropshire
- Listed buildings in Badger, Shropshire
