= Listed buildings in Badger, Shropshire =

Badger is a civil parish in Shropshire, England. It contains eleven listed buildings that are recorded in the National Heritage List for England. Of these, one is listed at Grade II*, the middle of the three grades, and the others are at Grade II, the lowest grade. The parish contains the village of Badger and the surrounding countryside. The listed buildings include houses and cottages, a church and a churchyard cross, two summer houses in the form of a Classical temples, and two bridges.

== Key ==
Grade	Criteria
II*	Particularly important buildings of more than special interest
II	Buildings of national importance and special interest

== Buildings ==
Name and location	Photograph	Date	Notes	Grade
Churchyard cross 52.59382°N 2.34351°W		14th or 15th century (probable)	The cross is in the churchyard of St Giles' Church. It is in sandstone, and consists of a square socket stone with chamfered corners. The shaft is about 4 metres (13 ft) high and is split down the middle.	II*
Nos. 3 and 4 Badger; 52.59252°N 2.34446°W		17th century (probable)	A pair of cottages in red brick and sandstone with some timber framing and a thatched roof. They have one storey with attics, and a front of six bays. The windows are 20th-century casements, and in the attics are eyebrow eaves dormers.	II
Hunter's Bridge; 52.59235°N 2.34082°W	—	17th century	A timber framed house with brick infill on a brick plinth with a tile roof, it was extended in brick in the 19th century. There is one storey with attics, and it contains 20th-century casement windows and 20th-century gabled dormers.	II
The Old Hall; 52.59454°N 2.34358°W		c. 1700	Originally the service wing of Badger Hall, now demolished, and later a private house, it is in red brick on a sandstone plinth, with a band and a stone eaves cornice, and a hipped tile roof. There are two storeys with attics, and a garden front of seven bays. On the front is an arched recess containing a doorway, and at the rear are sash windows and a Doric colonnade. Behind the house are 19th-century single-storey ranges with slate roofs forming a courtyard.	II
Old Coach House; 52.59219°N 2.34124°W	—	18th century (probable)	At one time a cart shed with a granary above, the building is partly timber framed with red brick infill, and partly in sandstone, with a tiled roof. There are two storeys, external steps on the left gable end, and 19th-century brick extensions at both ends. (Note: Street View in March 2009 shows that the building has been converted for domestic use.)	II
Stableford Bridge; 52.58632°N 2.35589°W		18th century	The bridge carries a road over the River Worfe. It is in sandstone, and consists of a single segmental arch. The bridge has a flat string course, and plain parapets with moulded coping.	II
Classical Temple (east); 52.59156°N 2.33886°W		Late 18th century (probable)	A summer house in the form of a Classical temple in Badger Dingle, converted in 1995–96 into a holiday cottage. It is in stuccoed brick with sandstone dressings and a moulded eaves cornice. There is a square plan with two apses, one storey and a basement below ground level containing vaulted cellars. On the front is a portico with four Tuscan columns, behind these are sound-arched openings, and flanking them are round-headed niches. On the roof is a semi-dome.	II
Classical Temple (west); 52.59046°N 2.34903°W		Late 18th century (probable)	A summer house in the form of a Classical temple in Badger Dingle. It is in sandstone and stuccoed brick with a cement roof. The building is circular with a colonnade of four Tuscan columns, with a frieze, a moulded entablature, and a ribbed dome. Inside is a stone bench.	II
Bridge and quadrant walls 52.59277°N 2.34006°W		Late 18th or early 19th century	The bridge carries a private road over a public road. It is in red brick with a stone parapet, and has a single span arch about 3 metres (9.8 ft) high. The quadrant walls form a revetment for the bank of the private road.	II
St Giles' Church; 52.59385°N 2.34368°W		1833–34	Some medieval masonry is incorporated into the base of the tower. The north chapel and porch were added in 1886 when other alterations were made. The church is built in sandstone with a slate roof, and consists of a nave and chancel in one unit, a south porch, a north chapel, a vestry, and a west tower. The tower has buttresses, a clock face on the south side, an embattled parapet with pinnacles, and a weathervane.	II
Nos. 6–8 Badger; 52.59203°N 2.34320°W	—	1844	A house, later divided into three, in sandstone with tiled roofs, and extensions to the right and rear in red brick. There are two storeys and three bays, with a projecting gable on the right. There is a gabled porch with a four-centred arch, and mullioned windows containing casements.	II

== Notes and references ==
=== Sources ===
- Historic England, "Churchyard Cross about 5 metres south-east of the chancel of the Church of St. Giles, Badger (1221769)", National Heritage List for England
- Historic England, "Nos. 3 and 4, Badger (1274941)", National Heritage List for England
- Historic England, "Hunter's Bridge, Badger (1221918)", National Heritage List for England
- Historic England, "The Old Hall, Badger (1367637)", National Heritage List for England
- Historic England, "Old Coach House, Badger (1367638)", National Heritage List for England
- Historic England, "Stableford Bridge, Badger (1222320)", National Heritage List for England
- Historic England, "Classical Temple at N.G.R. SO 7713 9934, Badger (1053667)", National Heritage List for England
- Historic England, "Classical Temple at N.G.R. SO 7625 9911, Badger (1053668)", National Heritage List for England
- Historic England, "Bridge and quadrant walls over road at N.G.R. SO 7705 9949, Badger (1222101)", National Heritage List for England
- Historic England, "Church of St. Giles, Badger (1053665)", National Heritage List for England
- Historic England, "Nos. 6–8, Badger (1053666)", National Heritage List for England
- Historic England, Listed Buildings
- Newman, John; Pevsner, Nikolaus (2006), Shropshire, The Buildings of England, New Haven and London: Yale University Press, ISBN 0-300-12083-4
