= Listed buildings in Beckbury =

Beckbury is a civil parish in Shropshire, England. It contains 17 listed buildings that are recorded in the National Heritage List for England. Of these, one is listed at Grade II*, the middle of the three grades, and the others are at Grade II, the lowest grade. The parish contains the village of Beckbury and the surrounding countryside. Most of the listed buildings are in the village and consist of houses and associated structures. Other listed buildings in the village are a church with items in the churchyard, a cock pit, a possible ice house, and a school. Outside the village, the listed buildings are a farm building, a country house, cottages, and a structure hewn in rock underground, described as a grotto.

== Key ==
Grade	Criteria
II*	Particularly important buildings of more than special interest
II	Buildings of national importance and special interest

== Buildings ==
Name and location	Photograph	Date	Notes	Grade
St Milburga's Church; 52.61130°N 2.34834°W		c. 1300	The oldest part of the church is the chancel, the nave and tower were built shortly after 1731, the south aisle in 1856, and the north transept and north aisle in 1879–80. The church was restored in 1884 and the porch added in 1888. The church is built in red sandstone, with some repairs on red brick, and it has a tile roof. It consists of a nave with a north clerestory, north and south aisles, a north porch, a north transept, a chancel, and a west tower. The tower has two stages with quoins, a doorway with alternating rustication, a moulded cornice, and a pyramidal roof with a weathervane.	II*
Beckbury Hall; 52.61136°N 2.34921°W	—	Late 16th century	Originally a timber framed manor house, later encased, altered, and extended. It is in red brick, with applied timber framing on the east front, and tile roofs. There are 2½ storeys, and a garden front of three gabled bays. The outer bays contain two-storey canted bay windows with ramped coping and ball finials. Over the entrance is a 20th-century verandah, and the windows are 19th-century casements.	II
The White House; 52.61134°N 2.35151°W		16th or 17th century	The house was remodelled in the 19th century. It is timber framed and encased in brick, and has a tile roof. There are two storeys and four bays. On the front is a gabled porch, and the windows are 19th-century casements.	II
Cheriton Cottage; 52.61176°N 2.35107°W		17th century	Two cottages, later combined into one house, remodelled and extended in the 19th century. The house is timber framed with brick cladding, there are some sandstone blocks at the right end, and it has a tile roof. There are two storeys, a central doorway with a gabled porch, and 19th-century casement windows.	II
Church Farmhouse; 52.61189°N 2.34849°W		17th century	The farmhouse was remodelled in the 19th century. It is stuccoed over timber framing and sandstone, and has a tile roof. There are two storeys with attics, and a front of three bays. On the front is a gabled porch and French windows. There are gabled dormers with finials in the attic, the other windows being casements. A brick barn at the rear has been incorporated into the house.	II
Laundry, Beckbury Hall; 52.61114°N 2.34923°W	—	18th century	The laundry is in red brick with a pyramidal tiled roof, a pyramidal lantern, and a pointed finial, and it contains casement windows. To the right is a 20th-century extension with a hipped roof.	II
Barn, Brook Farmhouse; 52.60962°N 2.36240°W	—	18th century	The barn is timber framed with brick infill on a red brick plinth, and with a tile roof. It has been extended to the northwest in brick. The barn has three bays, and contains wide entrances and air vents.	II
Barn and horse trough, High Street; 52.61131°N 2.34686°W		18th century	The barn is timber framed with brick infill on a sandstone plinth, with weatherboarding below the eaves, and a tile roof. There is a large entrance, and casement windows. In front of the barn is a cast iron horse trough dated 1854 with a bowed plan, that was placed in its present position in 1981.	II
Cock pit 52.61024°N 2.34869°W	—	18th or early 19th century	The cock pit is a circular enclosure of sandstone blocks three or four courses high. There are semicircular steps to the north and the south.	II
Grotto; 52.62333°N 2.33278°W		18th or early 19th century (probable)	A cave hewn out of the side of a former quarry, consisting of ambulatories and caverns. It contains columns and carved decoration, including some in Norman style.	II
Caynton Hall, The Small House and The Garden House; 52.62358°N 2.32959°W	—	1803	A country house, its service and stable blocks converted into separate dwellings. The hall is stuccoed and has a slate roof. There are two storeys and seven bays. In the centre is a semicircular portico with six unfluted Greek Doric columns. In the garden front at the rear are two two-storey bow windows. The hall is connected to the smaller houses by blind six-bay arcades with a moulded entablature. The Garden House has been extended to give it an L-shaped plan. The Small House has two storeys, three bays, and a hipped roof.	II
Barnfield Memorial; 52.61119°N 2.34829°W		Early 19th century	The memorial is in the churchyard of St Milburga's Church, and is to the memory of members of the Barnfield family. It is in ashlar stone, and consists of an octagonal pier about 1.2 metres (3 ft 11 in) high, with a moulded plinth and capping, and on the top is a vase with a cast iron urn finial.	II
Quarry House; 52.61214°N 2.34992°W		Early 19th century	A red brick house with a dentilled eaves cornice and a slate roof. There are two storeys, three bays, and flanking single-storey single-bay wings. In the centre is a doorway with a semicircular fanlight and an open pediment, and the windows are sashes.	II
Caynton Cottages; 52.62437°N 2.32180°W		Mid 19th century	A pair of estate workers' cottages in sandstone with applied timber framing and pebbledash infill, and a tiled roof. They have 1½ storeys, each cottage is gabled, and has a doorway with a casement window to the inside, and in the attic are two single-light windows. All the windows have diamond-shaped leading.	II
Ice house 52.61015°N 2.34858°W	—	Mid 19th century (probable)	A plain structure, which may have been an ice house or a beer cellar. The entrance has a large sandstone lintel, a flight of steps, and a brick barrel vault on red brick piers. The interior has compartments cut into the rock.	II
Primary School; 52.60966°N 2.34628°W		1852–53	The school is in red brick with dressings in yellow stone, a band, an eaves cornice, and a tiled roof with a central gable. There are two storeys and six bays, the ground floor originally the schoolmaster's house. The windows are small-paned casements with hood moulds, and the doorway has a Tudor arched head, also with a hood mould. There are 20th-century weatherboarded extensions.	II
War memorial 52.61144°N 2.34825°W		c. 1920	The war memorial is in the churchyard of St Milburga's Church. It is in red sandstone, and has a stepped platform, a base, a plinth and a tapering octagonal shaft with a moulded ring at the top. The shaft carries a cross with octagonal arms and with trefoil ends to the arms and the cap. On the base is an inscription and the names of those lost in the First World War, and on the steps of the platform is an inscription and details of those lost in the Second World War.	II
