= Beckbury =

Village and civil parish in Shropshire, England

Coordinates: 52.612°N 2.350°W

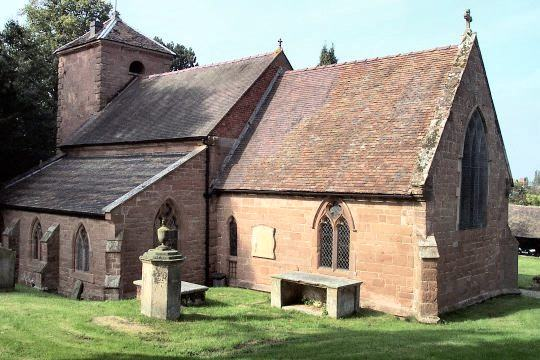
- St Milburga's Church, Beckbury

- Location within Shropshire
- Population: 341 (2011)
- OS grid reference: SJ765016
- Civil parish: Beckbury
- Unitary authority: Shropshire
- Ceremonial county: Shropshire
- Region: West Midlands
- Country: England
- Sovereign state: United Kingdom
- Post town: Shifnal
- Postcode district: TF11
- Dialling code: 01952
- Police: West Mercia
- Fire: Shropshire
- Ambulance: West Midlands
- UK Parliament: Ludlow

Beckbury is a village and civil parish in Shropshire, England. Beckbury had a population of 327 according to the 2001 census, increasing to 340 at the 2011 Census, The village is 8 miles (13 km) south-east of Telford and is close to the Staffordshire border. The small rural parish of Beckbury lies on the Shropshire–Staffordshire border 3.7 miles (6 km) south of Shifnal. It has a pub – the Smokey Cow, a Church of England school, a village hall, and a parish church dedicated to St Milburga (who was Abbess at Much Wenlock in Saxon times).

Beckbury makes up one of the six parishes of Beckbury, Ryton, Kemberton, Badger, Sutton Maddock and Stockton, which became a united benefice in 1989 (the first group of 6 parishes in the Diocese of Lichfield).

Beckbury was included in the Domesday Book and the name means Beocca's Fort or defended place (Beocca being someone's name).

The village was struck by an F0/T1 tornado on 23 November 1981, as part of the record-breaking nationwide tornado outbreak on that day.

== See also ==
- Listed buildings in Beckbury
