= Alfred Capel-Cure =

British photographer and officer (1826–1896)

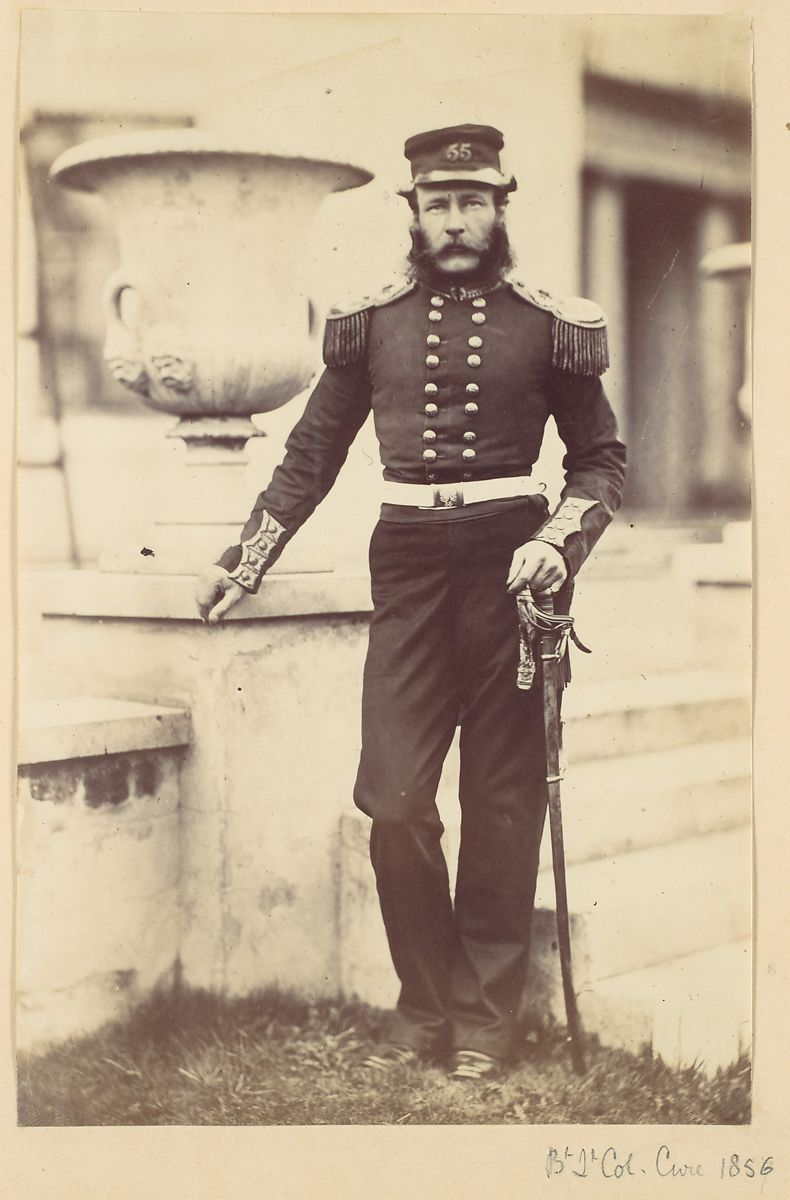
Capel-Cure in 1856, on his promotion to Brevet Lieutenant Colonel of the 55th Regiment of Foot during the Crimean War

Colonel Alfred Capel-Cure (8 December 1826 − 29 July 1896) was an officer in the British Army and a pioneer of photography.

He was the nephew of the watercolour painter and photographer Robert Henry Cheney, who introduced him to photography. His subjects were mostly architecture in England, Ireland, France and Gibraltar. He served in the Crimean War and was there wounded at Redan.

Capel-Cure was commissioned into the 55th Foot, but later transferred to the Grenadier Guards. He was promoted lieutenant-colonel in 1858 and colonel in 1863.

He was killed in an accidental explosion while dynamiting tree roots in his park.
