= Heseltine =

Heseltine is an English surname, and may refer to:

- Annabel Heseltine (born 1960), British journalist
- Bill Heseltine, Australian cyclist
- Catherine Heseltine (born 1978), British Muslim activist
- Christopher Heseltine (1869–1944), English cricketer
- James Heseltine (c.1690–1763), English organist
- John Postle Heseltine (1843–1929), British painter and art collector
- Mary Jermyn Heseltine (1910–2002) Australian pathologist
- Michael Heseltine (born 1933), British politician
- Michael Heseltine (civil servant) (1886–1952), English civil servant
- Nigel Heseltine (1916–1995), Welsh writer
- Peter Heseltine (born 1965), English cricketer
- Philip Heseltine, British composer known as Peter Warlock (1894–1930)
- Philip Heseltine (born 1960), English cricketer
- S. R. Heseltine (1849–1920), riverboat captain and horse racing official in South Australia
- Wayne Heseltine (born 1969), English footballer
- William Heseltine (1930–2026), former Private Secretary to Queen Elizabeth II

== See also ==
- Haseltine
- Heselton
- Hazeldine (disambiguation)
- Hazeltine (disambiguation)
