= Hazledine =

Hazledine is a surname. Notable people with the surname include:

- William C. Hazledine (1833–1892), American lawyer, state legislator and judge
- William Hazledine (1763–1840), English ironmaster

== See also ==
- Hazledine and Company, ironworks
- Hazeldine (disambiguation)
- Hazeltine (disambiguation)
