= Hazeldine =

Hazeldine may refer to:

== People with the surname ==
- Alan Hazeldine (1948–2008), British pianist and conductor
- Andrew Hazeldine (born 1994), British and New Zealand cricketer
- Angela Hazeldine (born 1981), Welsh actress and musician
- James Hazeldine (1947–2002), British actor
- John Hazledine (1760–1810), English ironworker and engineer
- Max Hazeldine (born 1997), English professional footballer
- Sam Hazeldine (born 1972), English actor
- Stuart Hazeldine (born 1971), British screenwriter, film producer and director

== Other uses ==
- Hazeldine (band), an American alternative country band

== See also ==
- Hazledine (disambiguation)
- Hazeldean (disambiguation)
- Hazeltine (disambiguation)
- Heseltine
