= Heselton =

Heselton is a surname. Notable people with the surname include one of the following individuals:

- Bernard Heselton (1903–1981), American football coach in the United States
- Francis Heselton Helme (1899–1984), Liberal party member of the Canadian House of Commons
- John W. Heselton (1900–1962), Republican member of the United States House of Representatives
- Philip Heselton (born 1946), retired British Conservation Officer and Wiccan initiate

== See also ==
- Doehling-Heselton Memorial Trophy, football trophy awarded annually
- Haseltonia
- Heseltine
- Jesselton
