= Bridgnorth Castle =

Ruined Norman castle in Shropshire, England

- Shropshire, England
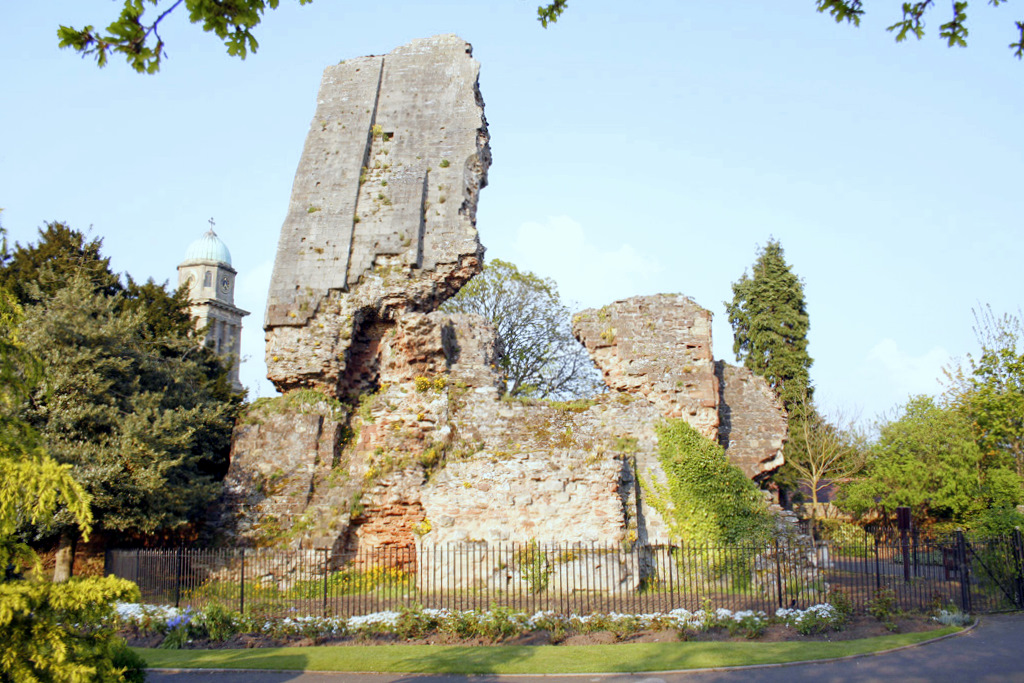
- Bridgnorth Castle in 2008

Site information
- Type: Castle
- Open to the public: Yes
- Condition: Ruined

Location
- Shown within Shropshire.
- Coordinates: 52.5314°N 2.4201°W
- Grid reference: grid reference SO716927

Site history
- In use: 1101–1646
- Events: English Civil War

Bridgnorth Castle is a castle in the town of Bridgnorth, Shropshire. It is a scheduled monument, first listed in 1928.

== History ==
=== 11th century ===
The castle was founded in 1101 by Robert de Belleme, the son of the French Earl, Roger de Montgomery, who succeeded his father as Earl of Shrewsbury, possibly on the site of a Saxon burh built by Æthelflæd in 912. One year later in 1102, King Henry I took control of the castle from Robert de Belleme and Henry built another temporary castle on Panpudding Hill. Much of the outer building, which consists of shattered walls, dates to a period of construction that is believed to have occurred between 1105 and 1113.

Around 1120, Henry I re-plastered the walls of the castle and replaced them with better quality stone. Its principal feature, a square great tower, was built during the reign of Henry II in 1160 and the castle was extended between 1166 and 1174. In the early 13th century, construction to extend the castle continued.

=== 13th-16th centuries ===
A turret or mural tower, present in 1160, was extended in 1226 and the barbican, with a drawbridge, was built in 1212 and was first mentioned in 1221. In 1242, the outer bailey, which does not survive today, was legally made part of the town and in 1261, the sheriff of Bridgnorth was ordered to roof and repair the houses within the bailey of the castle. By 1267, the castle had begun to lose its significance and it was in disrepair by 1281.

In 1321, the barons who rebelled against King Edward II of England during the Despenser War took control of the castle but by the mid 14th century, the castle had lost most of its strategic importance again due to the Black Death and it was largely forgotten about by the 15th century.

It was noted as being in disrepair during the start of Henry VIII's reign (1509 – 1547) and it was partially repaired around 1530. John Leland visited Bridgnorth Castle in 1540 and his description of Bridgnorth Castle is as following:

The Walles of it be of great height. There were 2 or 3 stronge wardes in the castle, that now goe totally to ruine. I count the castle to be more in compasse than a third part of the town. There is one mighty gate by north in it, now stopped up, and a little posterne made of force thereby through the wall to enter into the castle. The castle ground and especially the base court, hath now many dwellinge houses of tymbre in it newly erected.

— John Leyland

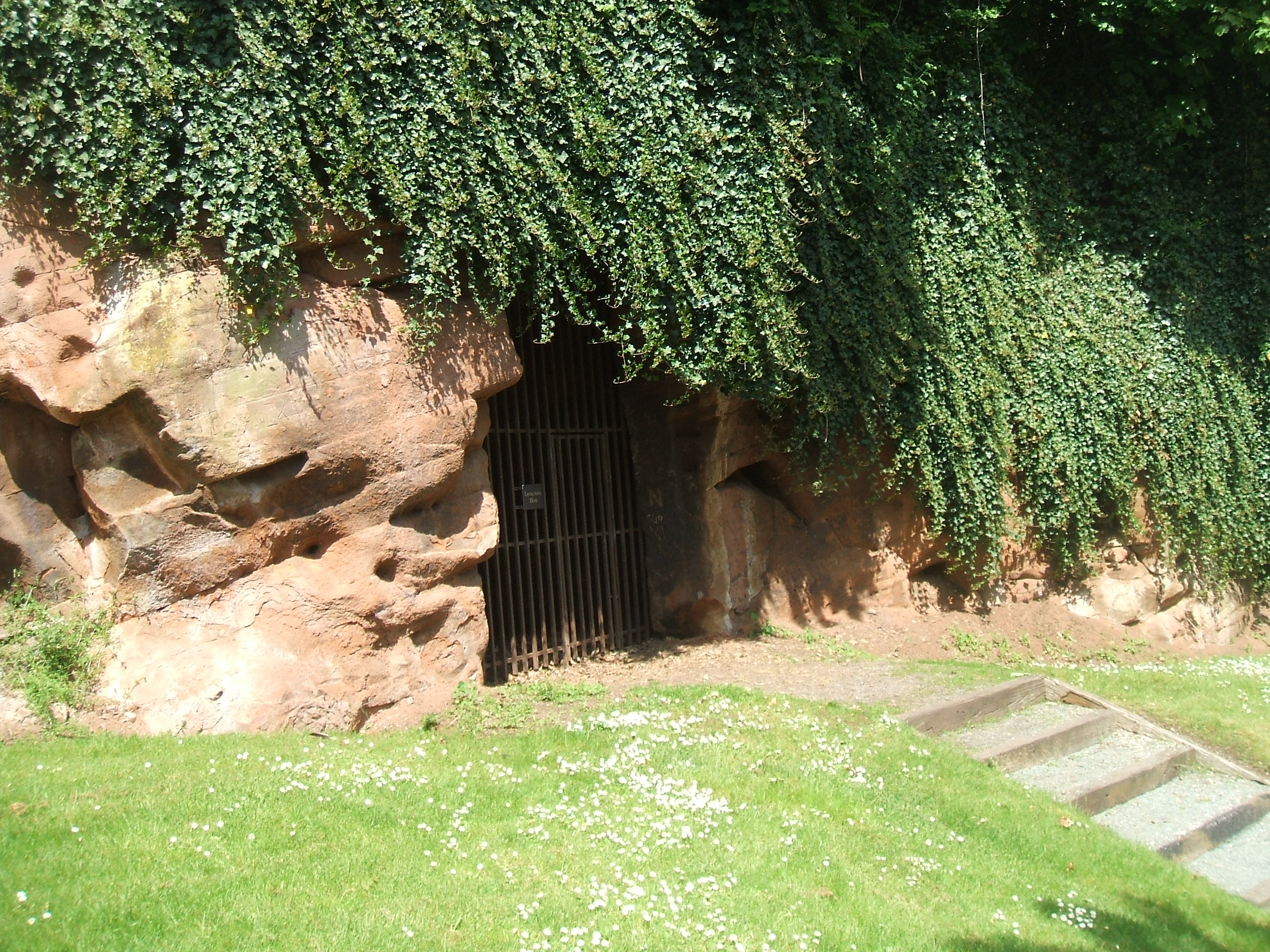
Lavington's Hole in 2013

=== 17th-21st centuries ===
In 1642, King Charles I described Bridgnorth and its castle as "the finest in my domain". During the Civil War, Bridgnorth was one of the Midlands' main Royalist strongholds and in 1642 many Royalist troops were garrisoned there.

The castle was partly slighted in 1645 and in 1646, Cromwell’s Roundheads arrived with orders to take Bridgnorth for the Parliamentarians from the garrison led by Sir Robert Howard. Following a three-week siege starting on 31 March 1646, Cromwell was successful and he ordered that the castle be demolished. Before this a team of men led by engineer Colonel Lavington dug a 21 meters (69 ft) long tunnel, now known as Lavington's Hole, into Castle Hill to try and blow up the gunpowder stored inside the Church of St. Mary Magdalene. The tunnel was abandoned after the Royalists surrendered to Cromwell. Lavington's Hole became one of many other holes within Castle Hill now known as the Hermitage Caves, many of which were supposedly dug during the 10th century by the Anglo-Saxon historian Æthelweard, and the tunnels are now no longer accessible to the public due to safety concerns.

By 1647 little of the structure remained. The Parliamentarians left it much as it is today, the stone from the castle being taken and used to repair the town's damaged buildings starting from 1647. The royal palace, known as the "King's House" was still maintained as a royal residence until later in the 17th century, after the Civil war ended.

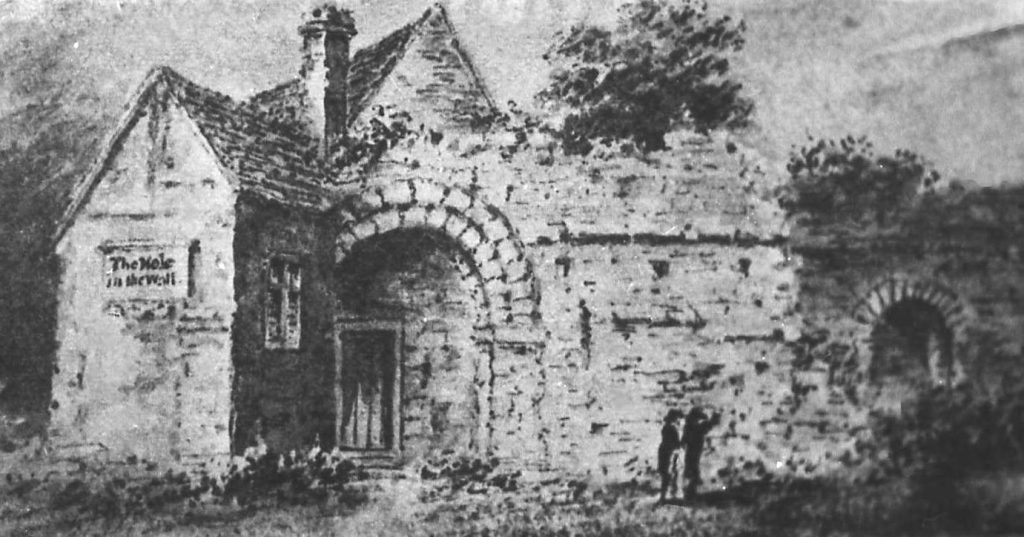
Ruins of the postern gate incorporated into the now demolished public house The Hole in The Wall, illustrated c. 1821

In 1821, The Hole in The Wall, a public house built against ruins of the castle, was demolished and the postern (northern) bailey gate belonging to the castle was discovered. It was planned to be kept standing but later that year, the bailey gate was demolished by being blown up with gunpowder as it heavily obstructed traffic.

Parts of the great tower still remain, but because of the damage caused during the Civil War, it now leans at an angle of 15 degrees, four times the lean of the leaning tower of Pisa. By 1900, the castle was overgrown by moss and it was beginning to go into another state of disrepair, but in 1956, the castle was donated to the town council and the overgrowing shrubbery and moss were cleaned off the ruins. In 1945, the ruined barbican was discovered and in 2001, the castle grounds were excavated over three days by archaeological television programme Time Team, clarifying the layout of the castle and the history of its construction.

After the First World War the town war memorial, topped by the statue of an infantryman by Adrian Jones, was erected in the castle grounds.

== See also ==
- Castles in Great Britain and Ireland
- List of castles in England
