= Haseltine =

Haseltine is a surname. Notable people with the surname include:

- Dan Haseltine (born 1973), American singer
- Eric Haseltine (born 1951), American technologist
- Florence Pat Haseltine (born 1942), American physician
- Herbert Haseltine (1877–1962), Italian-born French/American animalier sculptor
- William A. Haseltine (born 1944), American biologist and entrepreneur
- William Stanley Haseltine (1835–1900), American painter and draftsman
- Mara G. Haseltine (born 1971), American artist and environmental activist

== See also ==
- Edward Knox Haseltine House
- Haseltine, Missouri
- William A. Haseltine House
- Heseltine
