= Bridgnorth League =

Bridgnorth and District Football League
- Founded: 1925, 1938
- Folded: 1936, 2001
- Country: England

The Bridgnorth and District Football League (commonly known as the Bridgnorth League) was an association football league in Shropshire, based around the town of Bridgnorth. It was founded in 1925, after a failed attempt to form a league a year earlier. It folded in 1936 due to a lack of teams but was reformed just two years later. It was believed to be the oldest league in Shropshire when it folded in 2001.

Towards the end of its existence it was described as a "starter league for clubs wishing to progress to a higher standard" and having been a "solid grounding for younger players".

== History ==
On the evening of Monday 25 February 1924, a meeting was held at the clubroom of Woodman Athletic Football Club to discuss the formation of a Bridgnorth and District League. Eight clubs were represented – Woodman Athletic, St Mary's, St Leonard's, Linley, Highley, Chelmarsh, Eardington, and Glazeley – and apologies were received from several others. It can be assumed that this league was not formed, as no results are reported.

On Friday 21 August 1925, a meeting was held at the Blue Coat School, described as the new league's "first meeting". The Blue Coat School became the league's headquarters. A silver cup was donated to the league by Rev. Southwell of Chetton, for the league champions, and medals would be given to the individual players. The league's inaugural champions were St Leonard's, and the cup was presented to them after a 5–3 loss to a "Pick of League" team.

In August 1936, it was reported that the league was under threat of folding, with just two clubs present at its annual general meeting. Two weeks later, it had become certain that the league would not be played for the 1936–37 season. By July 1937, there had been multiple unsuccessful attempts to reform the league. In July 1938, the league was reformed, which the league secretary said was thanks to the efforts of Mr. W. Huson.

The league was played throughout World War II.

For the 1972–73 season the league introduced a second division. Wheathill United were the first winners of the new Division Two. Worfield were Division Two champions in 1973–74 and by 1974–75 the league had reverted to one division.

In 1990 Tom Farmer, chairman of the Wellington League, proposed that local leagues including the Bridgnorth League should feed into the Shropshire County League.

In August 2001, it was reported that the league had just five teams intending to compete for the following season. They were Bridgnorth 2000, Shakespeare, Woodberry '98, Norton, and Claverley. Four more sides had competed in the 2000–01 season and left – Wrockwardine Wood United joined the Shropshire County League, Castle Inn joined the Kidderminster League, and Inter Valley and Worfield both folded. The league did indeed fold, and four of its surviving teams (all bar Norton) joined the Telford Combination for the 2001–02 season. At the time of its folding, it was believed to be the oldest league in Shropshire.

== Division One champions ==
=== 1920s ===
- 1925–26: St Leonard's
- 1926–27: Broseley Victoria? (Note: Broseley Victoria were top of the Bridgnorth and District League in May 1927. Broseley Victoria played a match against Newtown later that month, described as a "meeting of the Bridgnorth and Madeley League Champions". However Bridgnorth St Mary's were described as having won a second title in a row in 1928.)
- 1927–28: Bridgnorth St Mary's
- 1928–29: Whitehall Rovers
- 1929–30: Coalbrookdale Old Boys

=== 1930s ===
- 1930–31: Whitehall Rovers
- 1931–32: St Leonard's
- 1932–33: Ditton Priors
- 1933–34: Coalbrookdale Old Boys
- 1934–35: Coalbrookdale Old Boys
- 1935–36: Ditton Priors
- 1936–37: not running
- 1937–38: not running
- 1938–39: Bridgnorth St Leonard's
- 1939–40: Posenhall Rovers

=== 1940s ===
- 1940–41: Madeley C.C.
- 1941–42: Madeley C.C.
- 1942–43: Highley M.W.
- 1943–44: R.A.F. Bridgnorth (1)
- 1944–45: Alveley M.W.
- 1945–46: Madeley M.W.
- 1946–47: Broseley Athletic
- 1947–48: Madeley M.W.
- 1948–49: Madeley M.W.
- 1949–50: Stirchley United

=== 1950s ===
- 1950–51: Much Wenlock
- 1951–52: R.A.F. Bridgnorth
- 1952–53: R.A.F. Bridgnorth
- 1953–54: Bridgnorth Town reserves
- 1954–55: Brown Clee North
- 1955–56: Brown Clee North
- 1956–57: Friars
- 1957–58:
- 1958–59:
- 1959–60:

=== 1960s ===
- 1960–61:
- 1961–62:
- 1962–63:
- 1963–64:
- 1964–65: Ditton Priors
- 1965–66: Brown Clee
- 1966–67: Star Aluminium
- 1967–68: Wheathill United
- 1968–69: Beckbury Y.C.
- 1969–70: Claverley

=== 1970s ===
- 1970–71: Star Aluminium
- 1971–72: Friars Social Club
- 1972–73:
- 1973–74: Star Aluminium
- 1974–75: Claverley
- 1975–76: Star Aluminium
- 1976–77:
- 1977–78:
- 1978–79:
- 1979–80: Plough Inn

=== 1980s ===
- 1980–81: Plough Inn
- 1981–82:
- 1982–83: Riverside Sports
- 1983–84: Riverside Sports
- 1984–85: Tavern
- 1985–86: Bache Arms
- 1986–87: Claverley
- 1987–88: Broseley Wood
- 1988–89: Broseley Wood
- 1989–90: New Inn

=== 1990s ===
- 1990–91: Claverley
- 1991–92: Claverley
- 1992–93: Claverley
- 1993–94: Elephant and Castle
- 1994–95: Norton
- 1995–96: Norton
- 1996–97: Norton
- 1997–98: Albion Broseley
- 1998–99: Claverley
- 1999–2000: Randlay Farmhouse

=== 2000s ===
- 2000–01: Norton

== Division Two champions ==
- 1972–73: Wheathill United
- 1973–74: Worfield
