= Philip Heseltine =

Philip Heseltine may refer to:

- Peter Warlock, pseudonym of Philip Arnold Heseltine (1894–1930), Anglo-Welsh composer and music critic
- Phillip Heseltine (cricketer) (born 1960), former English cricketer
