= Bridgnorth =

Town in Shropshire, England

Coordinates: 52.535°N 2.4195°W

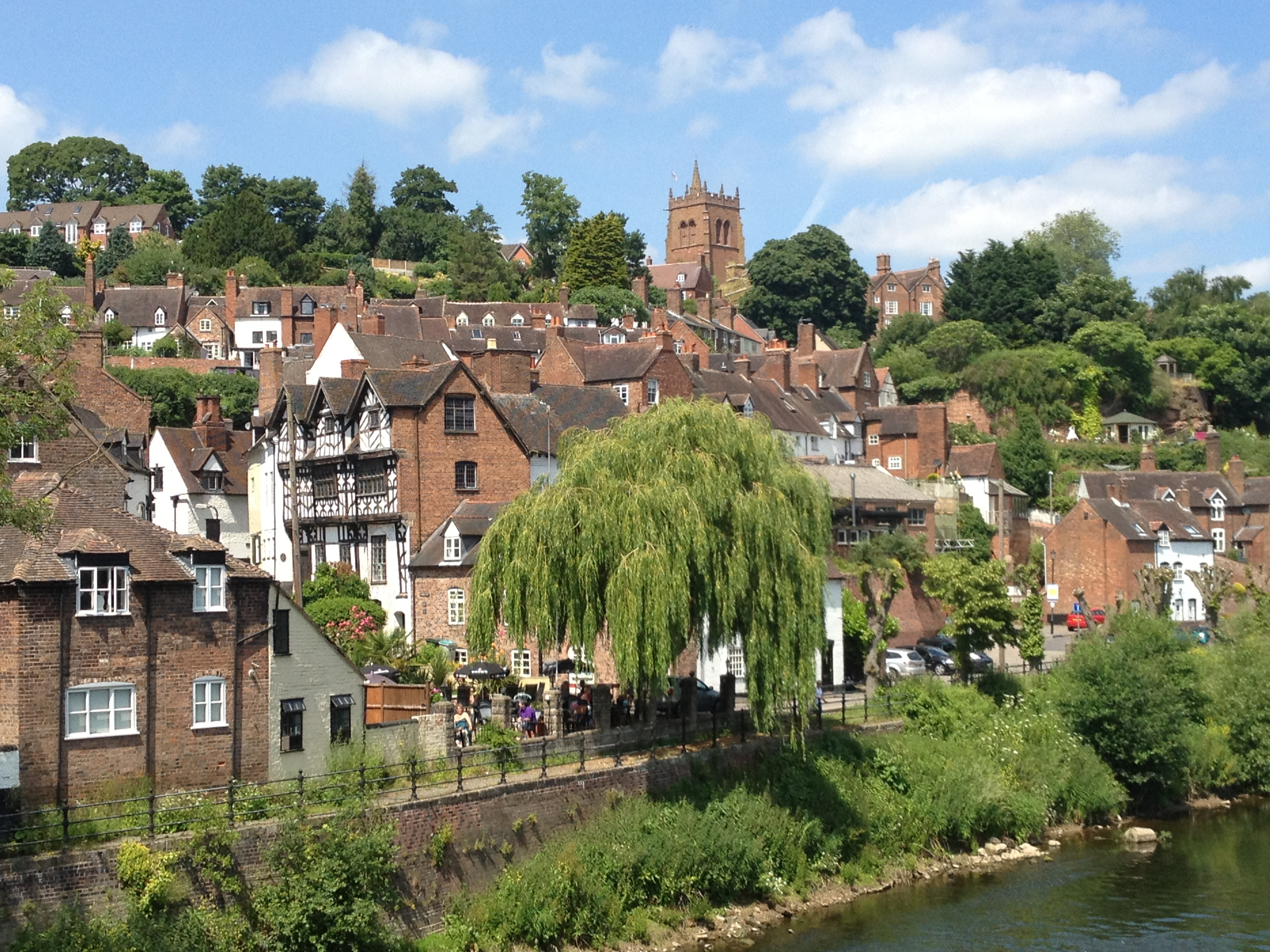
- High Town from the River Severn

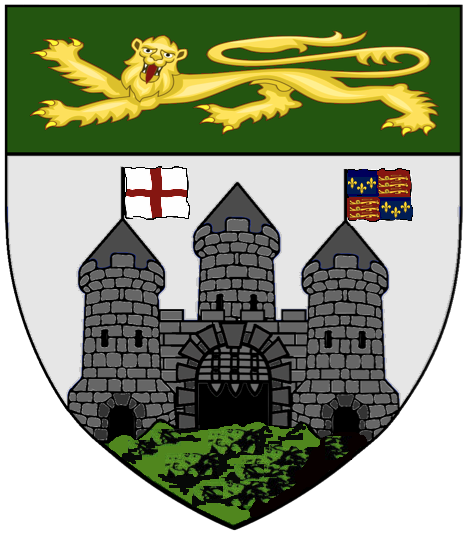
- Coat of arms of Bridgnorth; Motto: Fidelitas Urbis Salus Regis; In the town's loyalty lies the King's safety

- Location within Shropshire
- Population: 12,079 (2011)
- OS grid reference: SO716927
- Civil parish: Bridgnorth
- Unitary authority: Shropshire
- Ceremonial county: Shropshire
- Region: West Midlands
- Country: England
- Sovereign state: United Kingdom
- Post town: BRIDGNORTH
- Postcode district: WV15, WV16
- Dialling code: 01746
- Police: West Mercia
- Fire: Shropshire
- Ambulance: West Midlands
- UK Parliament: South Shropshire

Bridgnorth is a market town and civil parish in Shropshire, England, named after a bridge over the River Severn. the town into High Town and Low Town, the upper town on its west bank and the lower on its east bank. The population at the 2011 Census was 12,079.

== History ==
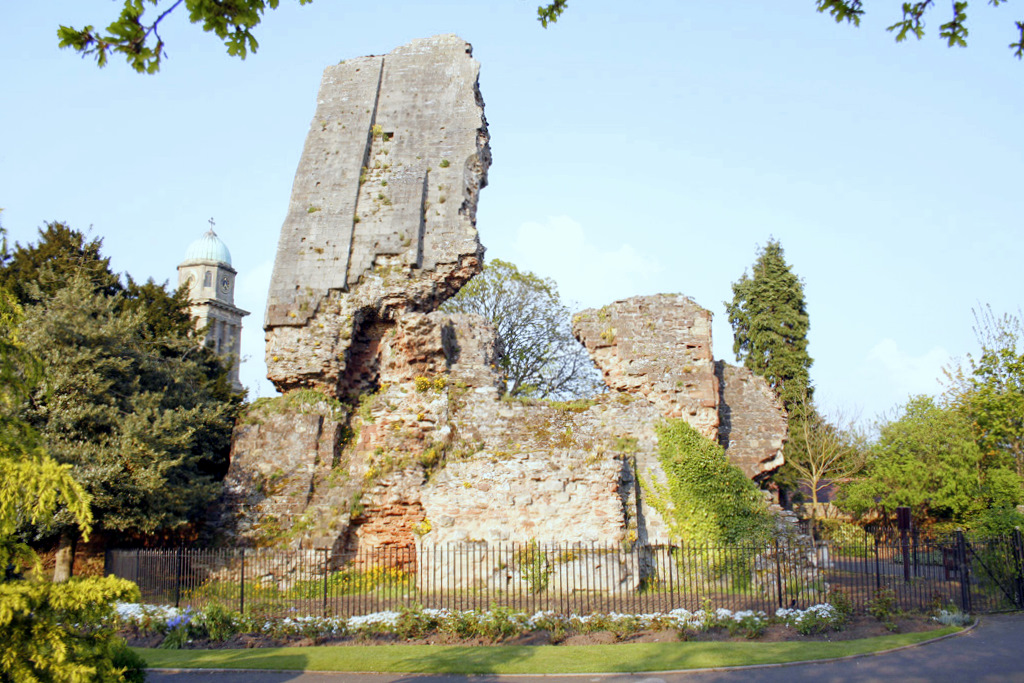
The ruins of Bridgnorth Castle

Bridgnorth is named after a bridge over the River Severn, which was built further north than an earlier bridge at Quatford. The earliest historical reference to the town is in 895, when it is recorded that the Danes created a camp at Cwatbridge; subsequently in 912, Æthelflæd constructed a mound on the west bank of the River Severn, or possibly on the site of Bridgnorth Castle, as part of an offensive against the Danes. Earliest names for Bridgnorth include Brigge, Brug and Bruges, all referring to its position on the Severn.

After the Norman conquest, William I granted the manor of Bridgnorth to Roger de Montgomerie. The town itself was not created until 1101, when Robert of Bellême, 3rd Earl of Shrewsbury, the son of Roger de Montgomerie, moved from Quatford, constructing a castle and a church on the site of the modern-day town. The town became a royal borough on Robert Bellême's attainder in 1102. The castle's purpose was to defend against attacks from Wales. The town was attacked and burnt by Roger Mortimer, 1st Earl of March during the Despenser War in 1322. A small Jewish community was established in the town in 1267, but was expelled in 1274; one of the community was arrested in a campaign against alleged Jewish coin clipping, a prelude towards Edward I's Edict of Expulsion in 1290.

Bridgnorth's town walls were initially constructed in timber between 1216 and 1223; murage grants allowed them to be upgraded to stone between the 13th and 15th centuries. By the 16th century, the antiquarian John Leland reported them in ruins and of the five gates, only one survives today.

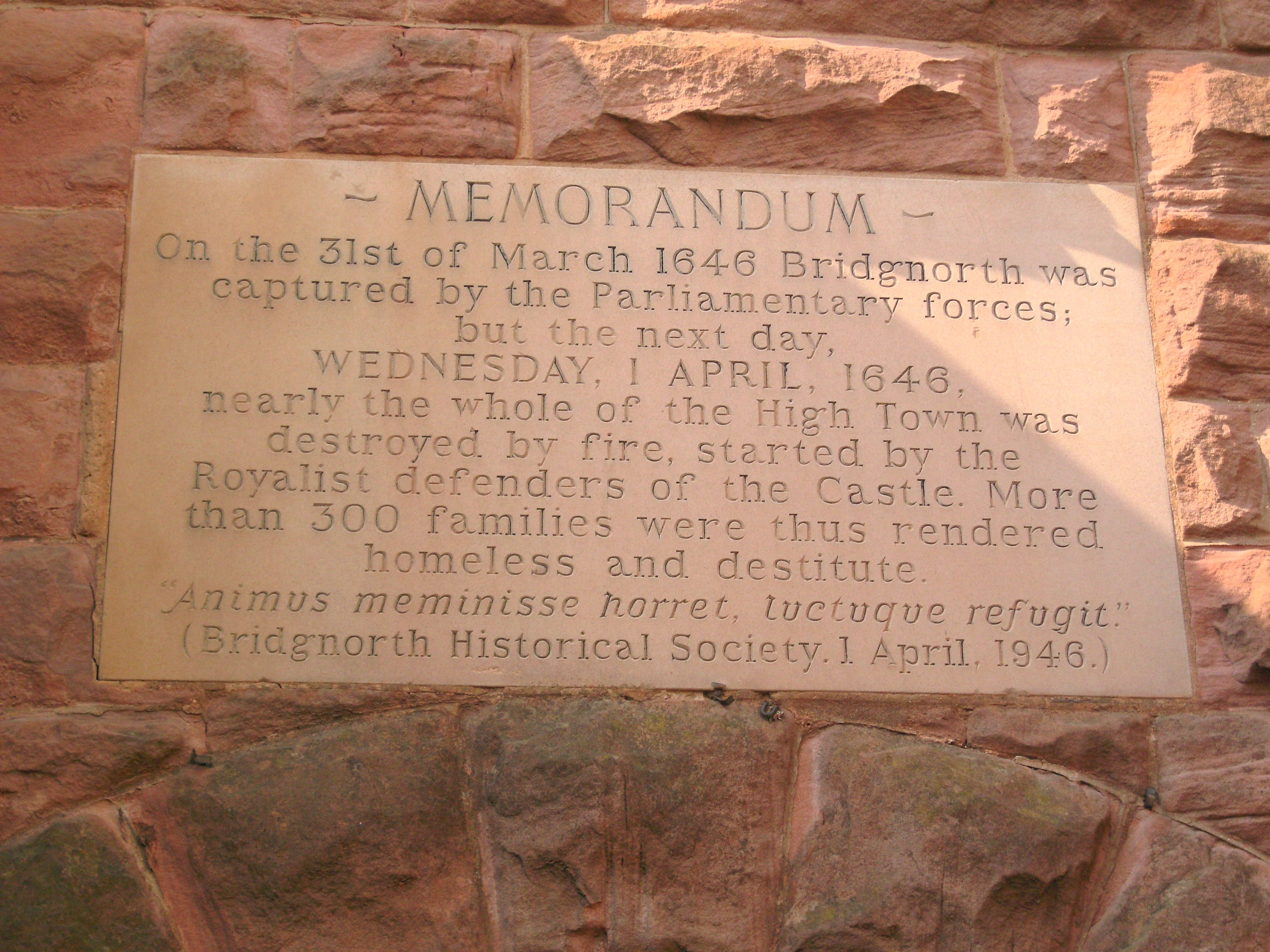
Inscription on Bridgnorth Museum, commemorating the deliberate destruction of the town by royalist forces, commanded by Sir Thomas Wolryche of Dudmaston Hall

It is probable that Henry I granted the burgesses certain privileges, for Henry II confirmed to them all the franchises and customs which they had had in the time of Henry I. King John in 1215 granted them freedom from toll throughout England except the city of London, and in 1227 Henry III conferred several new rights and liberties, among which were a gild merchant with a hanse. These early charters were confirmed by several succeeding kings, Henry VI granting in addition Assize of Bread and Ale and other privileges. The burgesses were additionally granted two fairs: a yearly fair on the feast of the Translation of St Leonard and the three following days was granted in 1359, and in 1630 Charles I granted them licence to hold another fair on the Thursday before the first week in Lent and two following days. The burgesses returned two members to parliament in 1295, and continued to do so until 1867, when they were assigned only one member. The town was disfranchised in 1885.

During the Civil War, Bridgnorth was one of the Midlands' main Royalist strongholds, and in 1642 many Royalist troops were garrisoned there. In 1646, Cromwell's Roundheads arrived with orders to take Bridgnorth for the Parliamentarians from the garrison led by Sir Robert Howard. After a three-week siege, Cromwell was successful and he ordered that the castle be demolished.

Bridgnorth had an ironworks in Low Town run by Hazledine and Company which in 1808 built the locomotive Catch Me Who Can designed and promoted by Richard Trevithick. A plaque on the foundry's site commemorates this association.

By 1824, the borough and liberties of Bridgnorth were well defined.

The population of the municipal borough in 1841 was 6,198, and that of the town was 5,770.

More than 255 men from the Bridgnorth area volunteered in the first months of the First World War. Their names were published in the Bridgnorth Journal on 26 December 1914 and those killed in action are remembered on the war memorial, sculpted by Adrian Jones, in the castle grounds.

Until 1961 the Royal Air Force's initial recruit training unit was at RAF Bridgnorth, a station opened in 1939. During the Second World War, two women were killed in a German air raid in August 1940 when bombs hit neighbouring houses in High Town. In 2005, unverified German papers dating from 1941 were found, outlining new details about Operation Sea Lion, the military plans of Nazi Germany for an invasion of Britain. Two quiet Shropshire towns were mentioned in the documentation: Ludlow and Bridgnorth. Some experts believe that it was Hitler's intention to make Bridgnorth his personal headquarters in Britain, due to its central position in the UK, rural location, rail connections and airfield.

In 1978, Bridgnorth was twinned with the French town of Thiers, and in 1992 it also twinned with the Bavarian town of Schrobenhausen, Germany that had already twinned with Thiers a few years earlier. On 21 August 2003 Bridgnorth was granted Fairtrade Town status.

== Geography ==
The town is in the Severn Valley, where the river passes through a relatively narrow valley with largely-wooded slopes. High Town, the part of the town sited on the west side of the Severn, is built on a notable promontory, at the southern end of which the castle was constructed, and is known as Castle Hill. Low Town is on lower-lying ground on the banks of the river. High Town is at an elevation of 65–68 metres (213–223 feet) above sea level, whilst Low Town is at 32–33 metres (105 feet). The lie of the land of Low Town is less hilly but then rises steeply to its immediate east.

The West Midlands Green Belt covers the countryside to the east of the Severn and the settlement.

The civil parish includes Danesford, Oldbury and Quatford.

== Landmarks ==
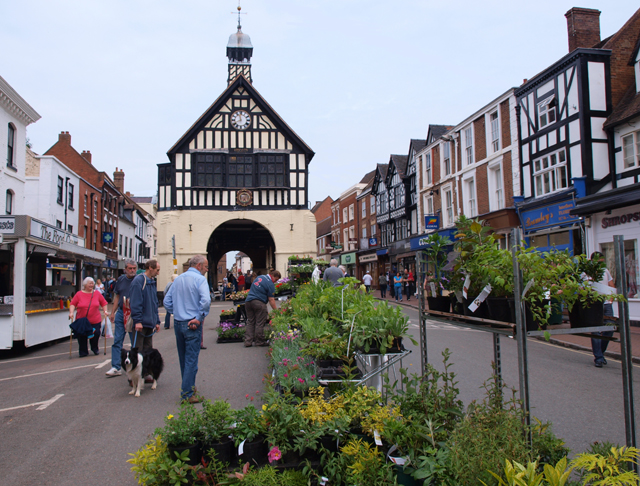
Bridgnorth High Street with town hall (built 1652)

Bridgnorth is home to a funicular railway that links the High and Low towns, the Castle Hill Railway, which is the steepest and only inland railway of its type in England. Additionally, within the High Town is Bridgnorth railway station on the Severn Valley Railway, which runs southwards to Kidderminster. The ruins of Bridgnorth Castle, built in 1101, are present in the town. Due to damage caused during the English Civil War, the castle is inclined at an angle of 15 degrees.

High Town has two prominent Church of England churches. Church of St. Mary Magdalene, Bridgnorth, a church built in the classic style of the late 18th century, was designed by Thomas Telford; and is still used for worship. St. Leonard's was formerly collegiate, and Bridgnorth was a Royal Peculiar until 1856. It was subsequently largely rebuilt but is no longer used for regular worship. It has many community uses and is in the care of the Churches Conservation Trust.

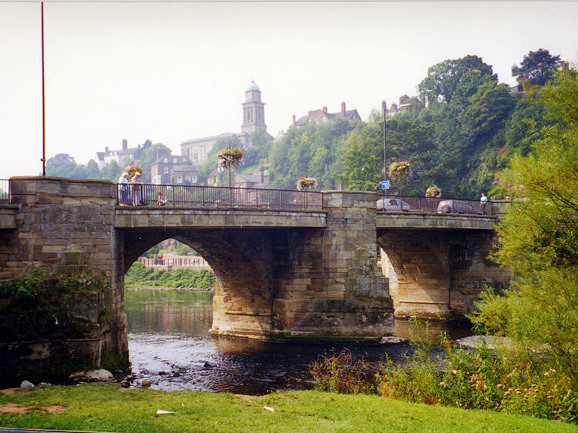
View from Low Town towards High Town and St Mary Magdalene's

Bishop Percy's House on the Cartway was built in 1580 by Richard Forster and has been a Grade I listed building since 18 July 1949. It was one of the few properties of its type to survive the great fire of Bridgnorth in April 1646, and was the birthplace of Thomas Percy (Bishop of Dromore), author of 'Reliques of Ancient English Poetry'.

Other notable buildings in the town are the 17th century Bridgnorth Town Hall, a half-timbered building, and a surviving town gate the Northgate which houses the museum. Daniel's Mill, a well known watermill is situated a short distance along the River Severn from Bridgnorth.

The remains of an old hermitage can be seen from the high town, they are commonly called The Queens Parlor by locals. One local legend tells of its occupation in AD 925 by a hermit called Ethelred or Ethelwald, a grandson to Alfred the Great. This may not be such an unlikely story as Bridgnorth was founded in 912 by Alfred the Great's daughter Aethelflaed.

== Education ==
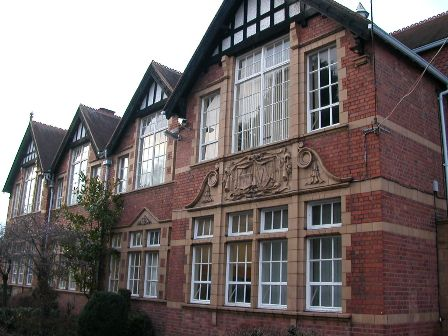
Bridgnorth Endowed School's Northgate building was once home to the town's grammar school

There are a number of primary schools in Bridgnorth, including: Castlefields County Primary School, two Church of England schools, St Mary's and St Leonard's; the Roman Catholic St John's school; and, in addition, the Morville and Brown Clee schools in Morville and Ditton Priors.

The town has two secondary schools: Oldbury Wells School and Bridgnorth Endowed School (previously named Bridgnorth Grammar School). These serve the town and its outlying villages, including Alveley and Highley.

There is no sixth form in Bridgnorth, with provision at Bridgnorth Endowed School and Oldbury Wells School fully phased out by 2025. In September 2023, Telford College partnered with both Bridgnorth secondary schools to develop new joint post-16 courses and learning pathways. Along with Telford College, Shrewsbury Sixth Form College and Thomas Telford School now provide the majority of post-16 education.

== Culture ==
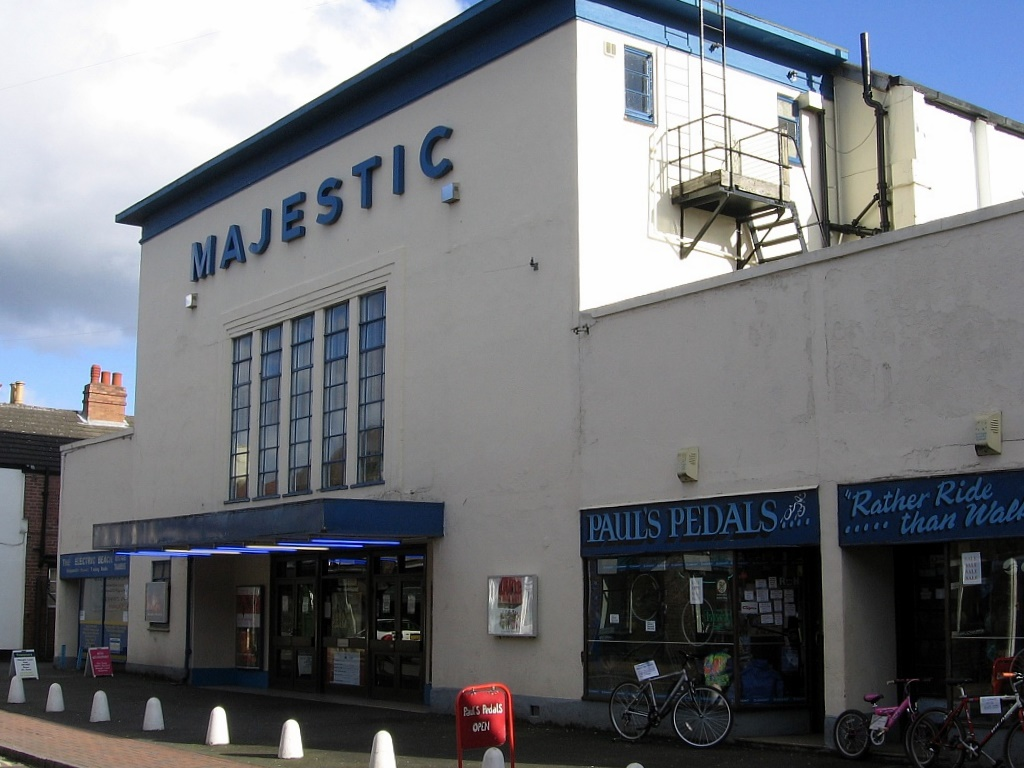
The town's art-deco Majestic Cinema

There is a theatre, the Theatre on the Steps, and a 1930s cinema, the Majestic. The Northgate Museum contains many artefacts connected with the town and surrounding area. It was the first independent museum in Shropshire to be accredited by the Museums, Libraries and Archives Council. The town has an orchestra, Bridgnorth Sinfonia, which performers regular concerts in St Mary's Church in East Castle Street.

=== Sport and clubs ===
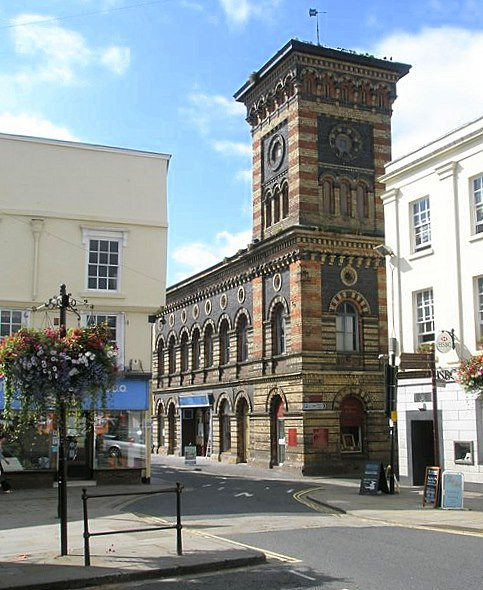
The New Market Hall building at the top of Bridgnorth's High Street

Bridgnorth Town F.C. was the football club based in Bridgnorth. They joined the Worcestershire Combination in 1938 and twice reached the 5th round of the FA Vase. They won the championship of the West Midlands (Regional) League Premier Division in 2008. Affiliated to the club was the junior section known as "Bridgnorth Town Juniors". The teams ranged from under 8s to under 16s and competed in the Telford Junior League. After folding in 2013, the club was effectively replaced by "phoenix club" A.F.C. Bridgnorth. Bridgnorth Spartans Juniors Football Club run junior and adult teams. These teams include boys' teams, ranging from Under-8s to Under-15s, girls' teams and women's teams. Home games are played at Oldbury Wells School.

The Bridgnorth and District Football League was played in the area from 1925 to 2001.

Bridgnorth Rowing Club occupies 'The Maltings' building on the edge of Severn Park, which was purchased by the club in 1983. Work to convert the malting building into the boat house started in 1993. It competes in events in the local region and further afield, including attending the annual Head of the River Race on the Thames in London, and hosts an annual regatta with racing along the length of the Severn Park.

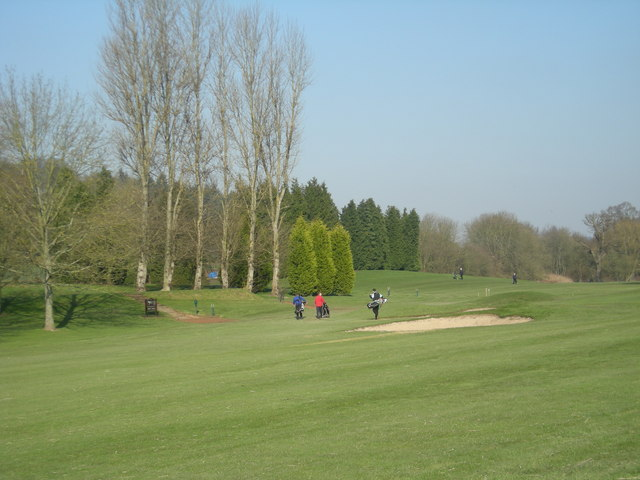
Bridgnorth Golf Club is home to an 18-hole course

Bridgnorth Army Cadets is the oldest Army Cadet detachment in Shropshire. The Army Cadet Force (ACF) in 2010 celebrated 150 years.

In 2007, Bridgnorth hosted the UK Downhill Street Race in cycling.

In January 2010, the Kidderminster branch of Stagecoach Theatre Arts expanded to Bridgnorth, providing the town with a part-time performing arts school for people of ages between 6 and 18. The Kidderminster School is now named "Stagecoach Kidderminster & Bridgnorth".

=== Media ===
Local news and television programmes are provided by BBC West Midlands and ITV Central. Television signals are received from the Wrekin and the local relay TV transmitters.

Local radio stations are BBC Radio Shropshire, Heart West Midlands, Capital North West and Wales, Smooth West Midlands, Hits Radio Black Country & Shropshire, Greatest Hits Radio Black Country & Shropshire, and Severnvalley Radio, an independent local radio station for South Shropshire & North Worcestershire .

The town is served by the local newspaper, Shropshire Star (formerly Bridgnorth Journal).

== Transport ==
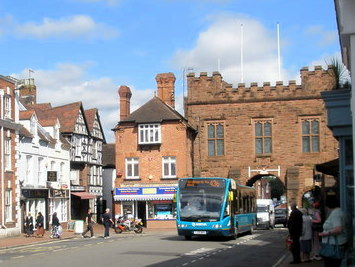
The Arriva Midlands 436 bus service to Shrewsbury enters Bridgnorth through Northgate

=== Roads ===
Bridgnorth grew initially as a market town at the centre of a system of local radial roads linking it with more rural, smaller settlements. Many of these roads crossed Bridgnorth at the point on the High Street where the town hall now stands. The River Severn historically also played a major role as a trading connection for the town, but is no longer generally navigable this far upstream.

Bridgnorth is connected to Shrewsbury and Stourbridge by the A458 road, Telford and Kidderminster by the A442 road, and Wolverhampton via the A454 road. The town is 11 miles (18 km) from the M54 motorway, at Telford.

The A458 passes to the south of the town centre on a by-pass, construction of which was started in 1982 and now serves to relieve the town centre of the congestion that once plagued it. The bypass also provided a second bridge across the Severn at Bridgnorth, which remains the only local alternative to the historic bridge that connects Low and High towns.

=== Buses ===
The town is served by buses to and from Telford, Shrewsbury, Wolverhampton, Much Wenlock, Ironbridge, Shifnal and Kidderminster. These are operated by Arriva Midlands, Select Bus Services, and Diamond Bus.

=== Railway ===
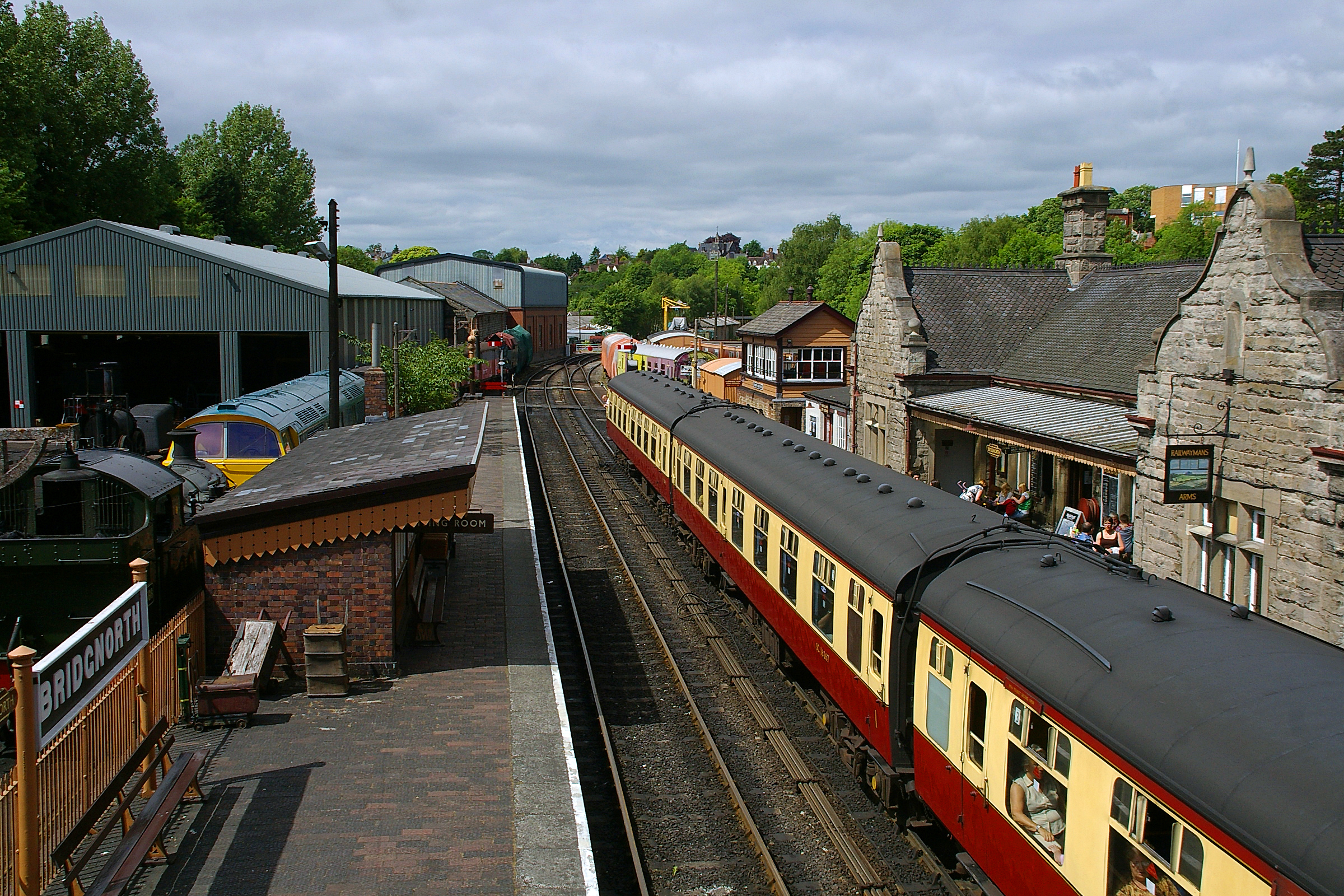
Bridgnorth station is the current northern terminus of the Severn Valley Railway.

Currently the closest active railway stations on the National Rail network are Shifnal and Cosford, providing connections to the West Midlands and Mid Wales. However, Bridgnorth does still have a station on an active heritage line, the Severn Valley Railway. Bridgnorth station was not the northern terminus of this line when built, but the main intermediate station, being 18 1/4 miles from Hartlebury and 22 1/2 miles from Shrewsbury. The station, which was opened to the public by the SVR on 1 February 1862, was passed to Great Western Railway (GWR) and then eventually to British Railways in 1948. It closed to passengers after 101 years of service on 8 September 1963 and to freight traffic on 30 November 1963. Although thought by some to have been closed as part of the Beeching cuts, its planned closure pre-dated his report.

The neo-Jacobean station is the only listed railway station on the Severn Valley Railway. Necessitating that, any future plans to enhance visitor facilities will need to be carefully designed to be in keeping with the railway station's architecture and historic character.

The line now ends just north of the modern-day station, where the line formerly bridged Hollybush Road and passed through Bridgnorth Tunnel and on to the next station on the line, Linley. There exists an ongoing debate whether the railway should extend beyond its current limits north of Bridgnorth.

=== Cliff railway ===
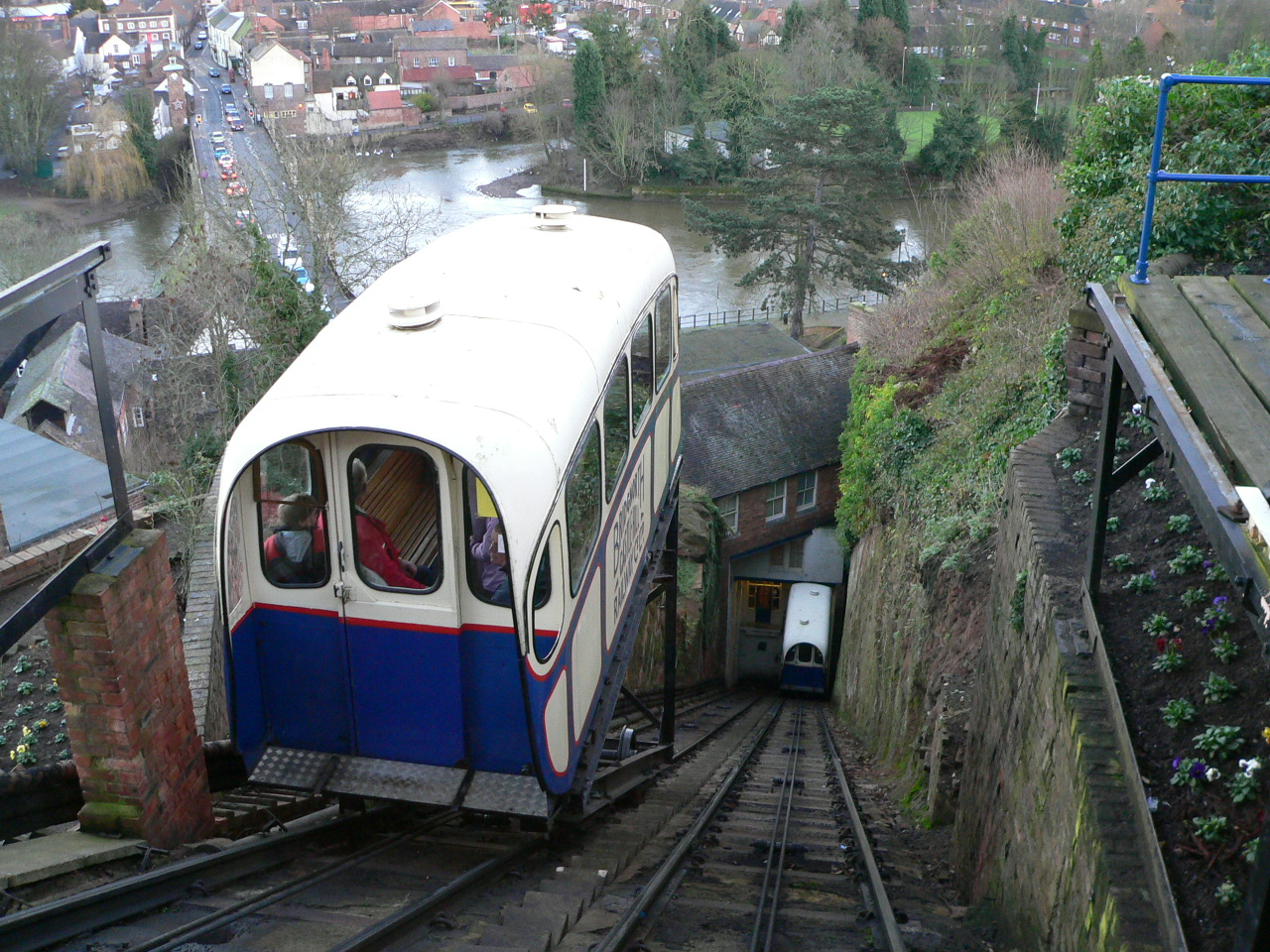
Bridgnorth's Castle Hill Railway

The Bridgnorth Cliff Railway, also known as the Bridgnorth Funicular Railway or Castle Hill Railway, is a funicular railway which has operated in Bridgnorth for over 100 years. The line links the lower part of High Town to the upper part. The bottom entrance is adjacent to the River Severn while the top is adjacent to the ruins of Bridgnorth Castle.

Opened on 7 July 1892 to great fanfare and the proclamation of a public holiday, the line is one of four funicular railways in the UK built to the same basic design - the others were the Clifton Rocks Railway in Bristol; the Lynton and Lynmouth Cliff Railway in Devon; and the Constitution Hill Railway in Aberystwyth, Wales.

It is one of the steepest railways in the country and at least one source (the information panel outside the top station) claims it is both the steepest and shortest. It is the only functional inland funicular railway in England - there are about 15 more at English seaside towns. Originally, the railway was powered by a simple system using water and gravity, but was converted in 1943–44 to run on electricity. Then, in 1955, new cars were installed on the railway; these were able to carry 18 passengers each and are still in use today. As of April 2024 return tickets cost £2.00 with discounts available for groups of 15 or more. Single tickets are not available.

The railway allows pedestrians to easily get between the High Town and Low Town as the only other ways between the two are via 200 steps, or by using roads which drastically increase the journey time and distance. The terminals at the upper and lower part of the railway are currently used as tea-rooms and guest houses.

The railway was temporarily closed in December 2022 due to damage to a retaining wall and further damage was discovered during repairs. The railway reopened on 4 March 2024.

=== Walking and cycling ===
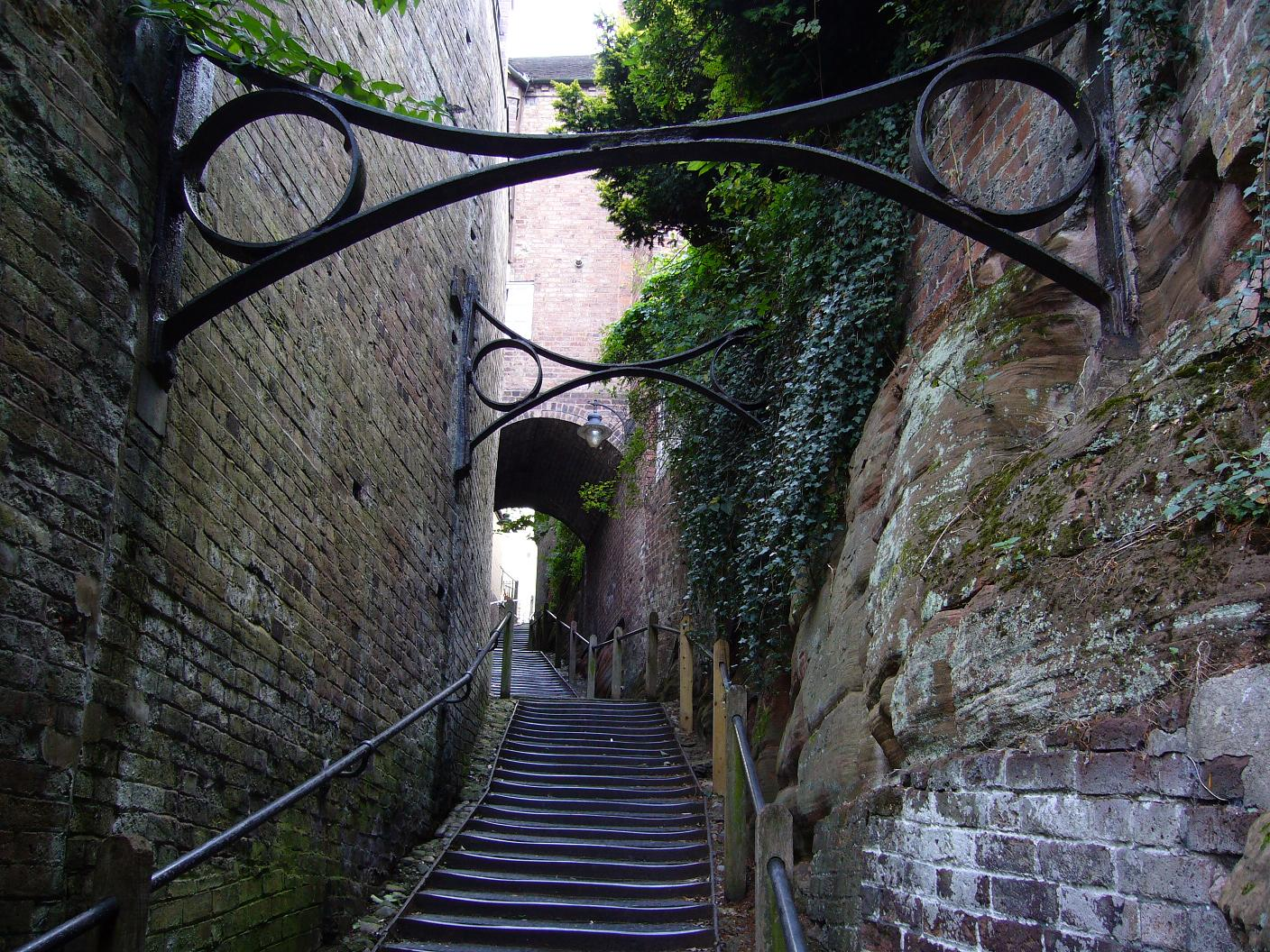
Stoneway Steps: one of the long flights of steps that lead up to High Town

Bridgnorth being split between High and Low Towns is connected by at least a dozen steps — for which the place is noted — from the north, going clockwise:

- innominate steps from Love Lane to Bramble Ridge
- Moat St Steps from St Leonard's Close to Moat Street
- Granary Steps from St Leonard's Close to Friars' Street
- St Leonard's Steps from St Leonard's Close to Cartway
- Friars Loade / Friary Steps from Friars' Street to Riverside
- Bank Steps from Cartway to Riverside
- Stoneway Steps from Waterloo Terrace to Underhill Street
- St Mary's Steps from East Castle Street to Underhill Street
- Library Steps from Castle Walk to Underhill Street
- Cannon Steps from Castle Walk to Hollybush Road
- Seven Sisters Steps from New Road to Hollybush Road
- Ebenezer Steps from New Road to Hollybush Road

The town is on National Route 45 of the Sustrans National Cycle Network, which is named the Mercian Way.

The long-distance trail called the Geopark Way begins in the town.

Every year since 1967, a sponsored walk has been held in Bridgnorth. Since 2017 this has been organised by the Bridgnorth Lions Club.

== Economy ==
On the eastern side of the town is a large aluminium works, founded in the 1950s.

=== Television manufacture ===
Automatic Telephone & Electric, part of Plessey, owned the Pale Meadow Works, on Hospital Street from 1950.

Decca Radio and Television took over former factory in October 1968. Decca Radar were taken over in early 1980. The site made colour televisions.

Tatung Company of Taiwan visited in early November 1980 who bought the site in June 1981. Tatung moved to a 40 acre site in Telford, in July 1985.

== Governance ==
The town council has sixteen members, with four elected from each of the four wards that cover the civil parish (named Castle, Morfe, East, and West). Castle ward includes Oldbury, while Morfe ward includes Danesford and Quatford.

Local government and services are otherwise provided by Shropshire Council and the town elects four of its members — one electoral division comprises East and Morfe wards together with Astley Abbotts, and the other comprises West and Castle wards together with Tasley. From 1974 until 2009, there was also Bridgnorth District Council, a tier of local government between the county and town councils.

== Notable residents ==
=== Active before 1900 ===
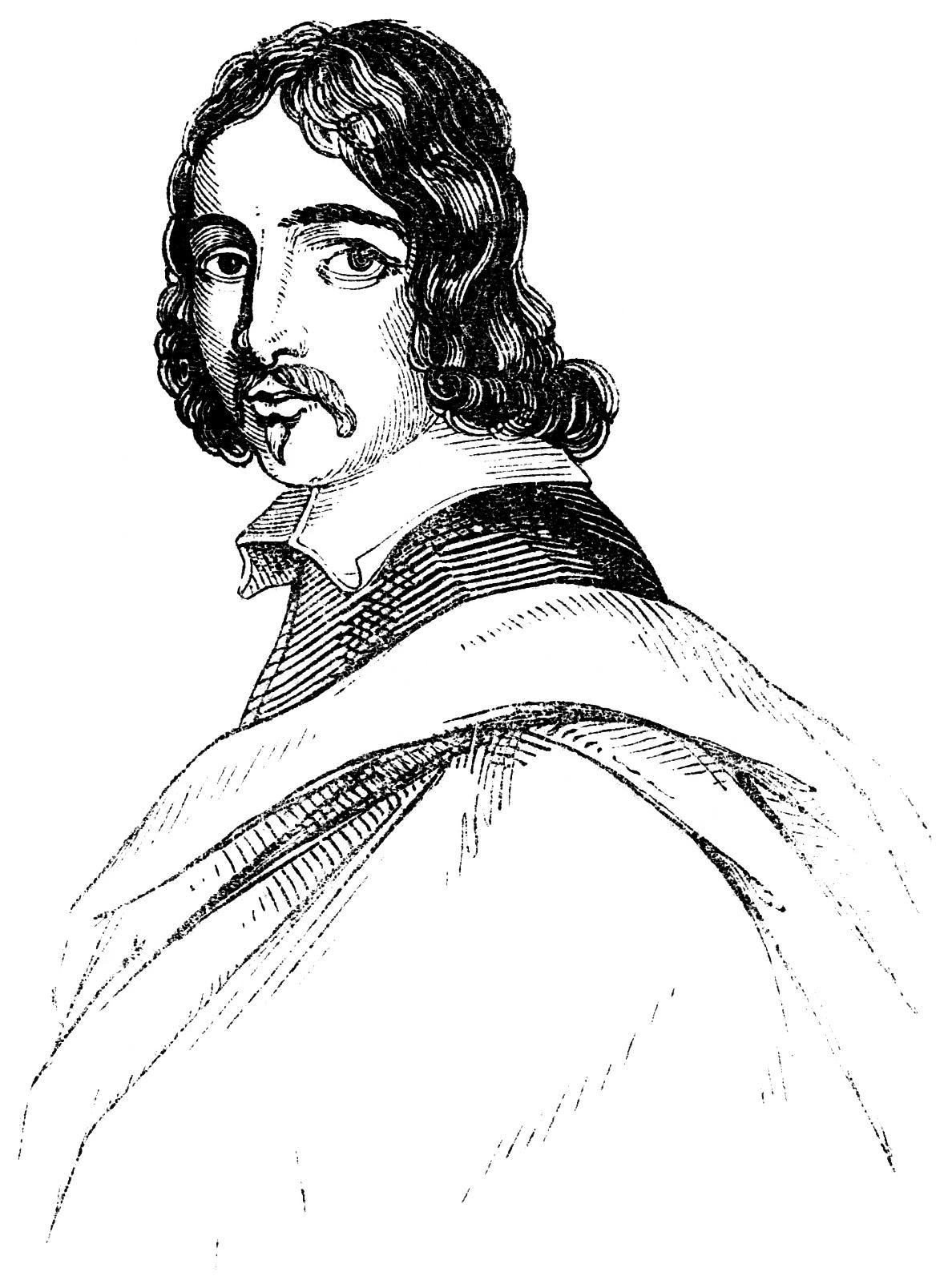
Francis Moore 1657-1715

- George Synge (1594–1652) Bishop of Cloyne from 1638 until his death in 1652.
- Richard Baxter (1615–1691) puritan divine, local minister called by Dean Stanley the chief of English Protestant Schoolmen
- Edward Synge (1621 in Bridgnorth-1678) Bishop of Cork, Cloyne and Ross in the Church of Ireland.
- Thomas Bray (1656/1658-1730), later founder of the USPG and SPCK, was initially a curate in Bridgnorth.
- Francis Moore (1657–1715) physician and astrologer, originator of Old Moore's Almanack.
- Elizabeth Jeffries (1727–1752) was an English woman executed for murder
- Thomas Percy (1729–1811) was Bishop of Dromore, County Down, Ireland
- Mary Martha Sherwood (1775-1851) children's author, lived at Bridgnorth between 1795 and her marriage in 1803, in a house in the High Street.
- William Macmichael (1783–1839) physician and medical biographer, author of The Gold-Headed Cane (1827)
- Samuel Bache (1804–1876) was an English Unitarian minister
- Henry Southwell (1860-1937) Church of England clergyman, later Bishop of Lewes 1920/1926, was from Bridgnorth, where his family lived at Woodlands Hall.

=== Active after 1900 ===
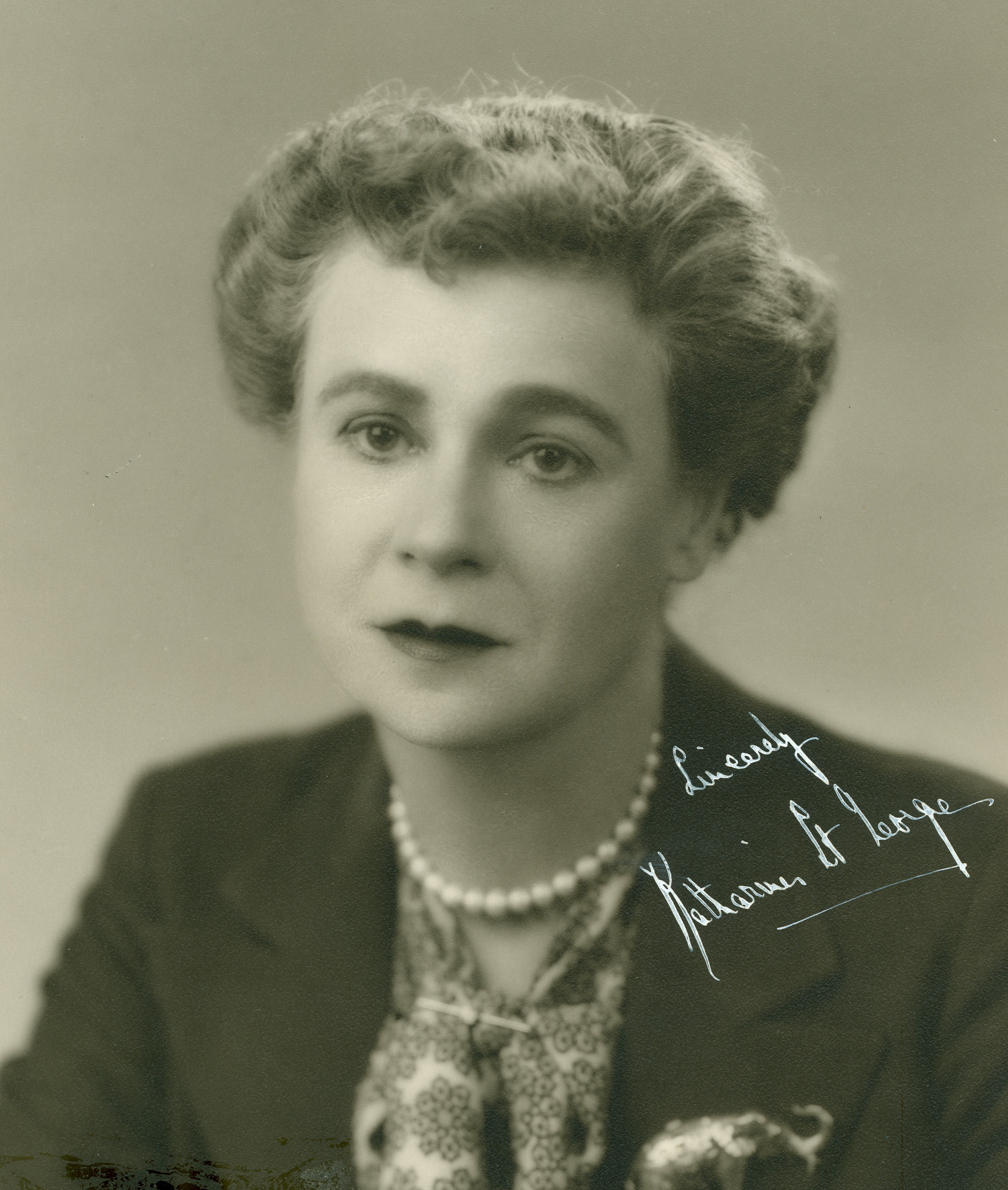
Katharine St. George

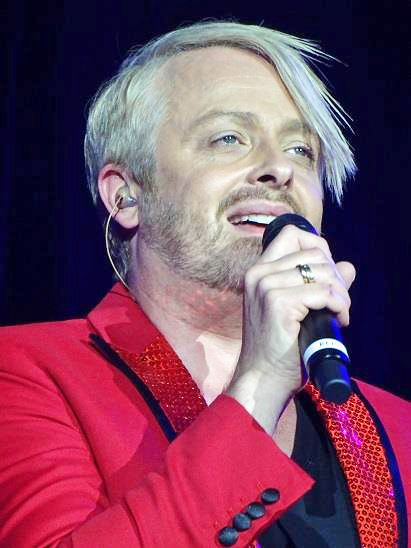
Ross Antony, 2016

- Henry Cope Colles (1879 in Bridgnorth-1943) music critic and lexicographer
- Sir Terence O'Connor (1891 in Bridgnorth – 1940) a Conservative Party politician, MP for Luton 1924/1929 and Nottingham Central 1930/1940 and Solicitor General 1936/1940
- John Dudley North (1893–1968) was chairman and managing director of Boulton Paul Aircraft, died locally
- Katharine St. George (1894 in Bridgnorth–1983) was a Republican member of the US House of Representatives and cousin of President Franklin Delano Roosevelt.
- Thomas Orde Lawder Wilkinson (1894 in Bridgnorth – 1916) Canadian and British Army officer, posthumously awarded the Victoria Cross
- Dilys Powell, (1901–1995) journalist and film critic who wrote for The Sunday Times for over 50 years,
- Cathcart Wight-Boycott (1910–1998) fighter pilot during WW2 and then a senior RAF officer.
- Peter Bullock (1937–2008) soil scientist, worked on soil morphology and land degradation.
- Michael Hooper (born 1941) Church of England clergyman (ultimately Bishop of Ludlow) was parish curate of St Mary Magdalene's in Bridgnorth 1965 to 1970.
- George Helon (born 1965) Freeman of the City of London, author, businessman and historian.
- Ross Antony (born 1974) musical actor, singer, TV entertainer in Germany.
- Dominic Sandbrook (born 1974) historian, author, columnist and TV presenter.

=== Sport ===
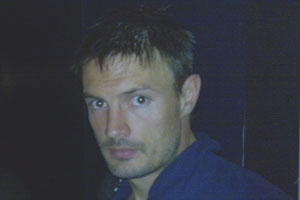
Ashley Westwood, 2009

- Richard Colley (1833-1902) first-class cricketer for Oxford University and county player for Oxfordshire and Shropshire, retired to Bridgnorth where he died.
- Aubrey Scriven (1904 in Highley – 1988) footballer who played 221 games, mainly for Bradford City A.F.C.
- Trevor Meredith (born 1936) footballer, 270 pro appearances, mainly for Shrewsbury Town.
- Ken Armstrong (1959-2022) former footballer, played about 170 games, injured, joined NHS Tayside.
- Steve Perks (1963– 2021) football goalkeeper, played 243 games for Shrewsbury Town F.C..
- David Preece (1963–2007) midfield footballer, played 585 games, mainly for Luton Town F.C..
- Gareth Mumford (born 1973) cricket wicket-keeper
- Craig Parnham (born 1973) field hockey defender and coach, played at the 2000 & 2004 Summer Olympics.
- Ashley Westwood (born 1976) former footballer and football manager; played 403 games mainly for Crewe Alex, Sheffield Wednesday F.C. and Wrexham F.C.

== Twin towns ==
Bridgnorth is twinned with:

- Thiers, Puy-de-Dôme, France
- Schrobenhausen, Germany
