= Richard Colley (cricketer) =

English cricketer

Personal information
- Full name: Richard Henry Colley
- Born: 14 January 1833; Westminster, Middlesex, England
- Died: 3 July 1902 (aged 69); Bridgnorth, Shropshire, England
- Batting: Unknown

Domestic team information
- Years: Team
- 1853–1855: Oxford University

Career statistics
Competition	First-class
Matches	7
Runs scored	166
Batting average	13.83
100s/50s	–/1
Top score	68
Catches/stumpings	1/–
- Source: Cricinfo, 5 February 2020

Richard Henry Colley JP (14 January 1833 – 3 July 1902) was an English first-class cricketer and British Army officer.

The son of Thomas Colley, he was born at Westminster in January 1833 and educated at Bridgnorth Grammar School in Shropshire. He matriculated at Christ Church, Oxford in 1851, graduating B.A. in 1855 and M.A. in 1859.

While studying at Oxford, he played first-class cricket for Oxford University. He made his debut against Cambridge University in The University Match of 1853, with Colley playing first-class cricket for Oxford until 1855, making a total of seven appearances. He scored a total of 166 runs in these matches, at an average of 13.83 and a high score of 68. He also played at county level for Oxfordshire and, between 1854 and 1866, for Shropshire. While playing for the latter he achieved a century in one match, when he made 118 runs.

After graduating from Oxford, Colley later served in the 1st Volunteer Battalion, Shropshire Light Infantry, enlisting as an ensign in May 1867. He was promoted to the rank of lieutenant in March 1871, with promotion to the rank of captain in August 1872. He was granted the honorary rank of major in May 1886, before retiring from active service in December 1892. Colley also served as a justice of the peace for the county of Shropshire. He married in 1869 Mary Emily Pass, with the marriage producing a daughter. Colley died at his home, St James' Priory, Bridgnorth in July 1902.
