= Catch Me Who Can =

Early British steam locomotive (1808)

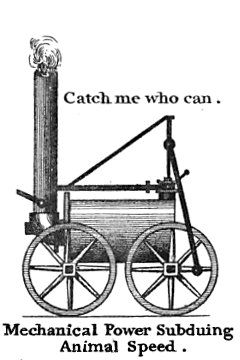
Drawing of the locomotive Catch Me Who Can, from a card or admission ticket to Trevithick's "Steam Circus", summer 1808

Catch Me Who Can was the fourth and last steam railway locomotive created by the inventor and mining engineer Richard Trevithick. It was an evolution of three earlier locomotives which had been built for Coalbrookdale, Penydarren ironworks and Wylam colliery. Demonstration runs began in July 1808, and Catch Me Who Can was the first locomotive in the world to haul fare-paying passengers.

Catch Me Who Can was constructed during 1808 by the engineers John Urpeth Rastrick and John Hazledine at their foundry in Bridgnorth, England. It was demonstrated to the public at Trevithick's "Steam Circus", a circular track in Bloomsbury, just south of the present-day Euston Square tube station, in London. Members of the public could pay to ride in carriages pulled by Catch Me Who Can around this track. During these demonstration runs, the locomotive reached a reported speed of between 12 miles per hour (19 km/h) and 15 miles per hour (24 km/h).

The circus closed following a derailment caused by one of the rails breaking underneath the locomotive. While the advantages and applications of steam locomotives had been demonstrated, the venture was a financial failure that played a significant part in Trevithick's bankruptcy in 1809.

== History ==
=== Design and construction ===
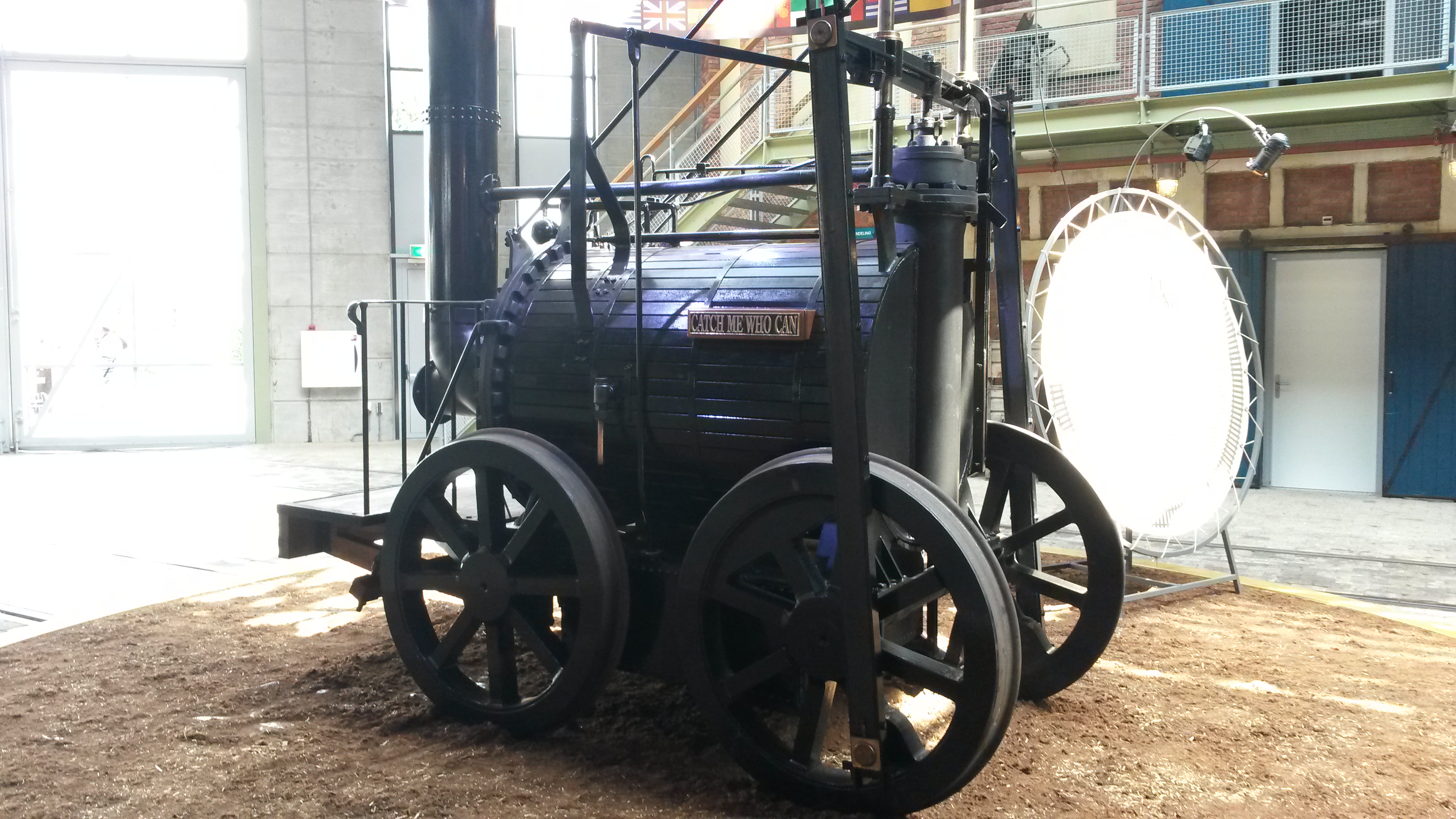
Replica of Catch Me Who Can during a 2014 exhibition in the Netherlands Railway Museum.

During the late 1700s and early 1800s, the inventor and mining engineer Richard Trevithick was the primary developer of the steam locomotive. He wanted to present his new invention to the general public, and he looked for a suitable site to demonstrate his invention. He chose Bloomsbury, directly south of the Euston Road, near London's Euston Square. The site is believed to be under University College London’s Chadwick Building, which now houses the Centre for Transport Studies. A circular track 100 feet (30 m) in diameter was built, on which a locomotive and a small number of carriages would run. Members of the public could view and ride on this train for a fare of 1 shilling. Trevithick hoped this would be a commercial venture, as well as creating publicity and hopefully demand for more locomotives.

Trevithick's fourth railway locomotive was built new for the Steam Circus. It was named Catch Me Who Can by the sister of Davies Gilbert. This new locomotive differed from the previous locomotive designs: instead of a horizontal cylinder, flywheel, and geared drive, Catch Me Who Can used a vertical cylinder encased in the boiler, driving one pair of wheels directly. The cylinder was 14.5 inches (37 cm) in diameter, with a 4 feet (1.2 m) stroke. The boiler was Trevithick's return-flue type, complete with an internal firebox. The locomotive was similar to an engine that Trevithick had built in 1803 to power a dredger for use on the Thames.

=== Operations ===
In spite of his goal of introducing steam locomotion to the public, Trevithick built a high wooden fence around the demonstration track, concealing it from view to all but those who paid to enter. This may have been done as a means of increasing revenue. Catch Me Who Can became the world’s first locomotive to haul fare-paying passengers.

Some claimed that performance of the locomotive was inferior to that of a horse over a 24 hour endurance test. Trevithick claimed that Catch Me Who Can could travel over 240 miles (390 km) in that time. The locomotive was reported to have reached a top speed of 12 miles per hour (19 km/h) on the circular track and Trevithick was of the opinion that it was capable of 20 miles per hour (32 km/h) on straight track.

Operation of Catch Me Who was hindered by the soft ground that the track was laid on. Trial runs began around 24 July 1808, but almost immediately the ground under the track sank, causing the iron rails to break as the 8-ton locomotive passed over them. Trevithick had the track taken up and timber baulks laid under it to provide a more stable footing. By 28 July, almost all the track had been relaid and the train ran again soon afterwards.

Within two months of its original opening, the locomotive again derailed. By then, fewer people were paying the shilling fare. Trevithick had spent all of his savings on setting up the Steam Circus, and he could not pay to have the railway fixed, and it closed.

After its use in London the locomotive may have been purchased by a Parisian for use as a pumping engine for his gold mining operation in Lima, Peru.

== Impact ==
In the long term, the Steam Circus was not a fruitless venture. Trevithick had become the first person to successfully prove that a steam locomotive on iron rails was feasible. It would be another 20 years before Trevithick’s concept was fully realised at the Rainhill Trials of 1829, at which the pioneering railway engineers George Stephenson and Robert Stephenson successfully demonstrated the potential of their locomotive "Rocket".

== Illustrations ==
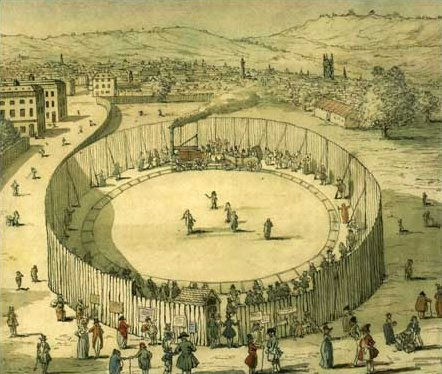
Contemporary (disputed) illustration of the steam circus in London, where Catch Me Who Can ran for just a few weeks.

In 2008, the curator of the National Museum of Science and Industry, John Liffen, announced that the most widely-known depiction of Catch Me Who Can and the Bloomsbury demonstration track, purportedly by Thomas Rowlandson (1757-1827), was likely a twentieth-century forgery. Other depictions based on this influential work were in turn misleading. There are few reliable illustrations of the locomotive. Even before this, the lack of reliable information about Catch Me Who Can had long been acknowledged.

== Replica ==
A replica is under construction by the Trevithick 200 charity at the Severn Valley Railway workshops, close to the site where the original locomotive was built. By July 2017 the braking mechanism was the only major item left to complete. The replica engine can usually be seen outside near to the entrance of the Severn Valley Railway at Bridgnorth station. From September 2025 it is on loan to the East Lancashire Railway at Bury Transport Museum.

== See also ==
- History of rail transport in Great Britain to 1830
