= Majestic Cinema, Bridgnorth =

Coordinates: 52.5357°N 2.4221°W

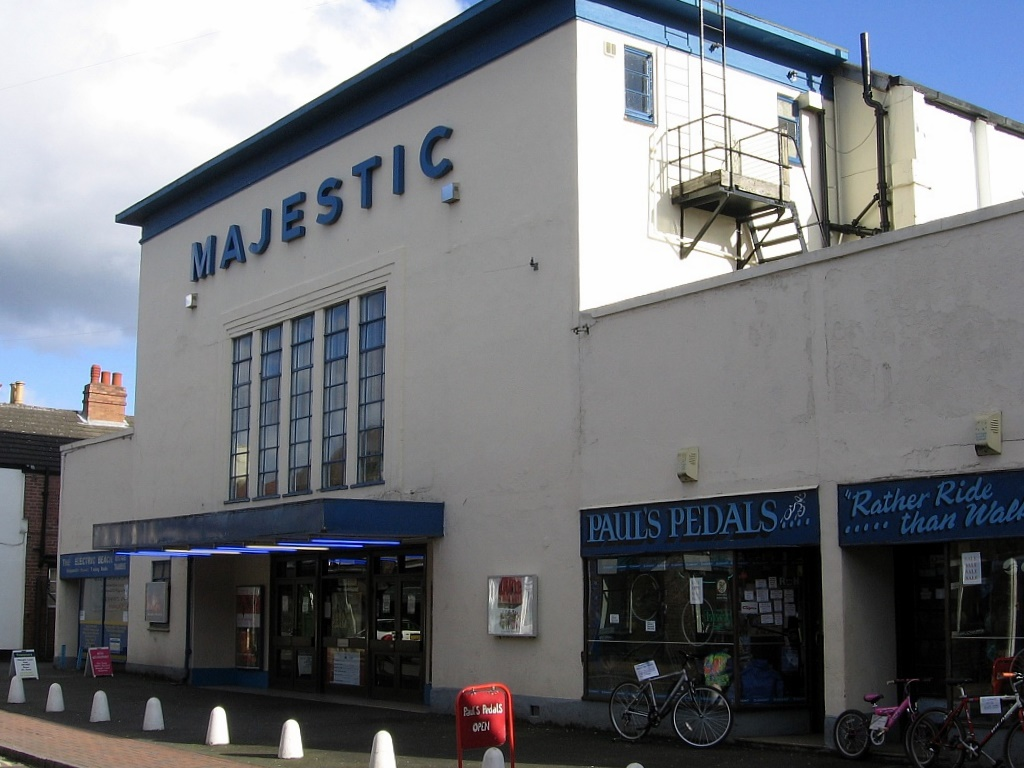
Majestic Cinema, Bridgnorth

The Majestic Cinema is the only working cinema in Bridgnorth, Shropshire, England. It opened in 1937, and has three screens, a large screen with around 330 seats and two small screens with around 80 seats. The upstairs screens previously made up a balcony when the cinema had only one screen. The cinema is now operated by the Reel Cinemas chain.
