= Gareth Mumford =

English cricketer

Personal information
- Full name: Gareth James Mumford
- Born: 18 June 1982 (age 44); Bridgnorth, Shropshire, England
- Batting: Right-handed
- Role: Wicket-keeper

Domestic team information
- Years: Team
- 2000–2002: Shropshire

Career statistics
| Competition | List A |
|---|---|
| Matches | 4 |
| Runs scored | 42 |
| Batting average | 21.00 |
| 100s/50s | –/– |
| Top score | 13* |
| Balls bowled | – |
| Wickets | – |
| Bowling average | – |
| 5 wickets in innings | – |
| 10 wickets in match | – |
| Best bowling | – |
| Catches/stumpings | 2/1 |
- Source: Cricinfo, 2 July 2011

Gareth James Mumford (born 18 June 1982) is a former English cricketer. Mumford is a right-handed batsman who fields as a wicket-keeper. He was born in Bridgnorth, Shropshire.

Mumford made his debut for Shropshire in the 2000 Minor Counties Championship against Wiltshire. Mumford played Minor counties cricket for Shropshire from 2000 to 2002, which included 8 Minor Counties Championship appearances and 7 MCCA Knockout Trophy appearances. He made his List A debut against Devon in the 2001 Cheltenham & Gloucester Trophy. He made 3 further List A appearances, the last of which came against Gloucestershire in the 2003 Cheltenham & Gloucester Trophy. In his 4 List A matches, he scored 42 runs at an average of 21.00, with a high score of 13 not out. Behind the stumps he took 2 catches and made a single stumping.
