= Mara G. Haseltine =

American artist and environmental activist

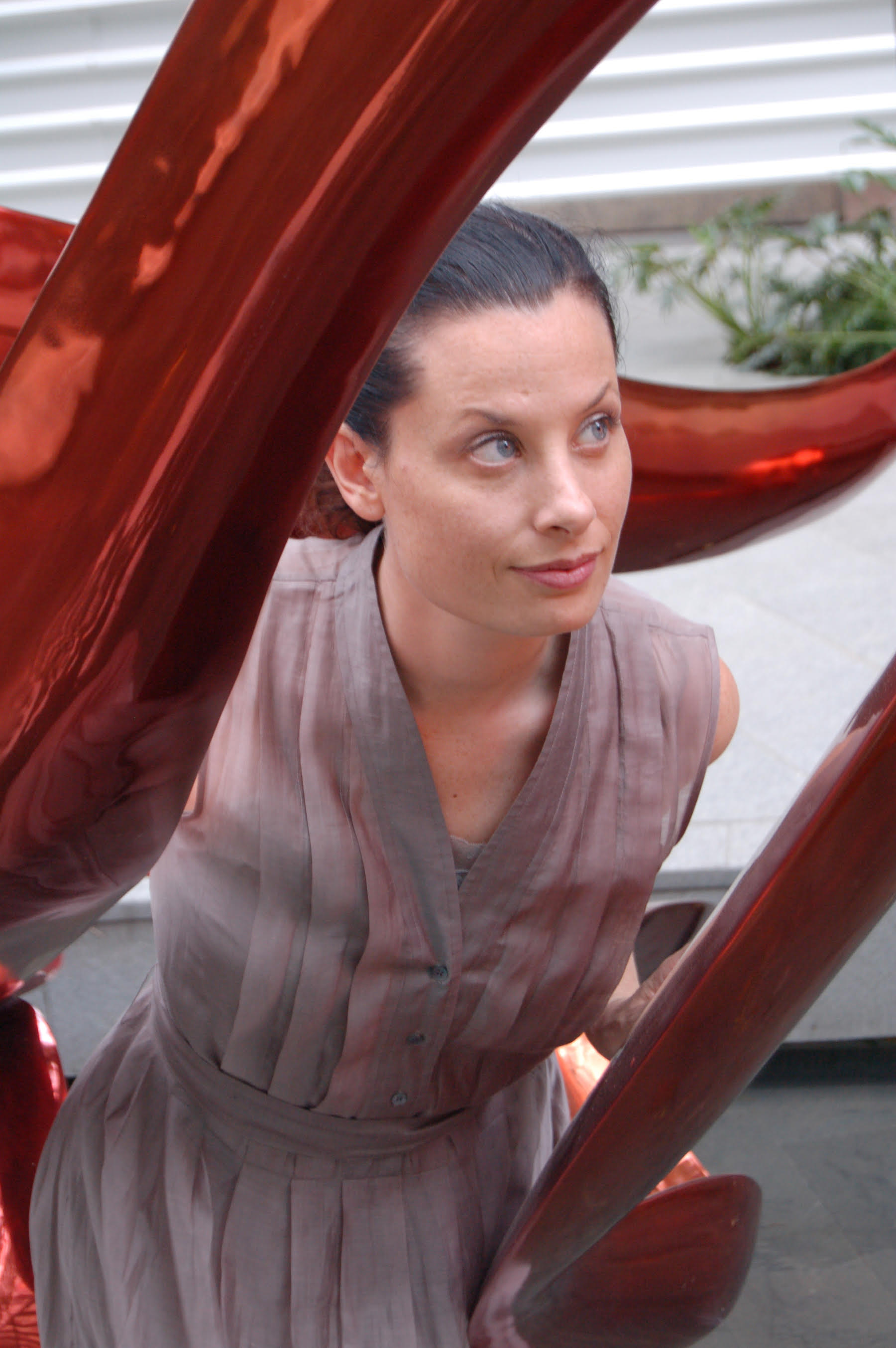
- Mara G. Haseltine inside her Sculpture SARS Inhibited Biopolis in Singapore, 2006
- Born: February 22, 1971 (age 55); Cambridge, Massachusetts
- Education: Oberlin College San Francisco Art Institute
- Notable work: Waltz of the Polypeptides, SARS inhibited, Homologous Hope, Transcriptease
- Movement: Sci-Art, Geotherapy, Environmental Art
- Awards: Scholarship Aspen Institute Leadership Program, 2012 Explorers, FLAG No. 75, 2011 Artist in Residency Imagine Science Films, 2012 Artist in Residency at Trinity College Dublin for Microscopy, 2011
- Website: http://www.calamara.com

Mara Gercik Haseltine (born 22 February 1971) is an American artist and environmental activist who has shown and worked internationally. She collaborates with scientists and engineers to create her work, which focuses on the link between human's shared cultural and biological evolution.

== Early life and family ==
Her father is an American geneticist Dr. William A. Haseltine, a professor of biochemistry at Harvard University.

== Career ==
Haseltine has worked internationally and collaborated with scientists and engineers to focus on the link between human's shared cultural and biological evolution.

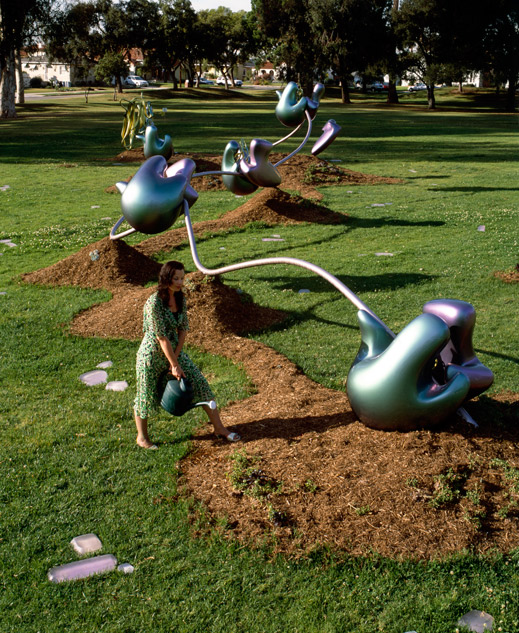
Waltz of the Polypeptides sculpture on the Cold Spring Harbor Laboratory campus in Long Island, New York

=== Artist ===
Haseltine worked for feminist French-American artist Niki de Saint Phalle and created mosaics in Normandy and France. She has built the 'Waltz of the Polypeptides,' 'SARS Inhibited.'

=== Environmental activist ===
She is the Art Director of Geotherapy Art Institute Associates.

== Recognition ==
Haseltine has featured in the film 'Invisible Ocean: Plankton & Plastic' to reveal a microscopic threat found beneath the ocean. She has been featured in the book 'Confronting Morality with Science and Art,' written by Pascale Pollier-Green.

.

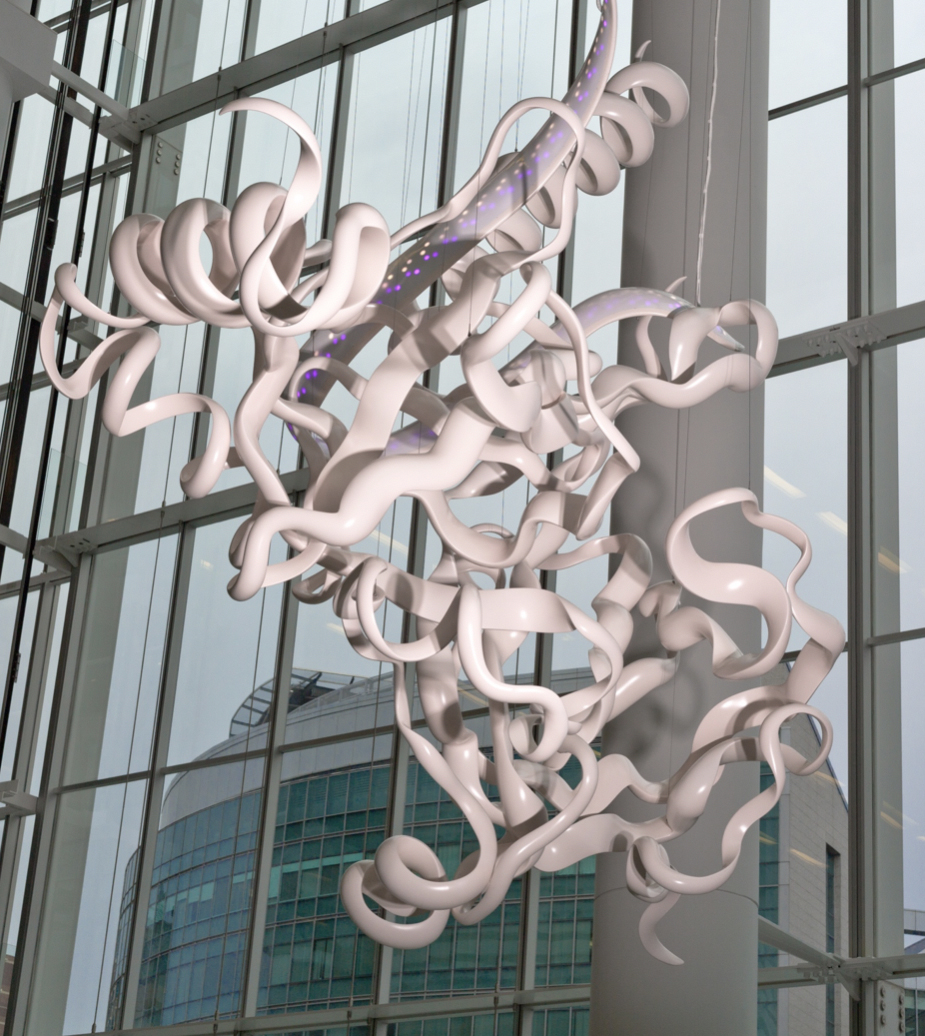
Homologous Hope sculpture in the UPenn Medical Basser Research Center for BRCA
