= Peter Heseltine =

English cricketer

Personal information
- Full name: Peter Anthony William Heseltine
- Born: 5 April 1965 (age 61); Barnsley, Yorkshire, England
- Batting: Right-handed
- Bowling: Right-arm off break
- Relatives: Phillip Heseltine (brother)

Domestic team information
- Years: Team
- 1991: Durham
- 1987–1988: Sussex

Career statistics
Competition	First-class	List A
Matches	20	4
Runs scored	186	11
Batting average	10.94	–
100s/50s	–/–	–/–
Top score	26	6*
Balls bowled	2,066	132
Wickets	22	5
Bowling average	48.59	18.20
5 wickets in innings	–	–
10 wickets in match	–	–
Best bowling	3/33	2/12
Catches/stumpings	3/–	1/–
- Source: Cricinfo, 1 January 2012

Peter Anthony William Heseltine (born 5 April 1965) is a former English cricketer. Heseltine was a right-handed batsman who bowled right-arm off break. He was born at Barnsley, Yorkshire.

Heseltine made his first-class debut for Sussex against the touring Pakistanis in 1987. He made nineteen further first-class appearances for the county, the last of which came against Surrey in the 1988 County Championship. In his twenty first-class appearances, he took 22 wickets at an average of 48.59, with best figures of 3/33. With the bat, he scored a total of 186 runs at a batting average of 10.94, with a high score of 26. He made three List A appearances for Sussex during the course of the 1987 season, twice against Surrey and once against Northamptonshire. He took four wickets in his three List A matches for the county, which came at an average of 13.50, with best figures of 2/12. He left Sussex at the end of the 1988 season.

He later joined Durham in 1991, playing a single List A match against Glamorgan in the NatWest Trophy, in which he took the wicket of Ravi Shastri, to finish with figures of 1/37 from 12 overs in Glamorgan's total of 345/2. In Durham's innings of 305/9, he ended the innings unbeaten on 5 runs, with Glamorgan winning by 40 runs. He also played a single Minor Counties Championship match that season against Staffordshire. Durham gained first-class status and were admitted to the County Championship for the 1992 season, though Heseltine wasn't retained by Durham.

His brother, Phillip, has also played first-class cricket.
