= S. R. Heseltine =

Samuel Richard Heseltine (c. 1849 – 19 December 1920) was a riverboat captain, businessman, and a longtime secretary of the Adelaide Racing Club.

== History ==
Emily Rose Haussen ( – 1887) arrived with her parents Otto Carl Haussen and his wife Maria Haussen aboard John, arriving February 1840. George Augustus Frederick Heseltine ( – 1904) arrived from London aboard Taglioni in June 1844. They married 7 May 1846.

G. A. F. Heseltine and his brother John Heseltine (died at Sevenoaks, Kent 5 February 1885) were sons of Samuel Richard Heseltine II (1786 – 1861) of the London Stock Exchange.

Heseltine was born in Adelaide, and educated at J. L. Young's Adelaide Educational Institution. He moved to Milang where he became involved in the River Murray steamboat trade. He was owner of Menindie and Shannon in partnership with W. L. Reid, and captained Prince Alfred in 1875; Menindie in 1875, 1876, and 1879; and Shannon 1880–1882 and 1886. His brothers John and Gus worked on the same boats. Gus (Augustus Frederick Heseltine) fell from Menindie and was drowned near Overland Corner on 26 April 1879.

Later he entered the wine and spirit business of Reid, Jay & Co, later becoming Reid & Heseltine. In 1889 the Licensed Victuallers Racing Club, which at that time raced at Victoria Park, became the Adelaide Racing Club and in February 1891 Heseltine was appointed to the committee. In 1893 he retired from business to become secretary of the club, a position he held from July 1893 until his death. He took his responsibilities very seriously, and was closely associated for 16 years with the club chairman W. B. Carr. The prime motivation for these two leaders was always for the welfare of the club, and were largely responsible for its high reputation with the public.

He was a reliable, honorable, loyal and trustworthy servant of the club, and was in every way qualified to discharge the duties of a racing secretary. He did not court popularity, and did not seek publicity.

Heseltine died at his home on Robe Terrace, Medindie, several months after being struck by a tram. He was succeeded as club secretary by Hiram Wentworth Varley (died 1927), then in 1927 by his son, also named Samuel Richard Heseltine.

== Family ==
G. A. F. Heseltine (c. 1819 – 23 March 1904) married Emily Rose Haussen (c. 1829 – 27 June 1887) in 1846

- Martha Langam Heseltine (1847– )
- Samuel Richard Heseltine (1849 – 19 December 1920) married Mary Jane Hillier (c. 1853 – 31 May 1933) in 1874

- Dr. Verner George Heseltine (1876 – ) practising in US
- Samuel Richard Heseltine (6 April 1878 – 1960) married Ruby Susannah Clayton in 1908. Born in Melbourne, he was educated at St. Peter's College, became a lawyer and footballer with North Adelaide (18 games seasons 1900–1901, 1903–1904); succeeded his father as secretary of the Adelaide Racing Club.
- Augustus Frederick Heseltine (25 October 1881 – ) principal of Port Pirie Technical School; Ballarat School of Mines in 1923

- George Nyron Heseltine (1851 – 1924) married Mary Jane (died 1881) He married again to Elizabeth Rachel Bertwistle (c. 1869 – 4 January 1921) on 1 June 1903. He was employee of South Australian Railways.
- Augustus Frederick "Gus" Heseltine (c. 1854 – 26 April 1879), worked on brother's riverboat, fell from Menindie and was drowned near Overland Corner
- John Charles Heseltine (1858 – 1 December 1935), captain of Shannon 1880–1885 (when she was destroyed by fire), then a wine and spirit merchant, never married, died after his car collided with a tram.
- Violet Annie Heseltine (1861 – 3 October 1940) married draftsman Walter Ferdinand Gardiner (died 29 December 1941) on 1 November 1890, lived at Osmond Terrace, Norwood.
