= William C. Hazledine =

American politician (1833–1892)

William C. Hazledine (May 18, 1833 – January 2, 1892) was an American lawyer, politician and judge.

== Biography ==
Born May 18, 1833, in Arkansas, Hazledine served on the Pulaski Chancery Court. Moving to New Mexico in 1875k he advocated for New Mexico's statehood. He also served as president of the New Mexico Bar Association in 1891. He died on January 2, 1892, aged 58, in Albuquerque.
