= Execution of Elizabeth Jeffries and John Swan =

1752 double execution at Walthamstow, England

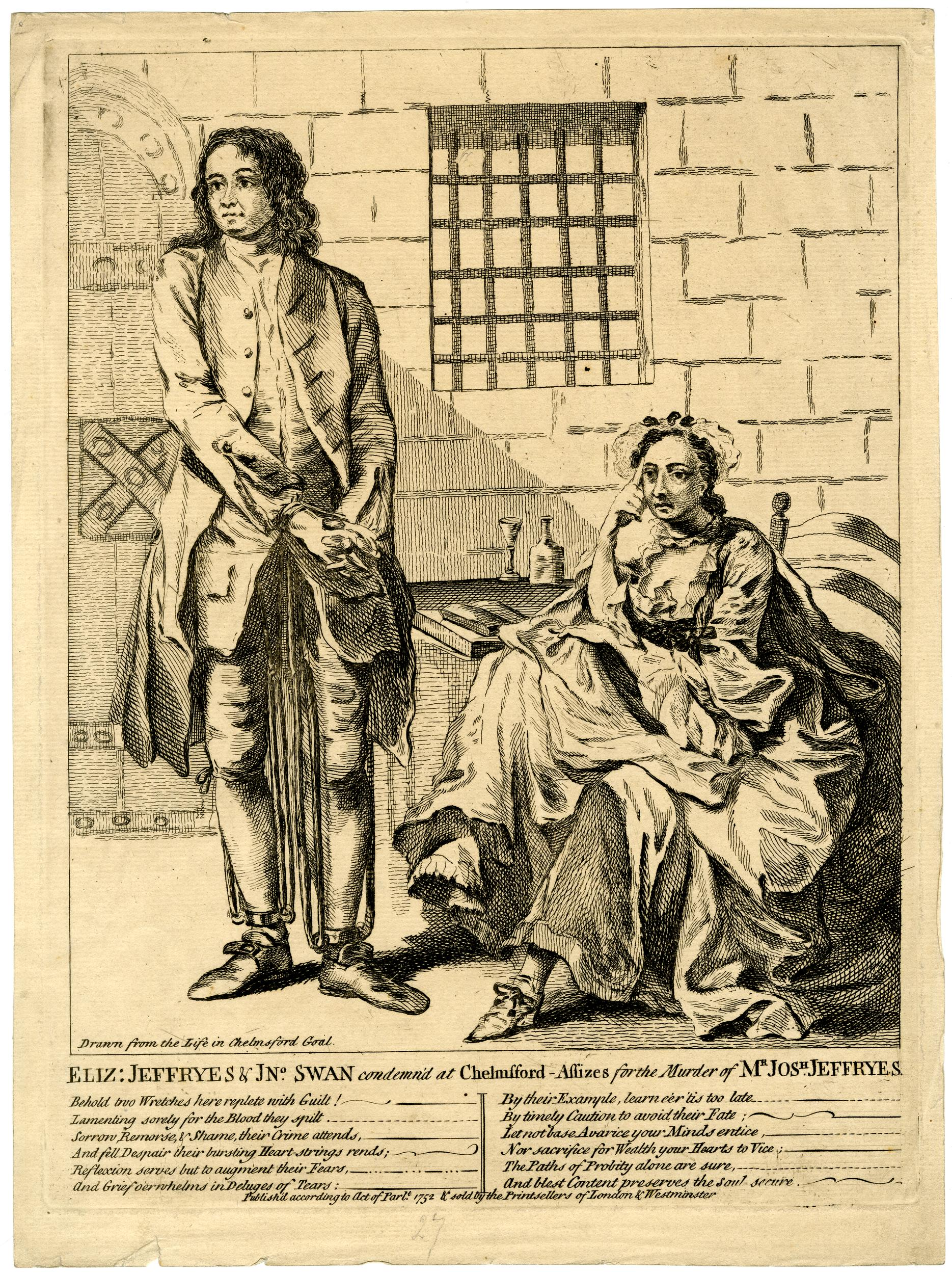
1752 etching and engraving of John Swan and Elizabeth Jeffries in their cell at Chelmsford prison

The execution of Elizabeth Jeffries and John Swan took place on 28 March 1752 at Epping Forest, on a hill overlooking Walthamstow. They had both been sentenced to death on 9 March, with Swan found guilty of petty treason and Jeffries of murder, both for the same crime of killing Jeffries' uncle, who had threatened to revoke her inheritance of his estate after she had become his mistress. The execution is notable for dubious records of Jeffries's in-depth written correspondence with similar murderer Mary Blandy while in jail, the sensationalism surrounding the conviction and execution, and the fact that Swan was hung in chains after death.

== Murder ==
Elizabeth Jeffries had been taken care of by her uncle since childhood, but later became a mistress to him. He had promised her that she would inherit his valuable estate. However, her uncle later threatened to change his mind and deprive her of this estate, which motivated the murder. Jeffries and her accomplice, John Swan, made the decision to kill Jeffries' uncle, shooting him dead.

== Sentencing ==
Swan and Jeffries were convicted of the murder in 1752. The trial was well-reported. Jeffries's and Swan's trial took place just prior to the Murder Act 1751 coming into force. The Attorney General received orders from the government to prosecute the pair, and though counsel were present on both sides, the bench did most of the witness questioning. Swan was found guilty of petty treason, and Jeffries of murder, on 9 March 1752. They were sentenced to hang on a hill overlooking Walthamstow on the edge of Epping Forest; assize judge Sir Martin Wright appears to have made this decision after being lobbied by several local gentlemen.

== Execution ==
Swan and Jeffries's executions took place on 28 March 1752. Both Swan and Jeffries were carted and sledged to Walthamstow, for which the county of Essex was charged a bill of £56; Swan's petty treason included the requirement that he be pulled on a rough wooden sledge by six horses the whole way. Jefferies was moved in an open cart, seated on an upright chair beside her coffin and her nurse, who read her some consoling literature. One account notes that "All the way from Chelmsford to the Gibbet the road was covered; the hedges and the trees by the roadside were filled with spectators as were the windows and houses all along the road." Over the course of the journey, Jefferies hid her face with her gown's hood. Swan similarly wore his hat "flapped, so no person could see his face till he came to the gallows." The 32-mile procession moved for 9 hours "in slow and solemn pomp" from Chelmsford through Ingatestone, Brentford, Romford and Ilford to the hill above Walthamstow. The undersheriff stated that the slow speed of the procession was to ensure that the pair "be made as public example as possible".

Upon arrival, Swan was pinioned and placed in leg irons, but was able to read a prayer book. Jefferies, meanwhile, "fell into a fit and was in great agonies, declaring, when she came to herself, that she did not mind dying but thought it was cruel to carry her so far exposed". While she was ordered to take off her hood as the procession arrived, she instead tied two handkerchiefs around her head. Commentary at the time wrote of the unprecedented size of the crowd, with one account describing that "There never was perhaps so great a number of people assembled together on both horse and foot upon any occasion whatever". They were then hanged.

=== Post-execution ===
Only Swan was to be hung in chains, and this was initially to take place at the location of his hanging, at Ten Mile stone in Epping Forest. However, Wright indicated that this location would not be suitable as it was "in full view of some Gentlemen’s houses on the Forest", stating that it should be "left to the Gentlemen of Walthamstow to consult with the under-sheriff, and fix a proper place to erect a gibbet on". Eventually, it was decided that Buckets Hill, near the Bald Faced Stag inn would be a suitable site as it was associated with Swan. He was thus gibbeted 6 miles from the site of his execution, on 30 March 1752. However, gentlemen from the area complained, and so the body was moved to Hagen Lane in Walthamstow, near the site of the murder. The total execution expenses came to £52.

Jeffries’s fate following her execution is unclear, though she was likely not subject to the gibbet nor the scalpel. The Authentick Memoirs of the Wicked Life and Transactions of Elizabeth Jeffryes and the London Evening Post, both of 1752, stated that that her body was taken away by her friends.

== Responses ==
A 1752 pamphlet remarked that Jeffries's uncle had his comeuppance for his sexual abuse of her, and that she also got what she deserved as she had been the instrument of vengeance in the affair. The Newgate Calendar, however, simply remarked that "she returned her uncle's kindness with ingratitude." Jeffries was largely portrayed in contemporary media as promiscuous and wicked.

The procession and subsequent hanging was reported and discussed in an elaborate two-foot wide, hand-coloured and competitively priced print commissioned by London publisher Bispham Dickenson; this was unusual for a provincial execution. The publisher advertised its intention "to gratify the public’s curiosity" with the print, and stated that it "did engage and send down an ingenious artist to draw, on the spot, an accurate perspective view of the procession". A doggerel verse appended to the print reads in part:

But see what crouds are gather’d round
From ev’ry village, farm and town
Before, behind, on ev’ry side
The people walk or run or ride.

Some clamber up the trees that there
Their eyes may have a boundless stare
Eager to see the mournful scene
Tho’ sorrow covers ev’ry mein
Compassion’s felt in ev’ry breast
And yet it is by all confess’d
Their crime deserves their doom severe...

The Covent-Garden Journal noted that "The Executioner behaved very unskilfully", and that this executioner was "said [...] to be one who had never practised the trade before".

=== Genuine Letters that Pass'd between Miss Blandy and Miss Jeffries ===
In April 1752, another pamphlet entitled Genuine Letters that Pass'd between Miss Blandy and Miss Jeffries, Before and After Conviction was published, detailing the prison letter correspondence between Jeffries and Blandy. Jeffries was held in Chelmsford jail, during which time she apparently had frequent written correspondence with Mary Blandy, who had been charged with murdering her father, over the course of three months. The nature of these letters as genuine is open to question as letter-writing between women as well as between prisoners was extremely unusual, and because other records show Blandy and Jeffries to be highly dissimilar in character, with no other sources by them purporting their friendship. This alleged correspondence took place before and after Jeffries's conviction, and was published after their respective executions.

In the letters, Blandy remarked that Jeffries's case was "so much like my own," and as such expressed a desire that they "may correspond, and mutually comfort and support one another." Jeffries wrote back that "I never till now experienced what it was to have a Friend to unburthen one’s Mind to". They told each other of their life stories and their crimes, and discussed their choices of books, servants and gardener. The pair imaginatively wrote of when they may be set free. Jeffries wrote of "the Happiness I shall enjoy in the Company and Conversation of a Person I have so great a Value for." She named the fantasy of when they would live together as "my Paradise". Blandy planned how they may live together after release, writing:

I have a delightful Spot in my Eye, far from any Road or Bustle, which if you approve of, we will bid adieu to the World, and retire to, where with a well chosen Library, and a few select Friends, we may wear away an easy, innocent and agreeable Life here, and with less Interruption prepare for a better hereafter.

In the correspondence, this "paradise" was dashed when Blandy was convicted of her murder and following this Jeffries confessed to Blandy that she had murdered her uncle.
