= Hazeltine =

Hazeltine may refer to:

== People ==
- Abner Hazeltine (1793–1879), American politician
- Alice Isabel Hazeltine (1878–1959), American librarian, editor, and writer
- David Hazeltine (born 1958), American jazz pianist, composer, arranger and educator
- Deliverance Dane (died 1735), née Hazeltine, convicted in the Salem Witch Trials
- Harold Dexter Hazeltine (1871–1960), American legal scholar
- Mary E. Hazeltine (1868–1949), American librarian
- Matt Hazeltine (1933–1987), American football player
- Ira S. Haseltine (sometimes spelled Hazeltine) (1821–1899), American politician
- Louis Alan Hazeltine (1886–1964), American engineer and physicist, developer of the Neutrodyne receiver
- Martin Mason Hazeltine (1827–1903), American photographer

== Other uses ==
- Hazeltine Corporation, the company which marketed the Neutrodyne and other electronic equipment
- Hazeltine Lake, Minnesota
- Hazeltine National Golf Club, Chaska, Minnesota
- Hazeltine Park, Portland, Oregon

== See also ==
- Hazeldine (disambiguation)
- Heseltine
