= Hazeldean =

Hazeldean may refer to:

- Hazeldean, Edmonton, Alberta, Canada
- Hazeldean, New Brunswick, Canada
- Hazeldean, Queensland, Australia
- Katimavik-Hazeldean, Ottawa, Canada

== See also ==
- Hazell Dean, British pop singer
- Jock O'Hazeldean, ballad
