= Church of St Mary Magdalene, Bridgnorth =

Church in Shropshire, England

Coordinates: 52°31′57″N 2°25′7″W

St. Mary Magdalene, Bridgnorth
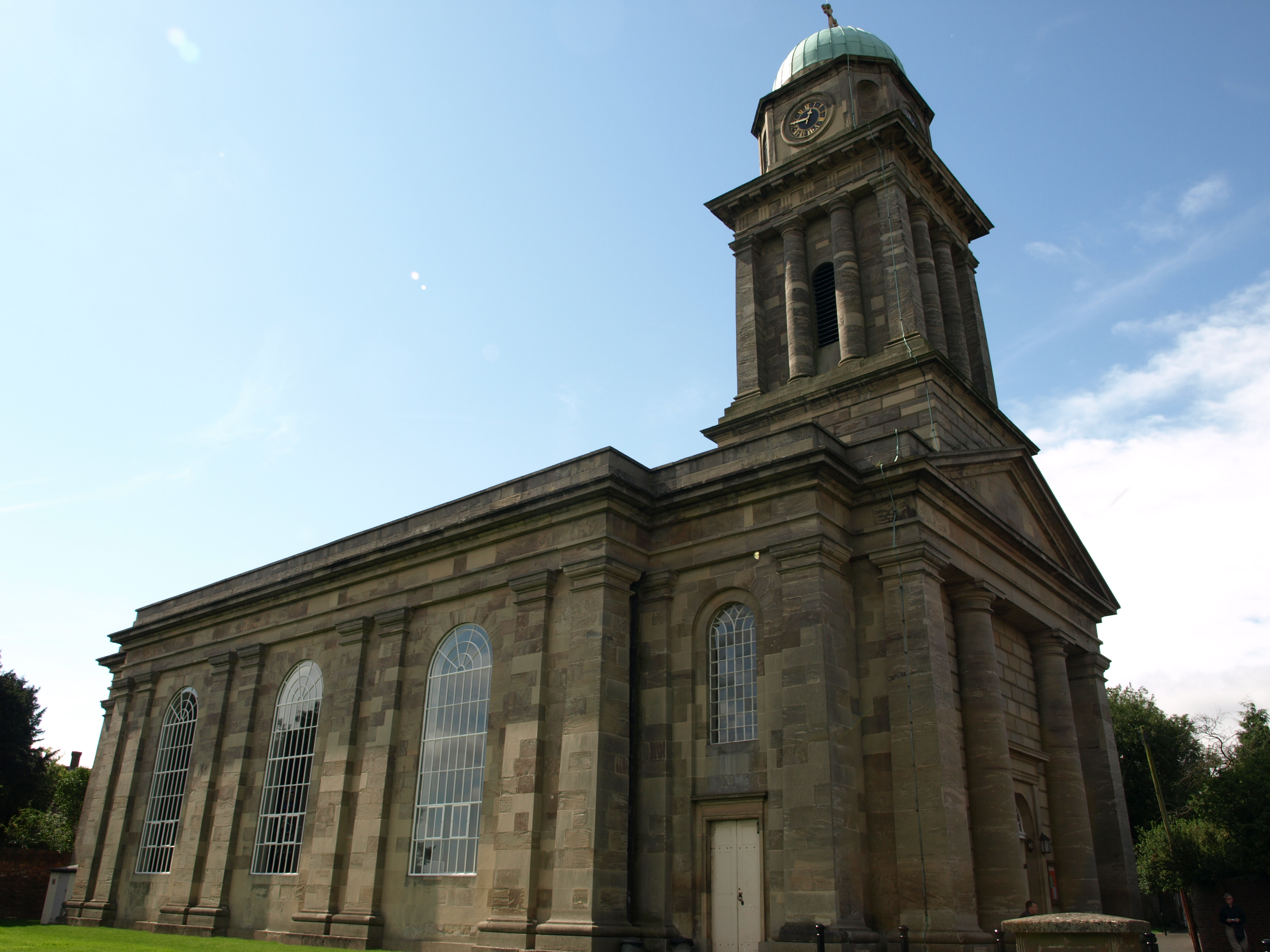
- St. Mary Magdalene, Bridgnorth
- St. Mary Magdalene, Bridgnorth
- Denomination: Church of England
- Churchmanship: Choral
- Website: www.bridgnorthteamministry.org.uk

History
- Dedication: St. Mary Magdalene

Administration
- Province: Canterbury
- Diocese: Hereford
- Archdeaconry: Ludlow
- Deanery: Bridgnorth
- Parish: Bridgnorth

Clergy
- Rector: Rev Prebendary Simon Cawdell
- Vicar: Rev Sarah Cawdell

The Church of St. Mary Magdalene, Bridgnorth, is a parish Church in the Church of England, standing in East Castle Street, Bridgnorth, Shropshire, England. It is a grade II* listed building.

== Early history ==
The College of St. Mary Magdalen, Bridgnorth was founded as a royal free chapel, and its church was in the royal castle at Bridgnorth.

The nave, chancel and western tower were probably built c. 1238, and a north aisle was added, presumably after 1294, when a chantry service was founded in St. Mary's by Richard Dammas. As a Collegiate church it was originally intended as a private chapel for the castle, but by the later 15th century it was being used as a parish church.

The college of canons was dissolved in 1548.

=== The Deans of Bridgnorth ===
- Alexander c. 1161
- Simon c. 1196.
- Hugh de Taunay 1214
- Peter of Rivaulx 1223
- Michael de Fienles 1262
- Stephen of London 1265
- Bonettus of St. Quentin 1268
- Walter Langton 1290
- Amadeus of Savoy 1298
- William of Savoy 1300
- Peter of Savoy 1301
- Engelard of Warley 1308
- Thomas of Eyton alias Knockin 1318
- Thomas Talbot 1334
- Thomas Keynes 1353
- Robert Ive 1362
- Thomas of Brantingham 1369
- Roger of Otery 1370
- Nicholas Slake 1387
- Thomas of Tutbury 1391
- Columba de Dunbar 1403
- John Marshall 1410
- Henry Sever ca. 1446
- William Dudley 1471
- Richard Martin 1476
- William Chantry 1482
- John Argentine 1485
- Thomas Larke 1508
- William Cooper 1515
- Thomas Magnus 1517

== The current building ==
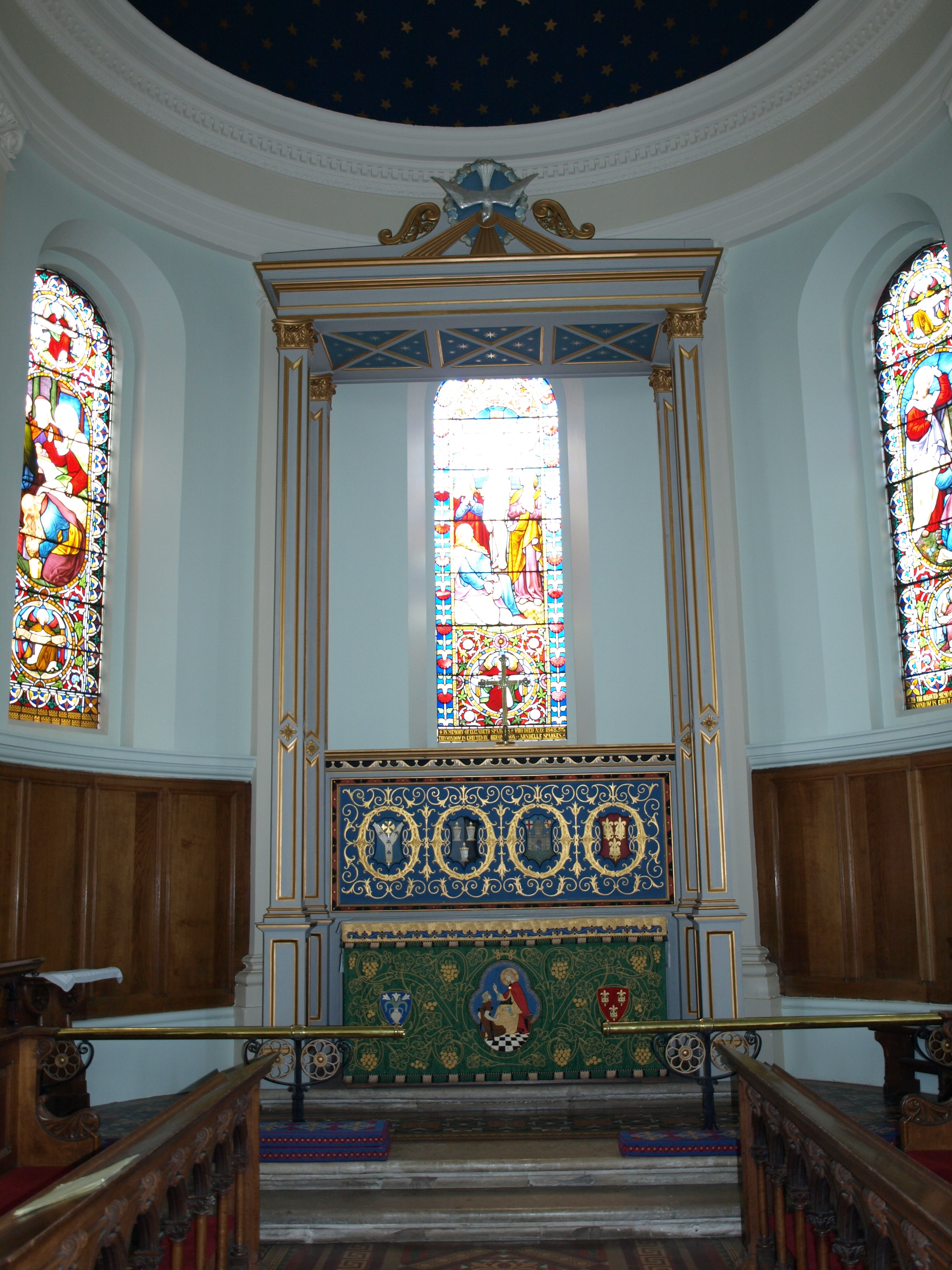
The chancel

The church was designed by Thomas Telford and built by John Rhodes and Michael Head between 1792 and 1795.

The church is aligned north–south, rather than the more usual west–east. The tower stands 120 ft high, and it has a clock, eight bells and a copper-covered roof.

The parish's war memorial is a wooden triptych with a crucifix in the centre, above the Latin mottos "AMOR VINCIT" (Love conquers) and the town motto, "FIDELITAS URBIS SALUS REGIS" (In the town's loyalty lies the safety of the King) and listing its war dead from both World Wars.

== Organ ==
The church has a magnificent Father Willis organ, purchased from Clifton College, Bristol.

== Organists ==
- William Roberts (Professor of Music and Organist) 1851-1872.
- Arthur C Clarke 1939 - 1972
- Harold Cooper 1972 - 2002.
- John Turnock

== Bells ==
The church has 8 bells, the heaviest weighing just over 8 cwt. These are usually rung twice weekly: on Wednesday practice night (7:30 pm – 9:00 pm) and for the main service on a Sunday morning (10:00 am – 10:30 am). Additionally, they are sometimes rung for weddings.

== Sources ==
- The buildings of England, Shropshire. Nikolaus Pevsner.
- Civil Engineering Heritage, by Roger Cragg
- Colleges of secular canons: Bridgnorth, St Mary Magdalen, A History of the County of Shropshire: Volume 2 (1973), pp. 123–128.
