= Haseltonia =

Haseltonia may refer to:

- Haseltonia, a synonym of Cephalocereus, a genus of cacti
- Haseltonia, the technical yearbook of the Cactus and Succulent Society of America
