= RAF Bridgnorth =

Former Royal Air Force base in Shropshire, England

- Near Bridgnorth, Shropshire in England
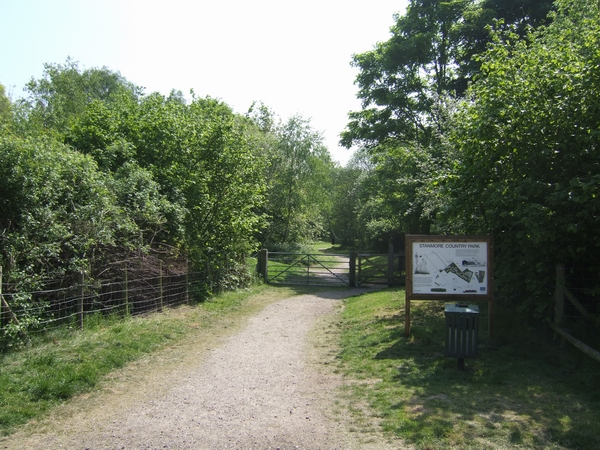
- Site of RAF Bridgnorth

Site information
- Type: Royal Air Force station - Recruit training station

Location
- Shown within Shropshire
- Coordinates: 52°32′01.6″N 2°22′48.1″W

Site history
- Built: 1939
- In use: 1939-1963

Royal Air Force Bridgnorth or more simply RAF Bridgnorth is a former Royal Air Force station, created after the outbreak of the Second World War on 6 November 1939, at Stanmore, to the east of Bridgnorth, Shropshire, England. However, as RAF Stanmore Park already existed in Middlesex, it was named RAF Bridgnorth. Although during its existence various static aeroplanes were displayed as gate guardians, RAF Bridgnorth never had a runway.

The first unit stationed there was No. 4 Recruit Centre. Their role was to carry out the basic training of new recruits in the RAF, originally designed for 2,000 recruits and 500 permanent staff. In 1940 spare accommodation at Bridgnorth enabled it to be used as a transit and kitting out centre for troops returning from France. In August 1941 the Station was renamed No. 1 Women's Auxiliary Air Force Depot involved with the training of WAAF recruits. By September 1942 saw another change of name to the No. 1 Elementary Air Navigation School. Other changes subsequently took place as dictated by the needs of the war effort. From its inception until after the war, the station also had a 114-bed hospital.

== Second World War ==
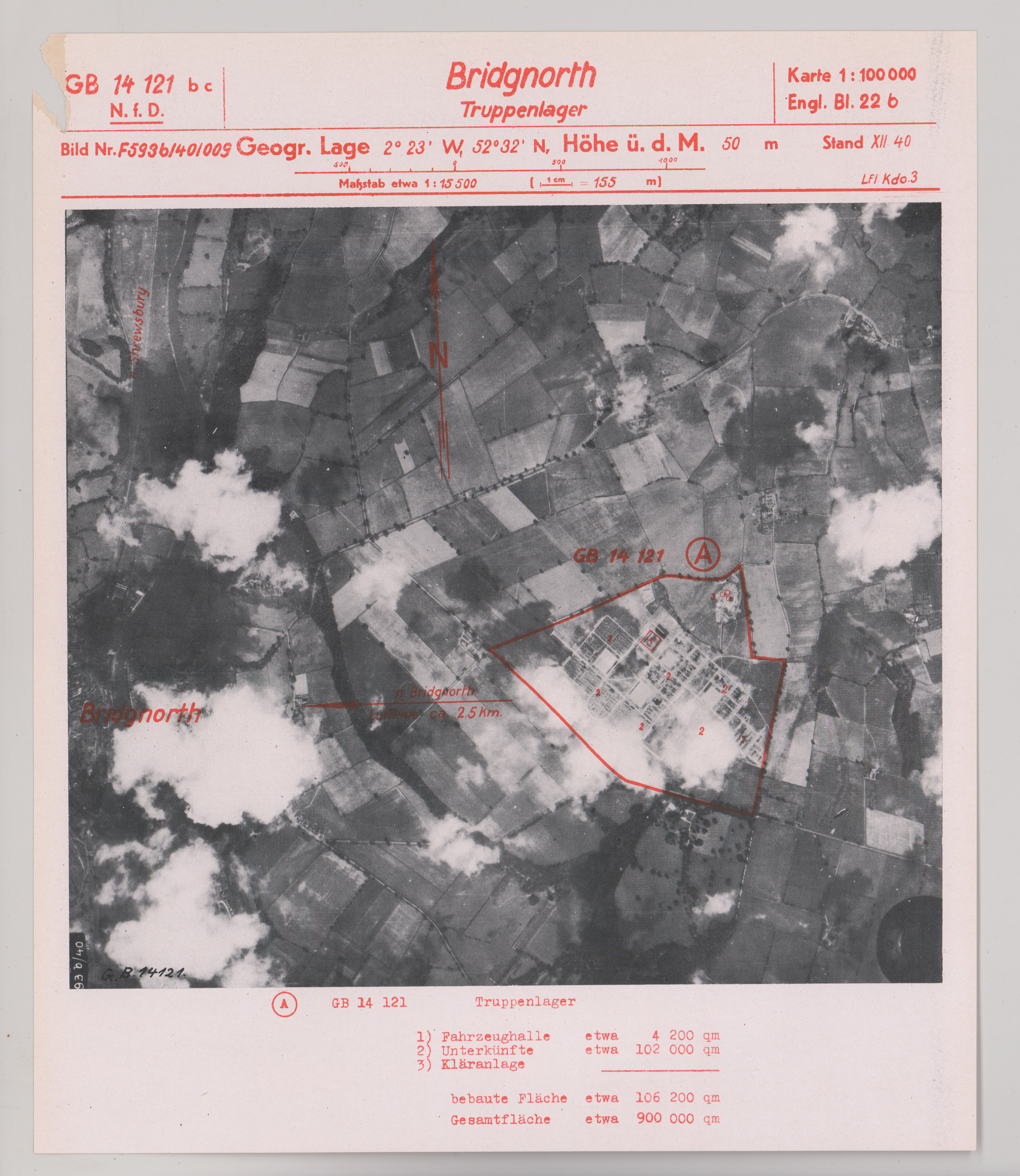
RAF Bridgnorth on a target dossier of the German Luftwaffe, 1940

The site was used for training WAAF, airmen and aircrew during the Second World War. It was also a reception centre for forces personnel returning from the Dunkirk evacuation which included Czech, Dutch and French forces too.

Aircrew training consisted of No. 1 Elementary Air Navigation School, the Empire Air Navigation School, No.s 14, 18, 50, 70, 80 & 81 Initial Training Wings (ITW's) which covered training in air gunnery, navigation, bomb-aiming and wireless operating. From 1939 until well into 1946, the station had a 114-bed hospital. However, besides the 3,000 – 4,000 station personnel to cater for, the station hospital also served around 3,000 people from the local area, which saw the bed numbers rise to 140 by 1940.

== Post Second World War ==
Only after the war ended in 1945 could the Station revert to its original task of providing basic training to recruits, as the No. 7 School of Recruit Training. It retained that name until closure in 1963. The unit badge carried the Latin motto Haec porta moenia viri (This is the gate, the walls are men).

In December 1943, a flu epidemic on the station meant that all the WAAF personnel were moved off camp so that their quarters and living areas could be fumigated. Training continued with basic recruits being billeted in hangars around the base.

On Armistice Sunday 6 November 1949, a massed parade of 3,400 men supported the Mayor of Bridgnorth. On 12 April 1950 the Borough of Bridgnorth granted RAF Bridgnorth the Freedom of Entry to the town. It was the first RAF Station to be granted Freedom of Entry in the United Kingdom. Also in 1950, No 7 School of Recruit Training was 'adopted' by Training Command under a patronage scheme that saw all 5 recruit training schools being adopted by one of the Royal Air Force Commands.

On 7 June 1951, RAF Bridgnorth exercised its right for the first time to march through the town, via the North Gate, with bayonets fixed, drums beating and colours flying. An Avro Lancaster flew overhead. That was only possible after the RAF Service had received the King's Colours on 26 May 1951.

Tens of thousands of recruits passed through Bridgnorth for their initial eight weeks training or ‘square bashing’ as it was called and included entertainer Des O’Connor, comedian Ronnie Corbett and ex-test cricketers Cyril Washbrook and Raman Subba Row. One of the notable commanders on recruit training after the Second World War was Squadron Leader George 'Johnny' Johnson, one of the aircrew who took part in the Dambusters Raid.

The Station closed down on Friday 8 February 1963. A commemorative plaque was unveiled on the former '3' Wing mess hall / cook house chimney on 28 May 1994. The chimney is now in the part of the former RAF Station that has been designated a Country Park.
