= Phillip Heseltine (cricketer) =

English cricketer

Personal information
- Full name: Phillip John Heseltine
- Born: 21 June 1960 (age 66); Skipton, Yorkshire, England
- Batting: Right-handed
- Bowling: Right-arm off break/medium
- Relatives: Peter Heseltine (brother)

Domestic team information
- Years: Team
- 1991–1995: Lincolnshire
- 1988–1989: Berkshire
- 1983: Oxford University

Career statistics
Competition	FC	LA
Matches	6	2
Runs scored	176	32
Batting average	19.55	16.00
100s/50s	–/–	–/–
Top score	40	30
Balls bowled	–	–
Wickets	–	–
Bowling average	–	–
5 wickets in innings	–	–
10 wickets in match	–	–
Best bowling	–	–
Catches/stumpings	5/–	1/–
- Source: Cricinfo, 8 August 2010

Phillip John Heseltine (born 21 June 1960) is an English former cricketer. Heseltine was a right-handed batsman who bowled off break and medium pace. He was born at Skipton, Yorkshire.

Heseltine made his first-class debut for Oxford University against Sussex in 1983. During the 1983 season he represented the university in 6 first-class matches, with his final appearance coming against Cambridge University. In his 6 first-class matches, he scored 176 runs at a batting average of 19.55, with a high score of 40. In the field he took a single catch for the university.

Heseltine made his debut for Berkshire in the 1988 Minor Counties Championship against Shropshire. From 1988 to 1989, he represented the county in 14 Minor Counties Championships matches, with his final appearance for the county in that competition coming against Shropshire. He also represented Berkshire in a single MCCA Knockout Trophy match against Oxfordshire in 1989. Additionally, he also made his debut in List-A cricket for the county against Sussex in the 1989 NatWest Trophy.

In 1991, Heseltine joined Lincolnshire, making his debut for the county in the 1991 Minor Counties Championship against Hertfordshire. From 1991 to 1995, he represented the county in 29 Minor Counties Championship matches, with his final appearance coming against Staffordshire. He also represented the county in 6 MCCA Knockout Trophy matches. He also represented the county in a single List-A match against Nottinghamshire.

In his 2 List-A matches, he scored 32 runs at a batting average of 16.00 and a high score of 30.

== Family ==
His brother, Peter Heseltine, played first-class and List-A cricket for Sussex and Minor Counties Championship and List-A cricket for Durham.
