= Hazledine and Company =

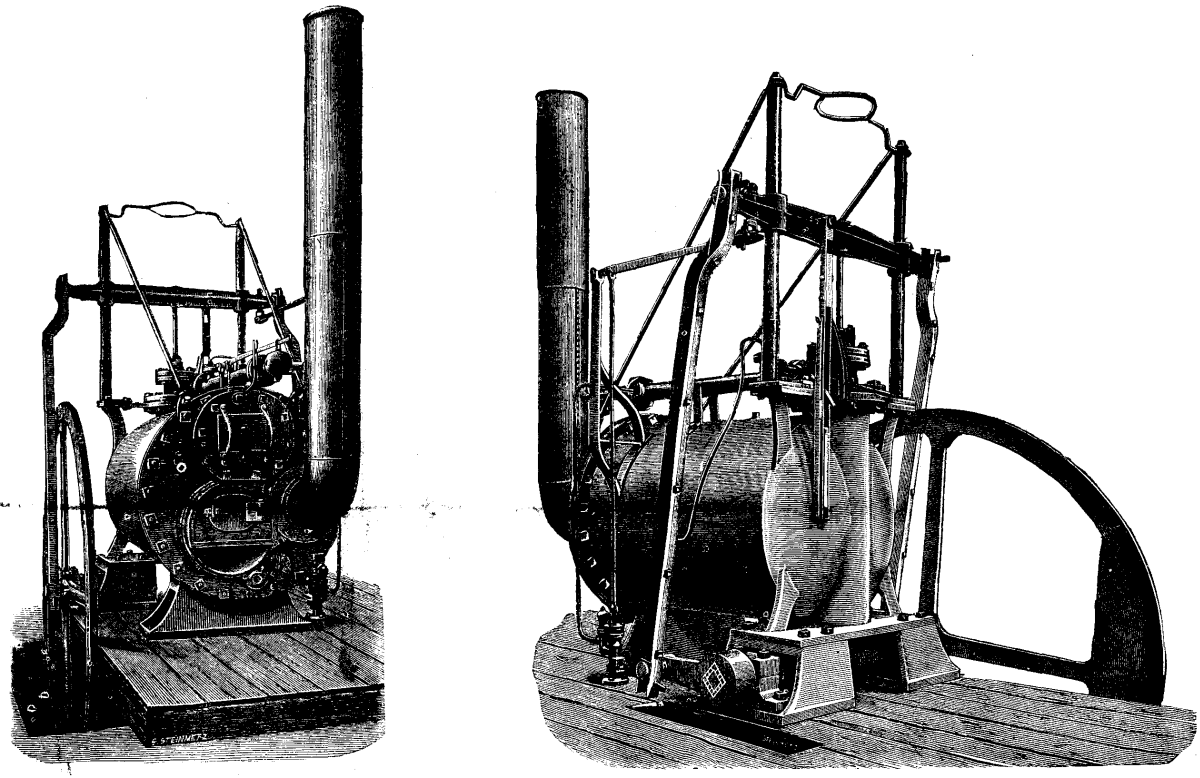

Hazledine and Company (or Hazeldine and Company) was an ironworks in Bridgnorth, Shropshire, England. It was set up about 1792 by three brothers: John Hazledine (1760–1810), Robert Hazledine (1768–1837) and Thomas Hazledine (1771–1842). Sources differ about the partnership - Discover Shropshire claims that the partners were John Hazledine, William Hallen and John Wheeler.

== The company ==
The company built up a good reputation for the quality of its castings but, in 1797, John Hazledine was declared bankrupt. It seems that some accommodation was made with his creditors because the company remained in business. From 1802, Richard Trevithick placed several orders with the company for the construction of steam engines, including the locomotive Catch Me Who Can, built in 1808.

In 1807, John Hazledine entered into partnership with John Urpeth Rastrick, to form the company Hazeldine and Rastrick but the partnership was a troubled one. John Hazledine died in 1810, and Rastrick left the company in 1817. In 1819, Rastrick formed a partnership with James Foster to form Foster, Rastrick and Company.

In 1823, the company, now under Robert Hazledine, went bankrupt. However, it re-emerged on a smaller scale in 1824, supplying goods for the local market. In 1829–30, the creditors forced a sale and the property was sold in two tranches in 1834 and 1835. Even so, John Hazledine (Robert's son) was still in business as an ironfounder in 1840/41, but at a different address. When John died, in 1843, the Hazledine business finally came to an end.

== The Hazledine family ==
William Hazledine (1734–1818) was a millwright at Shawbury, Shropshire. He married Mary Morgan and they had four sons: John, William, Robert and Thomas.

John

John Hazledine was born in 1760. In 1774, he was apprenticed, either to his uncle or his father. In 1782 he married Ann Davies of Eardington. He set up the ironworks, with brothers Robert and Thomas, about 1792. He died in October 1810. and has an iron tombstone.

William

William Hazledine was born in 1763. He became a pioneering ironmaster and died in 1840.

Robert

Robert Hazledine was born in 1768. He married in 1794 and had a son, John (1796-1843). Robert died in 1837.

Thomas

Thomas Hazledine was born in 1771 and died in 1842. Little else is known about him.
