= List of Old Bridgnorthians =

The following is a list of notable Old Bridgnorthians, former pupils of Bridgnorth Grammar School (now Bridgnorth Endowed School) in Bridgnorth, Shropshire, England.

== Army ==
- General Sir Charles Warren, GCMG, KCB, FRS (1840–1927), Commissioner of the Metropolitan Police and General in the Second Boer War.

== Church ==
- William Bree, Archdeacon of Coventry (1887–1908)
- Rev. Robert William Eyton (1815–1881), Rector of Ryton and author of The Antiquities of Shropshire (1853–60).
- Bishop James Fraser (1818–1885), reforming Bishop of Manchester.
- Rev. Osborne Gordon (1813–83), Rector of Easthampstead and influential Oxford don.
- Bishop Thomas Percy (1729–1811), Bishop of Dromore and author of Reliques of Ancient English Poetry (1765).
- Bishop Francis Henry Thicknesse (1829–1921), inaugural Suffragan Bishop of Leicester.

== Medicine ==
- Thomas Beddoes (1760–1808), physician and scientific writer.
- William Macmichael (1783–1839), physician to Kings George IV and William IV and author of The Gold-Headed Cane (1827)

== Politics ==
- Sir John Josiah Guest, 1st Baronet, MP (1785–1852), engineer, entrepreneur, and Member of Parliament.
- Ralph Lingen, 1st Baron Lingen (1819–1905), influential civil servant.
- John Lloyd (1833–1915), Welsh-born London County Councillor
- Henry John Roby, MP (1830–1915), classical scholar, writer on Roman law, and Member of Parliament.

== Science ==
- Professor Peter Bullock (1937–2008), Nobel Peace Prize winning scientist who was keen for soil to be used as a sustainable resource.

== Sport ==
- Cyril Washbrook, CBE (1914–1999), cricketer who played for Lancashire and England.

== Stage and screen ==
- Sir Cedric Hardwicke, KBE (1893–1964), Hollywood character actor.
- Ross Antony (1974–), British television personality in Germany.
