= Thomas Rowley (headmaster) =

English headmaster

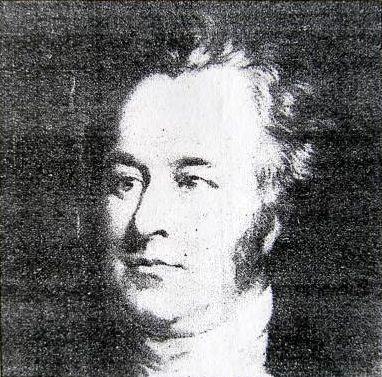
Portrait of Thomas Rowley

Dr Thomas Rowley (24 August 1796 – 11 November 1877) was a successful headmaster of Bridgnorth Grammar School between 1821 and 1850. He was a member of the Canterbury Association, was Dean-designate for the yet to be built ChristChurch Cathedral in Christchurch, New Zealand, but he never emigrated.

== Early life ==
Thomas Rowley was born in Middleton Scriven in Shropshire in 1796. His parents were the Rev. Richard Rowley (d. 1812) and Mary Rowley. He was educated at Shrewsbury and at Christ Church, Oxford, from where he obtained a BA (1819), BD and DD (1839).

== Bridgnorth Grammar School ==
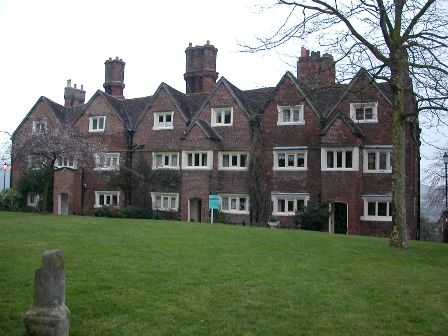
Bridgnorth Grammar School – The Headmaster's House

In 1821, when Rowley was twenty-four years old, he was appointed Headmaster of Bridgnorth Grammar School in Bridgnorth, Shropshire, on the recommendation of the Dean of Christ Church, Oxford. Under Dr Rowley's leadership Bridgnorth Grammar School's reputation increased. Dr Rowley's success as a teacher of the Classics soon attracted boarders (housed in the Headmaster's House in St Leonard's Close) from far and near. His pupils included not only Bridgnorth boys, but also those from further afield. The numbers rose to about 150. In 1841 Dr Rowley was attacked by some members of the Town Council who complained of the treatment of the day-boys by the boarders and of the Bridgnorth Grammar School's concentration on the Classics; but the Bridgnorth Borough Treasurer wrote in Rowley's defence that the day-boys can hardly not have benefited from the specialist teachers whom Rowley was able to engage.

Distinguished former pupils of Dr Rowley included Bishop James Fraser, the reforming Bishop of Manchester, Lord Lingen, the influential civil servant, Henry John Roby, the classical scholar, writer on Roman law and Member of Parliament, Rev. Robert William Eyton, Rector of Ryton and author of The Antiquities of Shropshire. and Rev. Osborne Gordon, the influential Oxford don.

Dr Rowley's successors after 1850 had not his ability, and accordingly the School's numbers and reputation, and their own emoluments, declined. The East Window of the St Leonard's Church in Bridgnorth was replaced in memory of Dr Rowley. Rowley House (red), one of the Bridgnorth Endowed School's three houses, is named after Dr Rowley.

== Later life ==
Rowley joined the Canterbury Association on 10 April 1851 as a committee member. He purchased land from the association in Canterbury, New Zealand. He was assigned land at Barrys Bay at the head of Akaroa Harbour (technically, his son Thomas bought this land, but it is believed that Rowley Sr paid for it) and at Middleton in Christchurch. He was chosen as the Dean-designate for the yet to be built ChristChurch Cathedral, but he never came out to the colony. His appointment upset Bishop Selwyn, and the proposed cathedral chapter was dropped again until the cathedral was built.

== Family ==
Rowley's sons John Cotton Rowley and Thomas Rowley emigrated to New Zealand. Thomas, who emigrated in 1853, became a Member of Parliament, but returned to live in Guernsey. John remained in New Zealand.
