= Robert Eyton =

Robert Eyton may refer to:

- Robert William Eyton (1815–1881), English clergyman and author
- Robert Eyton (priest, died 1751), Anglican priest, Archdeacon of Ely
- Robert Eyton (priest, died 1908), Anglican priest, Rector of St Margaret's, Westminster
- Robert Eyton (MP), Member of Parliament (MP) for Much Wenlock
