= Church of St Cross, Clayton =

Church in Manchester, England

Coordinates: 53.4834°N 2.1819°W

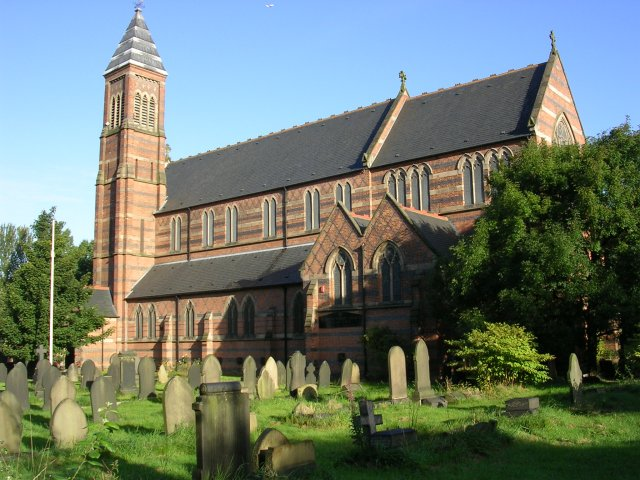
- Church of St Cross, Clayton
- OS grid reference: SJ 88016 98539
- Country: England
- Denomination: Anglican
- Tradition: Modern Catholic
- Website: www.stcrosschurchclayton.org

History
- Dedication: Holy Cross
- Consecrated: 1874

Architecture
- Architect: William Butterfield
- Style: Gothic Revival
- Years built: 1863–1866

Administration
- Diocese: Manchester
- Archdeaconry: Manchester
- Deanery: Manchester North and East
- Benefice: Clayton St Cross with St Paul

Clergy
- Rector: Fr. Chris Moore

The Church of St Cross, Clayton, Manchester, is a Victorian church by William Butterfield, built in 1863–1866. It was designated a grade II* listed building in 1963.

== History ==
The land on which the Church of St Cross now stands was originally in the parish of St Mary Droylsden. In the early 1860s the land was gifted to Revd. Charles Henry Lomax by Peter Hoare. The Gothic Revival architect William Butterfield was invited to draw up plans for the new church and construction began in 1862. At the time of construction, Bishop Prince Lee was in charge of Manchester Diocese. Lee, a low churchman, did not take to the ornate decorative style of St Cross and initially refused to consecrate the parish church, despite the opening services happening in 1866. Bishop James Fraser eventually consecrated the church in 1874. Originally, St Cross was built without many stained glass windows. On the closure of the Church of St Peter, in nearby Oldham, in 1970, sixteen of its stained glass windows were gifted to St Cross and are now located in the nave.

The churchyard contains the war graves of seven soldiers of World War I and two of World War II.

== Architecture and description ==
The church is very tall, in Butterfield's trademark red brick, with blue brick and pale stone banding. The style is Middle Pointed. To the south-west, the church has a high tower, "narrow and tall, with slender angle buttresses and a steep pyramidal roof of banded slate, and a gabled south porch with 2-centred arched doorway".

The interior has lost most of its furnishings but remains "unmistakably Butterfield". It has a timber-framed roof with five-bay arcades, with patterns of coloured stone and tiles that have been echoed in late 20th century stencilling. There is some notable stained glass of the patron saints of the British Isles. The church is a Grade II* listed building.

== See also ==
- Grade II* listed buildings in Greater Manchester
- Listed buildings in Manchester-M11

== Sources ==
- Hartwell, Clare; Hyde, Matthew; Pevsner, Nikolaus (2004). Lancashire: Manchester and the South East. The Buildings of England. New Haven, US and London: Yale University Press. ISBN 0-300-10583-5.
