= Bridgnorth Endowed School =

Coordinates: 52.538°N 2.422°W

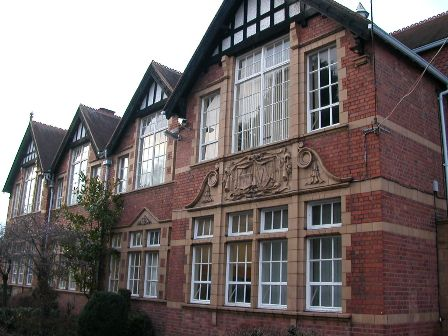
- 1908 New Grammar School Building at Northgate

Location
- Northgate; Bridgnorth, Shropshire, WV16 4ER; England

Information
- Type: Academy
- Established: 1503; 523 years ago
- Founder: Bridgnorth Borough Corporation
- Department for Education URN: 139143 Tables
- Ofsted: Reports
- Chair: Mark Freathy
- Headteacher: Michael Penn
- Gender: Coeducational
- Age: 11 to 16
- Enrolment: 601 (2026)
- Houses: Scientia, Veritas, Virtus, Invictus
- Website: http://www.bridgnorthendowed.co.uk/

Bridgnorth Endowed School (BES), formerly Bridgnorth Grammar School, is a coeducational secondary school for pupils aged 11 to 16 in Bridgnorth, Shropshire, England.

Founded in 1503 by the Corporation of the Borough of Bridgnorth, it merged with Bridgnorth Girls' Public High School in 1929, became a comprehensive school in 1974, and adopted its current name that same year. It converted to academy status in 2013. The school's main building on Northgate, near Cliff Road, opened in 1908. It later became a specialist school and a Technology College.

== History ==
=== 16th, 17th and 18th centuries ===
Bridgnorth Endowed School was founded in 1503 during the reign of Henry VII of England, as a 'common school' established by the Corporation of the Borough of Bridgnorth. Its early funding included revenues from the chantries of St Leonard's Church. After the dissolution of the chantries in 1548, during the reign of Edward VI, an annual payment of £8 from the Exchequer was assigned in perpetuity to a schoolmaster maintaining a grammar school in Bridgnorth.

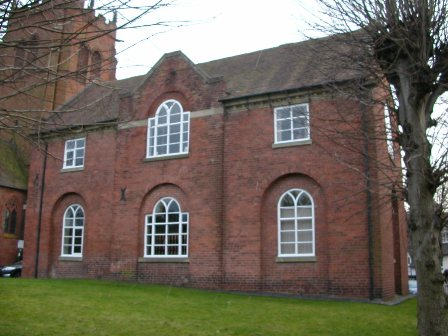
The 'Old Grammar School' in St Leonard's Close with the tower of St Leonard's Church in the background

A barn, which had been used as the chapel of St John the Baptist (the new Bridgnorth Town Hall was also built in 1652 using material from a dismantled barn), first housed the school. This stood on the north side of St Leonard's churchyard outside St Leonard's Church. By the end of the sixteenth century, the former chapel of St John the Baptist was being described as the 'old school-house'. The former chapel of St John the Baptist was replaced in 1595, in the reign of Elizabeth I, by the present building in St Leonard's Close known as the 'Old Grammar School ', which now houses a firm of accountants. The building appears to have been erected by Rowland Hayward, a Bridgnorth-born merchant who became Lord Mayor of London and a Member of Parliament for the City of London. Hayward's son, Sir John Hayward, referred to his father's foundation of the school in his will of 1635. Sir Rowland appears to have charged a property at Bridgnorth with an annual payment of £20 to the school, a payment later rendered by the Apley estate after Sir William Whitmore purchased the land in question in 1623. In 1785, during the reign of George III, the 'Old Grammar School' was renovated with gifts of £200 each given by the town's members of Parliament, Major Whitmore and Admiral Pigot. The 'Old Grammar School' building still stands in St Leonard's Close.

Grammar School House, c1629/39 arched brick doorway with a wooden sign that reads The Akeds & St Leonard's Close/

During the reign of Charles I in 1639, Sir William Whitmore erected a house on the east side of St Leonard's Church which part was to be occupied by the headmaster at a nominal rent, and the remainder by the minister of St Leonard's Church. Whitmore's building, now Grade II* listed still stands in St Leonard's Close. The school was named by Edward Careswell of Bobbington as one of the several free grammar schools in Shropshire, also including Shrewsbury, Newport, Wem, Shifnal and Donnington to benefit by his will, which in 1690, during the reign of William III and Mary II devoted certain local properties to the maintenance of eighteen, later reduced to ten, scholars from these schools at Christ Church, Oxford University. These Careswell Exhibitions were first awarded in 1746, during the reign of George II. For 160 years Bridgnorth shared in the resulting close connexion between Shropshire and Christ Church, Oxford, until in 1905 the Exhibitions became tenable elsewhere.

The school was kept clean by the labour of 'a poor boy of the said School' who was paid 4 pence annually by each of his fellows; normal repairs were paid for by the town; the town also added a further £10 to the school's annual income, but when that income had to be divided between the headmaster and the usher (who took the younger boys) it was naturally difficult to find and still more so to keep good masters. In 1635, for instance, the school contained only six boys..

=== 19th century ===
In 1817 the Town increased its subsidy to £30, but in 1821 there were only ten boys, when the Dean of Christ Church, Oxford, who had been asked to recommend a candidate, proposed as headmaster 24-year-old Thomas Rowley of Middleton Scriven. The numbers rose to about 150. In 1841 Rowley was attacked by some members of the Town Council who complained of the treatment of the day-boys by the boarders and of the school's concentration on the Classics; but the Borough Treasurer wrote in Rowley's defence that the day-boys can hardly not have benefited from the specialist teachers whom Rowley was able to engage. The East Window of the St Leonard's Church was replaced in memory of Rowley. Rowley's successors after 1850 had not his ability, and accordingly the school's numbers and reputation, and their own emoluments, declined. Unsuccessful attempts were made to acquire some of the funds of the Careswell trust for the improvement of the school's buildings and endowments.

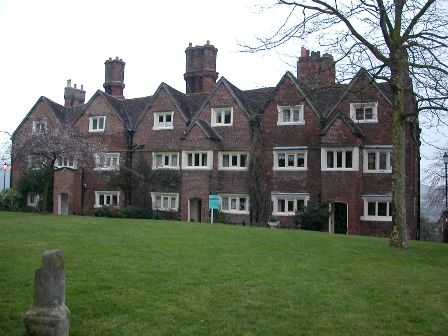
Headmaster's House in St Leonard's Close

=== 20th century ===
In 1909 the school passed into the control of Shropshire County Council, the new Grammar School building at Northgate having been built in 1908. (This building still forms the core of the present-day school and in 2003 a clock was placed on the outside of the building to mark the school's 500th anniversary.) In the years immediately previous to 1908 classes were held in three places – the Headmaster's House in St Leonard's Close, the Foster Memorial Institute in the High Street, and the 'Old Grammar School' building in St Leonard's Close. Until 1929, the Bridgnorth Girls' Public High School led an independent existence in the new Grammar School building at Northgate.

During the First World War some 250 old boys of the Grammar School served, of whom 39 – including three masters of the school – died. In their memory, a carved oak tablet listing the dead was unveiled in the entrance hall of the Northgate building, and a further memorial in the form of the school library was opened in 1930.

The Grammar School and the Bridgnorth Girls' Public High School were finally combined in 1929. The mixed school was 'transitionally aided' under the Education Act 1944; in 1955 it became voluntary controlled.

The school's name was changed from Bridgnorth Grammar School to Bridgnorth Endowed School in 1974 when it began the transition from a selective to a comprehensive intake. The new name reflected the Endowed School's history, referring to the endowments it had received. In the nineteenth century, the terms endowed school and grammar school were used interchangeably, as in the Endowed Schools Act 1869. In the second half of the twentieth century, the Endowed School's buildings and sporting facilities on the Northgate site were greatly expanded with a new Lower School complex and a new Leisure Centre, which the Endowed School had sole use of during the school day.

== Governance ==
BES is a school for pupils aged 11 to 16 that follows a three-tier education system. It converted to academy status on 1 March 2013 and joined the 3–18 Education Trust in September 2023. The school closed its sixth form in 2018. Students after Year 11, take a GCSE, and continue their education at sixth-form colleges.

In September 2023, the Ofsted inspection, rated the school as Good for overall effectiveness. The trust's chief executive was David O'Toole, and its chair was Gary Turner.

== School structure ==
The school has used a house system for pupils. Until 1983, its four houses were named Clive (green), Darwin (yellow), Hayward (pale red), and Talbot (azure blue), after historical figures associated with Shropshire. Between 1983 and 2021, the school had three houses: Hardwicke (yellow), Rowley (pale red), and Washbrook (green). These commemorated former headmaster Thomas Rowley and former pupils Cedric Hardwicke and Cyril Washbrook. In 2021, the school returned to four houses: invictus (unconquerable - blue), scientia (knowledge - green), veritas (truth - red), and virtus (courage - yellow).

== Curriculum ==
=== The Lower and Middle Schools ===
The curriculum followed throughout Year 7, Year 8 and Year 9 (Key Stage 3 of the National Curriculum) includes the full range of National Curriculum subjects plus a second foreign language and PHSE. In years nine, Year 10 and Year 11 (Key Stage 4 of the National Curriculum), all pupils follow an extended core curriculum allowing all pupils to experience a broad range of subject areas up to the age of sixteen as well as reflecting the requirements of the National Curriculum.

=== The Sixth Form ===
There was a sixth form of 150 students until recent years. AS and A2 subjects offered to 6th form students in years 12 and 13 included Art, Biology, Business Studies, Chemistry, Design, Drama and Theatre Studies, English Language, English Literature, French, Further Maths, Geography, History, Information Technology, Maths, Music, Music Technology, Physical Education, Physics, Psychology, Religious Education, and Spanish. Year 12 students took four subjects at AS, and continued with three subjects at A2 in Year 13.

=== OFSTED Inspections ===
The Endowed School was inspected by OFSTED in 2003 and 2008. In 2003 the inspectors' overall evaluation was that 'this is a very good school.' In 2008 the inspectors agreed with the school's own self-evaluation that the school is providing 'a satisfactory standard of education ', and that 'many elements are good'. The 2003 OFSTED inspection had identified modern foreign languages as unsatisfactory. However, in 2008 the inspectors noted that there had been a 'great improvement in the leadership of modern foreign languages since the last inspection.' An OFSTED inspection has recently taken place; the school received a 'satisfactory' in most areas, pupils' behaviour being one of the best, rated as 'good', while the maths department was the least achievable. OFSTED stated that the improvement in maths and English was a minor improvement and more work should be done to improve.

In 2011, the school got satisfactory (3), with many of the student categories earning good (2).

GCSE performance
| Measure | BES |
|---|---|
| Attainment 8 score (2024–25) | 44.4 |
| Grade 4 or above in English and mathematics (2024–25) | 65.8% |
| Grade 5 or above in English and mathematics (2024–25) | 39.2% |

== Extracurricular activities ==
The Endowed School offers a wide range of extracurricular activities. Pupils can partake in modern, classical and musical drama productions.

There are school trips abroad. Pupils also take part in charity activities. In Autumn 1989, a pupil was awarded an Army Scholarship for eventual entry to the Royal Military Academy Sandhurst subject to clearances and examination results.

=== Sport ===
Instrumental lessons are also available to pupils. Pupils can take part in aerobics, athletics, badminton, basketball, bowls, cricket, cross-country running, dance, darts, gymnastics, hockey, netball, rounders, rugby, snooker, soccer, horse club, craft club, squash, swimming, and tennis.

In November 2025, the school reported that it had been named Secondary School of the Year at the Shropshire Cricket Board Awards.

== Campus ==
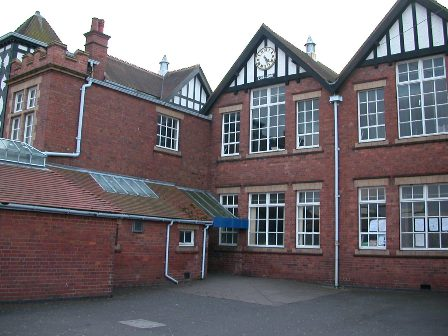
The clock installed to mark the school's 500th anniversary

The school is situated on Northgate in Bridgnorth, Shropshire. Its campus includes a leisure centre, which opened in 1976.

== Notable alumni ==
Former pupils are known as 'Old Bridgnorthians'.

- Ross Antony (1974–), singer and TV entertainer in Germany.
- Thomas Beddoes (1760–1808), physician and scientific writer.
- David Breakwell (1946–), cricketer.
- Peter Bullock (1937–2008), soil scientist, member of the Intergovernmental Panel on Climate Change.
- Robert William Eyton (1815–1881), Rector of Ryton and author of The Antiquities of Shropshire (1853–60).
- James Fraser (bishop), Bishop of Manchester
- Osborne Gordon (1813–1883), influential Oxford don.
- John Josiah Guest, 1st Baronet (1785–1851), engineer, entrepreneur, and Member of Parliament.
- Cedric Hardwicke, (1893–1964), actor
- Rob Hornby (1995–) jockey.
- David Humphries (1953–2020), cricketer.
- Ralph Lingen, 1st Baron Lingen (1819–1905), permanent secretary of the Treasury.
- John Lloyd (1833–1915), barrister and politician
- William Macmichael (1783–1839), physician to Kings George IV and William IV and author of The Gold-Headed Cane. (1827).
- John Mason (1920–2009), historian and librarian at Christ Church, Oxford
- Thomas Percy (1729–1811), Bishop of Dromore and literary editor.
- Max Rafferty (1983–), guitarist.
- Henry John Roby (1830–1915), classical scholar and politician.
- Francis Henry Thicknesse (1829–1921), inaugural Suffragan Bishop of Leicester. (born Francis Henry Coldwell)
- Matthew Turner (1973– ), cricketer
- Charles Warren GCMG, KCB, FRS (1840–1927), Commissioner of Police of the Metropolis during the Jack the Ripper murders.
- Cyril Washbrook, (1914–1999), cricketer.
- David York (1941–), cricketer.

== Former headteachers ==
The school's documented former headteachers include:

- Richard Cornes (1677–1726), who also served as an incumbent of St Mary's Church in Bridgnorth.
- Hugh Stackhouse (1726–1743), who also served as an incumbent of St Mary's Church. Who was a clergyman and theological writer who bequeathed his collection of books to Bridgnorth.
- After 1766, no usher was appointed; but the emoluments could not now support even a single master unless he could attract boarders to the school.
- Thomas Rowley (appointed 1821; left 1850), whose teaching of the classics attracted boarders and increased the school's enrolment to about 150.

== See also ==
- List of the oldest schools in the United Kingdom
- List of the oldest schools in the world
- List of Old Bridgnorthians
