= Ropewalk Dingle =

The Ropewalk Dingle Countryside Site is located by the river in the centre of Bridgnorth, in Shropshire. The Grid Reference is SO718934. The site was historically involved in the extension of the Severn Valley Railway that travelled through this area to Ironbridge. The dingle area has many remains of this historic railway left behind which serves as a reminder to the site. One of these features include an abandoned railway tunnel which marks the Southern boundary of the site, and is owned and maintained by British Rail.

== Background ==
Ropewalk Dingle is part of the prior Severn Cliff House Gardens, and is owned and managed by Shropshire Council.

In 2008 it was officially named Ropewalk Dingle by a public online vote, as it previously had many other names such as The Dingle, Bramble Ridge, and Severn Cliff.

== Access ==
There are three main paths to get to Ropewalk Dingle.

1. Follow a path from Cliffs Road Entrance that leads to Bridgnorth Leisure Centre. This pathway links in with St Leonard's Church, another curious site in Bridgnorth.
2. Another access point is one already known most by both tourists and the locals, but this one leads to the Riverside instead.
3. Access to Riverside can be found by Friars Street, another route walked by tourists, this travels from the town to the River Severn.

These three entry pathways to the site make it ideal for people to access it at different areas in Bridgnorth.
