= Elijah Fenton =

English poet, biographer and translator

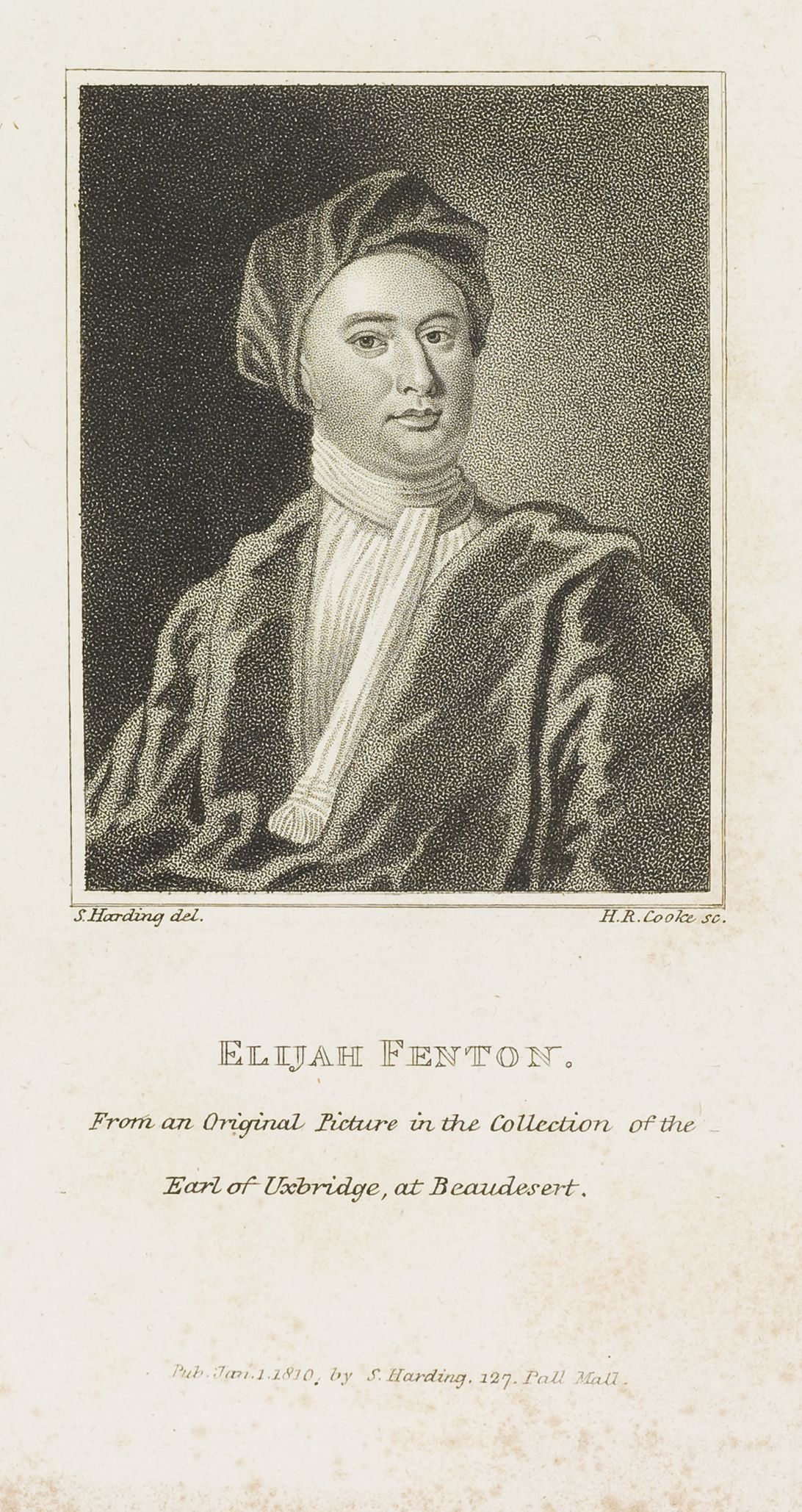
- Born: 20 May 1683; Shelton, Staffordshire, England
- Died: 16 July 1730 (aged 47); Easthampstead, Berkshire, England
- Education: Jesus College, Cambridge
- Occupations: Poet, biographer, translator

Elijah Fenton (20 May 1683 – 16 July 1730) was an English poet, biographer and translator.

== Life ==
Works by Elijah Fenton

Born in Shelton (now Stoke-on-Trent), and educated at Jesus College, Cambridge, for a time he acted as secretary to the Charles Boyle, 4th Earl of Orrery in Flanders, and was then Master of Sevenoaks Grammar School.

In 1707, Fenton published a book of poems. He later became tutor to Sir William Trumbull's son at Easthampstead Park in Berkshire and is now best known as the assistant of his neighbour, Alexander Pope, in his translation of the Odyssey, of which he 'Englished' the first, fourth, nineteenth, and twentieth books, catching the manner of his master so completely that it is hardly possible to distinguish between their work; while thus engaged he published (1723) a successful tragedy, Mariamne. His later contributions to literature were a Life of John Milton, and as an editor of Edmund Waller's Poems (1729).

He died on 16 July 1730, and is buried in the churchyard of Stoke Parish Church, Stoke-on-Trent.

Fenton's memorial stone

There is a memorial to him on the wall of St Michael and St Mary Magdalene's Church, Easthampstead, with an epitaph by Alexander Pope. This reads:-

To the memory of Elijah Fenton of Shelton in Staffordshire,
who dyed at Easthampstead Anno 1730, aged forty seven years.
In honour of his great integrity & Learning.
William Trumbell Esq erected this monument.

This modest stone what few vain marbles can
May truly say, here lies an honest man
A poet blest beyond the poets fate
Whom heav'n left sacred from the proud and great
Foe to loud praise and friend to learned ease
Content with science in the vale of peace
Calmly he look'd on either life & here
Saw nothing to regret, or there to fear
From natur's temp'rate feast rose satisfy'd
Thank'd heav'n that he had liv'd and that he dy'd.

A. POPE
