= Listed buildings in Manchester-M11 =

Manchester is a city in Northwest England. The M11 postcode area of the city includes the suburbs of Clayton and Openshaw. This postcode area contains 16 listed buildings that are recorded in the National Heritage List for England. Of these, two are listed at Grade II*, the middle of the three grades, and the others are at Grade II, the lowest grade. Most of the listed buildings in the area are associated with the Ashton Canal, which runs through it; these consists of locks, bridges, and a lock keeper's cottage. The other listed buildings are a former manor house, a bridge in the grounds of the manor house, two churches, a school, and a former club.

== Key ==
Grade	Criteria
II*	Particularly important buildings of more than special interest
II	Buildings of national importance and special interest

== Buildings ==
Name and location	Photograph	Date	Notes	Grade
Clayton Hall; 53.48366°N 2.18011°W		15th century (probable)	A former manor house on a moated site, later altered and extended, and divided into two dwellings. It is in two parts, with two storeys, and each part has three bays and a stone-slate roof. The older part is in red brick with the upper storey timber framed. The central bay projects, it has a jettied gable, and a bellcote on the ridge. On the ground floor is a doorway and a casement window, and above the windows are mullioned. The later part is in brick with quoins, a segmental-headed doorway, and casement windows. Inside are timber framed partitions. The hall stands on a moated site, the moat now dry, which is a scheduled monument.	II*
Bridge over moat, Clayton Hall; 53.48324°N 2.18018°W		17th century (probable)	The bridge over the moat, now dry, is in sandstone. It consists of two segmental arches with bands, a central pier rising to form a refuge, parapets with stone benches, and stone gate posts at the inner end.	II
Lock No. 6, Ashton Canal; 53.48572°N 2.19896°W		c. 1792–1799	The lock is in millstone grit and some brick, and has wooden gates. The chamber is 7 feet (2.1 m) wide, there is a covered overflow channel on the south side, and stone staircases at the lower end on the west side. There is an extended bullnose at the top end of the island.	II
Lock No. 7 and roving bridge, Ashton Canal; 53.48579°N 2.19748°W		c. 1792–1799	The lock is in millstone grit, it has wooden gates, and the chamber is 7 feet (2.1 m) wide. Over the lower entry is a roving bridge that has a cobbled doglegged ramp on north side, a stone slab wall and cast iron fences.	II
Lock No. 8, Ashton Canal; 53.48271°N 2.18791°W		c. 1792–1799	The lock is in millstone grit and some brick, and has wooden gates. The chamber is 7 feet (2.1 m) wide, there is an overflow channel on the north side, and stone staircases flanking the lower end.	II
Lock No. 9, Ashton Canal; 53.48114°N 2.18330°W		c. 1792–1799	The lock is in millstone grit, and has wooden gates, double at the lower end and single at the upper end. The chamber is 7 feet (2.1 m) wide, there is a covered overflow channel on the north side, and a bullnose at the lower end, rebuilt in blue engineering brick.	II
Lock No. 10, Ashton Canal; 53.48074°N 2.17996°W		c. 1792–1799	The lock is in millstone grit and some brick, with replacements in sandstone, and has wooden gates, double at the lower end and single at the upper end. The chamber is 7 feet (2.1 m) wide, there is an overflow channel on the north side, and stone staircases at the lower end on the south side.	II
Lock No. 11, Ashton Canal; 53.48036°N 2.17696°W		c. 1792–1799	The lock is in millstone grit and some brick, with replacements in sandstone, and has wooden gates, double at the lower end and single at the upper end. The chamber is 7 feet (2.1 m) wide, there is an overflow channel on the north side, and a stone staircase at the lower end on the south side.	II
Lock No. 12, Ashton Canal; 53.48015°N 2.17512°W		c. 1792–1799	The lock is in millstone grit and has wooden gates, double at the lower end and single at the upper end. The chamber is 7 feet (2.1 m) wide, there is an overflow channel on the north side, and stone staircases at the lower end.	II
Bridge No. 9, Ashton Canal; 53.48576°N 2.19790°W		c. 1800 (probable)	The bridge carries the A6010 road over the canal. It is in brick with some sandstone, and consists of a horizontal span with cast iron beams and concrete flags. The walls have coping and piers in gritstone, and broad pilasters.	II
Towpath bridge, Ashton Canal; 53.48036°N 2.17807°W		c. 1800 (probable)	The bridge carries the towpath of the canal over the entrance to the Stockport Branch of the canal, now disused. It is in red brick and sandstone with cast iron beams, and consists of a horizontal span with long abutments. The deck is cobbled, and the parapets have ridged coping.	II
Church of St Cross, Clayton; 53.48346°N 2.18195°W		1863–1866	The church was designed by William Butterfield in Gothic Revival style. It is built in red brick, with bands in blue brick and sandstone, blue brick diapering, sandstone dressings, and slate roofs. The church consists of a nave with a clerestory, a west narthex, north and south aisles, a chancel with low transepts, and a southwest tower with a south porch. The tower has angle buttresses, and a pyramidal roof.	II*
Lock keeper's cottage 53.48568°N 2.19747°W		1865	The cottage is to the south of lock No. 7 of the Ashton Canal. It is in brown brick, with a sill band in black and white brick, sandstone dressings, and a slate roof. It has a double-depth plan, two storeys, and a symmetrical two-bay front. On the front is a gabled porch with a dated lintel, and the windows are casements with large lintels.	II
Varna Street School; 53.46944°N 2.16877°W	—	1896–97	The school has an iron frame with brick cladding, stone dressings, string courses, and shaped gables. It is in Flemish Renaissance style, it has three storeys and a basement, and consists of a central block with flanking pavilions. The doorways have triangular pediments, above them is lettering, and the windows are sash windows.	II
Crossley House (former Crossley Lads' Club); 53.47405°N 2.18675°W		1912	A former recreational club in reinforced‑concrete, red‑brick and terracotta with a symmetrical three‑bay front. It has two storeys and a basement, with a recessed central bay containing a twin‑arch entrance and two tiers of windows above. The outer bays have paired sashes and hipped roofs, and the side and rear elevations are in common brick with expressed concrete framing and large multi‑pane windows.	II
St Willibrord's Church; 53.48564°N 2.17716°W		1938	A Roman Catholic church built in buff brick and in Byzantine style. It consists of a nave with a west narthex and a south porch, north and south aisles, north chapels and vestry, a chancel with an apse, and a low square central tower. The aisles have three gables on each side, and contain round-headed lancet windows in blank arches. The tower contains a band of small rectangular windows, and its base is splayed. Inside the church are three sail domes.	II
