= Listed buildings in Middleton Scriven =

Middleton Scriven is a civil parish in Shropshire, England. It contains three listed buildings that are recorded in the National Heritage List for England. All the listed buildings are designated at Grade II, the lowest of the three grades, which is applied to "buildings of national importance and special interest". The parish contains the village of Middleton Scriven and the surrounding countryside. All the listed buildings are in the village, and consist of a timber framed house, a farmhouse, and a church.

== Buildings ==
Name and location	Photograph	Date	Notes
Oak Cottage; 52.48332°N 2.47429°W	—	Early 17th century	A timber framed house with brick infill on a stone base and with a tile roof. It has two storeys and an L-shaped plan, with a massive stone chimney breast. The windows are casements.
Manor Farmhouse; 52.48550°N 2.47123°W	—	Early 19th century (probable)	The farmhouse is in brick with a tiled roof. It has three storeys and three bays. The windows are casements, and on the front is a rustic gabled porch.
St John the Baptist's Church; 52.48488°N 2.47101°W		1845–46	The church replaced an earlier church on the site, and is built in grey sandstone with dressings in freestone and tile roofs. It is in Early English style, and consists of a nave, a lower and narrower chancel, and a south porch. There is a bellcote on the west gable, the porch has prominent bargeboards, and the windows are lancets.
