= Middleton Scriven =

Village in Shropshire, England

Coordinates: 52.482717°N 2.462323°W

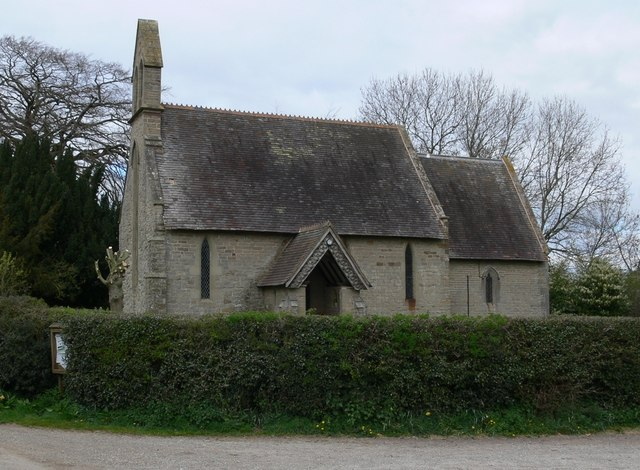

- Location within Shropshire
- Area: 7.82 km^{2} (3.02 sq mi)
- Population: 143 (2011 census)
  - Density: 18/km^{2} (47/sq mi)
- OS grid reference: SO687873
- Civil parish: Middleton Scriven
- Unitary authority: Shropshire
- Ceremonial county: Shropshire
- Region: West Midlands
- Country: England
- Sovereign state: United Kingdom
- Post town: Bridgnorth
- Postcode district: WV16
- Police: West Mercia
- Fire: Shropshire
- Ambulance: West Midlands
- UK Parliament: Ludlow

Middleton Scriven is a village and civil parish 20 miles (32 km) south east of Shrewsbury, in the Shropshire district, in the county of Shropshire, England. In 2011, the parish had a population of 143. In 2011, Nomis recorded a population of 146. The parish borders Stottesdon, Sidbury, Deuxhill and Chetton.

== Features ==
There are 3 listed buildings in Middleton Scriven. Middleton Scriven has a church called St John the Baptist's Church.

== History ==
The name "Middleton" means 'Middle farm/settlement'. Middleton was recorded in the Domesday Book as Scriven Middeltone. Middleton Scriven was formerly just Middleton.

Thomas Rowley (1796-1877), later headmaster of Bridgnorth Grammar School and a member of the Canterbury Association to establish the colony in New Zealand now the Canterbury Region, was born in Middleton Scriven.
