= John Mason (historian) =

British historian and academic (1920–2009)

- Born: 9 June 1920; Pembrokeshire, Wales
- Died: 31 October 2009 (aged 89)
- Occupations: Historian; academic
- Children: 1

Academic background
- Education: Bridgnorth Grammar School; Jesus College, Oxford

John Mason (9 June 1920 – 31 October 2009) was a British historian and academic.

== Life ==
John Mason was born in Pembrokeshire, west Wales, on 9 June 1920. He studied at Bridgnorth Grammar School in Shropshire, and then at Jesus College, Oxford, where he was a scholar. His university studies were interrupted by the Second World War: he won his scholarship in 1937, but did not obtain his first-class degree in history until 1948. During the war, he served with the Manchester Regiment and then in the Indian Army, reaching the rank of Major and working in the Mechanical Transport Training Centre as well as interpreting Urdu. In 1950, he began his association with Christ Church, Oxford, at which he would spend the remainder of his academic career. His first appointment was as a research lecturer, to deal with the papers of Robert Cecil, 3rd Marquess of Salisbury; Salisbury, who was Prime Minister from 1886 to 1892 and 1895 to 1902, studied at Christ Church between 1847 and 1849, and his papers were at that time held by the college. He became a "Student" (the term used by Christ Church for Fellows of the college) in 1957, retiring in 1987, and was also college librarian (succeeding Nowell Myres) from 1962 until his retirement.

His particular field of interest was the Norman Conquest, and one of his articles on Roger of Montgomery (the first Earl of Shrewsbury) and his sons, written in 1963, was described in his obituary in The Times as "indispensable for understanding how the Norman Conquest worked on the ground", particularly in Mason's home county of Shropshire. He also wrote a history of Bridgnorth and co-authored (with E. G. W. Bill) Christ Church and Reform, 1850–1867, looking at the changes in Oxford during the 19th century. Overall, though, he published comparatively little, but was highly regarded as a tutor at the college. He died on 31 October 2009, survived by a daughter from his first marriage (his first wife having died in 1989) and by his second wife.
