= Osborne Gordon =

Osborne Gordon (1813–1883) was an English cleric and academic, known as an influential tutor at Christ Church, Oxford.

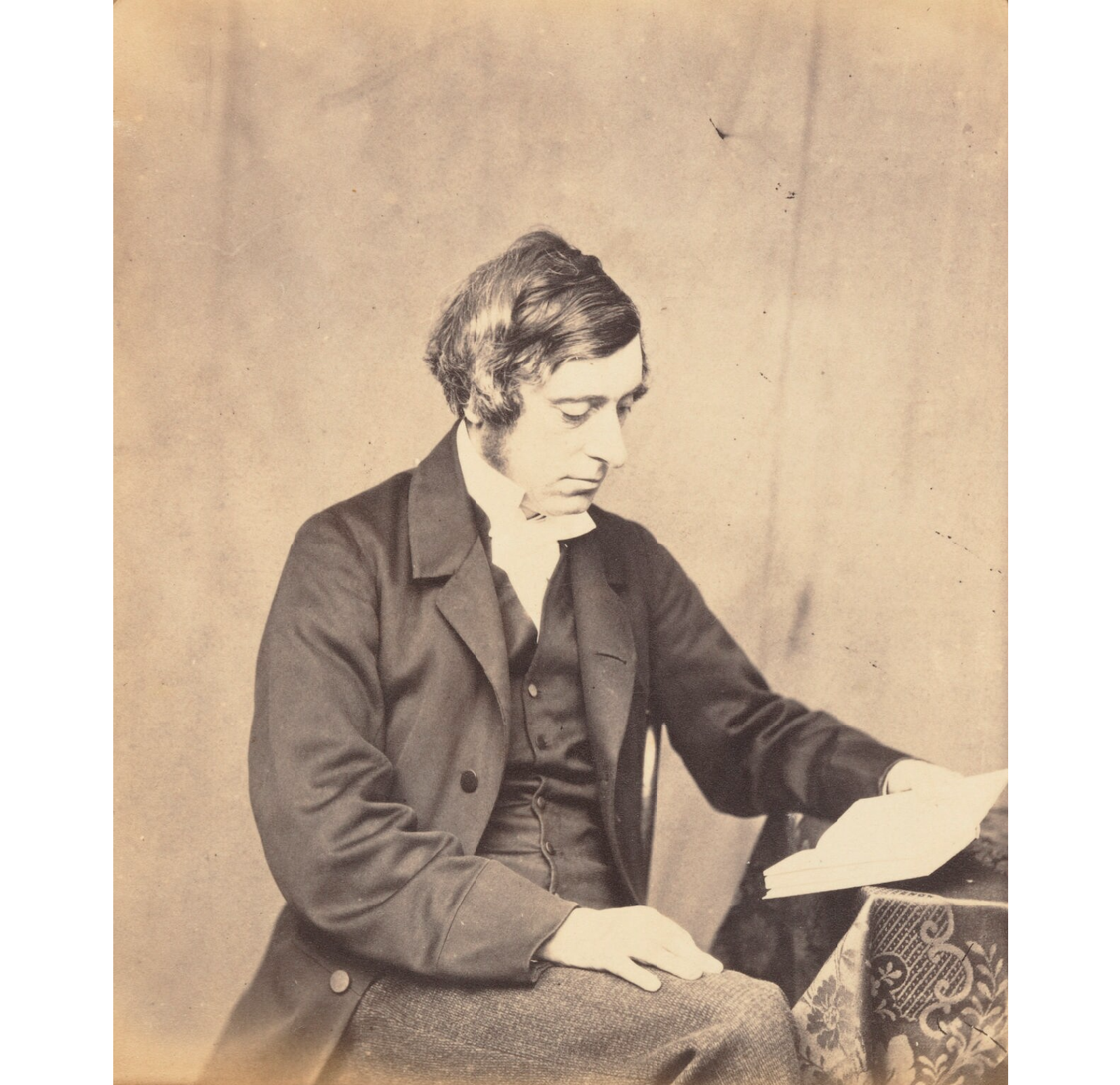
Osborne Gordon, 1857 photograph by Lewis Carroll

== Early life ==
He was born in Broseley, Shropshire, the son of George Osborne Gordon, a wine merchant, and his wife Elizabeth; his father died in 1822. His paternal grandfather was Alexander Gordon, of the Southwark distillers Gordon & Co., noted for Gordon's Gin. His sister Jane married in 1845 the barrister, architect and politician John Pritchard.

Gordon was educated at Bridgnorth Grammar School, under Thomas Rowley, and was elected a Careswell exhibitioner to Christ Church, Oxford in 1832 and matriculated there. He came into residence the following year. He had a distinguished undergraduate career, and was nominated for a Christ Church studentship in 1834 by the Dean, Thomas Gaisford, and in 1835 becoming a Dean Ireland scholar, for a Greek verse composition on a Francis Chantrey monument. He graduated B.A. in 1836 with first-class honours in classics and mathematics.

== Oxford don ==
Osborne graduated M.A. in 1839, and B.D. in 1845. At Christ Church he was a Senior Student, and served as proctor and censor; he also acted as a University Examiner. A number of his former students became distinguished in public life. John Ruskin was a privately tutored pupil of Gordon, at his home in Herne Hill in 1839. Gordon arrived with the advice recorded in Praeterita, "When you have got too much to do, don't do it". The father, John James Ruskin, later became a Christ Church benefactor. Under Gordon's influence, Ruskin read the theologian Richard Hooker; and a long friendship was established.

Bertram Freeman-Mitford, 1st Baron Redesdale, at Christ Church during the 1850s, in his memoirs called Gordon a "brilliant character", a "finished scholar, very witty, with a great appreciation of character". He gave an anecdote of Gordon replying to a parent, Ernest Vaughan, 4th Earl of Lisburne, who asked how much allowance to give his son Ernest Augustus Malet, who matriculated at Christ Church in 1855: "Well, Lord Lisburne, you can give your son any allowance you like, but please remember that his debts will always be in proportion to his allowance."

In 1854 Gordon was elected to the first Hebdomadal Council of the university. Gaisford died in 1855, and Henry Liddell became Dean. Initially Liddell wintered in Madeira for his health, and, with the sub-dean Charles Carr Clerke, Gordon was involved as censor in college business.

His Times obituary called Gordon "a sound and moderate Churchman" and "a Tory of the deepest hue." He grew uneasy at Christ Church under Liddell, and the statutes were reformed to change its governance in 1858. He sought to take a college benefice. In 1859 the Prince of Wales was admitted to Christ Church. Gordon was nominally his tutor, but Herbert William Fisher took on the duties.

== Parish priest ==
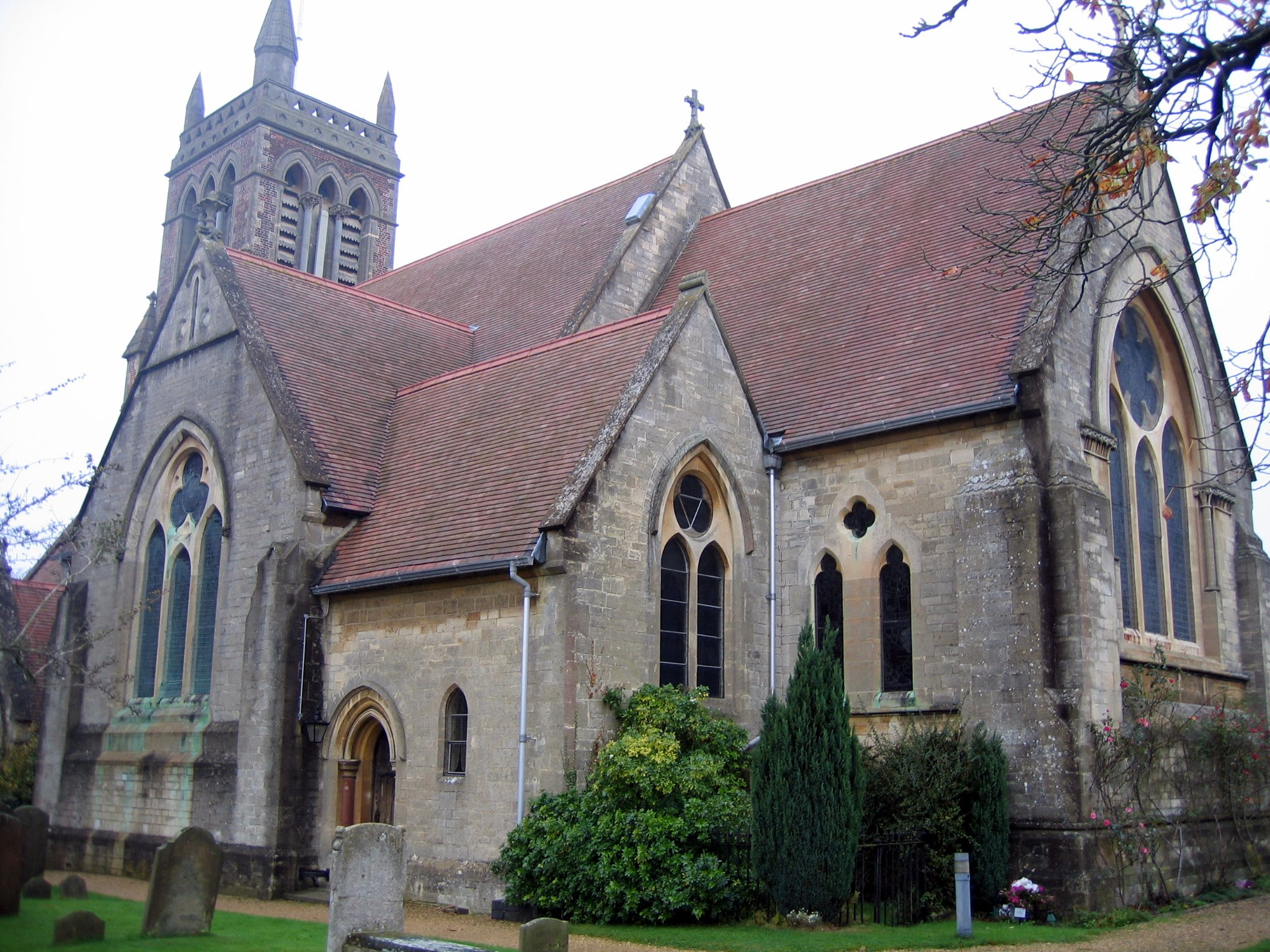
Easthampstead Parish Church

In 1860 Gordon became Rector of Easthampstead in Berkshire: he replaced there Rev. Abraham Boyle Townsend, in what was a Christ Church living, who had been the incumbent from 1826, and died that year. Townsend had pulled down the derelict parsonage in 1836, for lack of funds to maintain it, and it had not been replaced. He had also been at odds with his neighbour Arthur Hill, 4th Marquess of Downshire at Easthampstead Park, who had been rebuffed by Christ Church when he had offered to buy the advowson.

In September 1863, Gordon travelled to France with John Ruskin, to examine a prospective house purchase at Bonneville, Haute-Savoie. Gordon, who had been briefed by Ruskin's parents, dissuaded Ruskin from proceeding to buy it.

Gordon enlarged the parish schools and rebuilt the parish Church of St Michael and St Mary Magdalene. In 1865 it was announced that the church would be reconstructed by Gordon, the Marquess of Downshire, Sir William Hayter, 1st Baronet and others. The architect for the work carried out in 1867 was John West Hugall. After the death in 1874 of Arthur Hill, 5th Marquess of Downshire, Edward Burne-Jones was commissioned to design an east window of the church, on the Last Judgement, and it was made by Morris & Co.

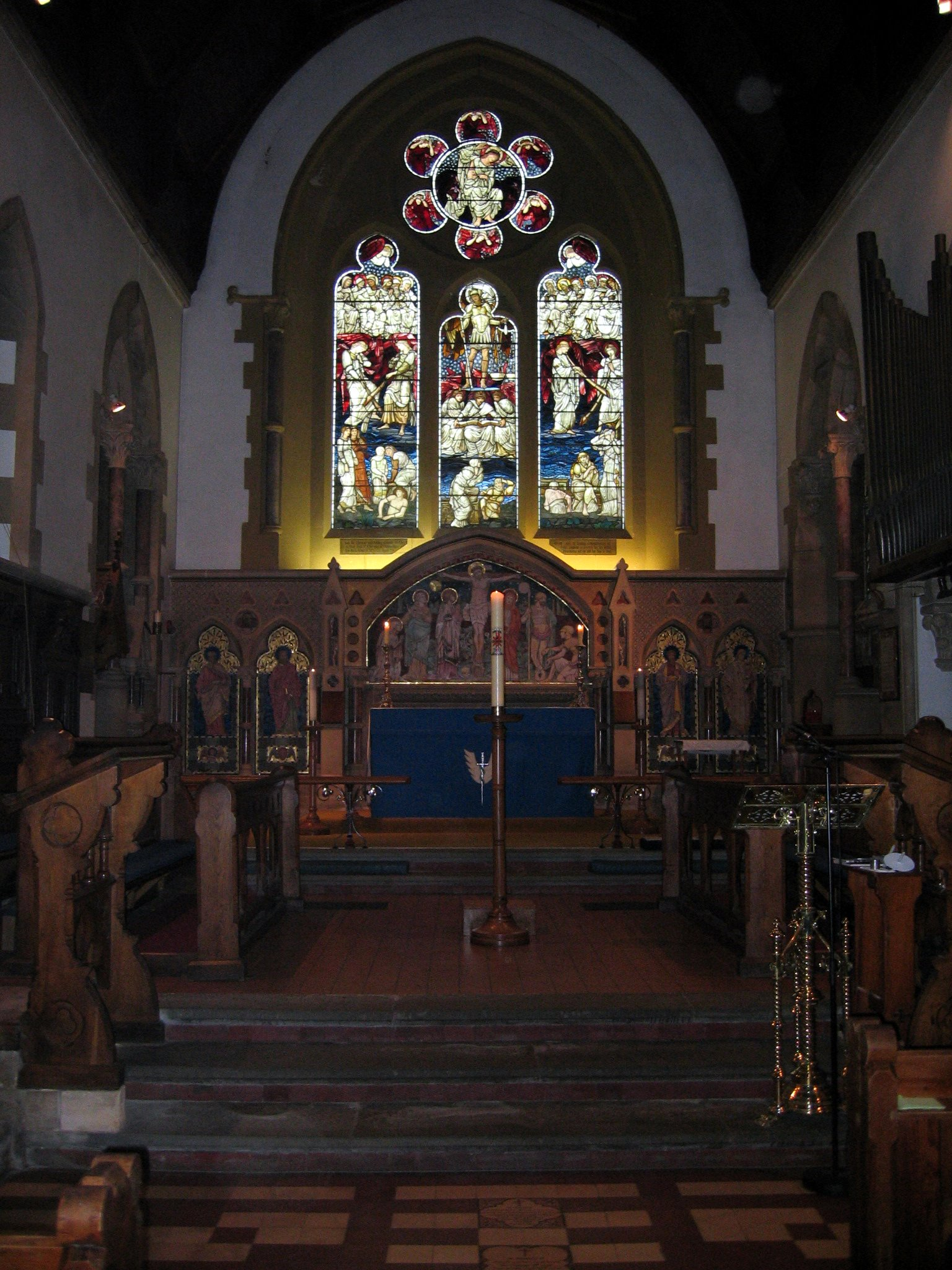
Easthampstead Church, 2008 view of the chancel and east window

== Later life and death ==
In later life, Gordon was an examiner for the Indian Civil Service and Army. He was involved on reforms of HMS Britannia and the Naval School, Greenwich. In 1876 he was appointed chairman of a commission on the Queen's Colleges, founded 1845 in Ireland. He replaced of William Robert Grove on the board of commissioners for the University of Oxford.

Algernon West, who matriculated at Christ Church in 1850 and was one of Gordon's pupils, noted that in 1881 he still combined incongruously an "overpowering" case of the proverbial remark "The Englishman dearly loves a lord " with h-dropping.

Early in 1883 Gordon fell into poor health, and died on Friday, 25 May 1883, at home in Easthampstead. He was buried there, and his memorial has an inscription by John Ruskin, whom he had taught. A monument to him by Conrad Dressler was commissioned for Christ Church Cathedral.

== Works ==
Osborne published:

- Εύσεβίου τού ΠαμΦιλιον Ίστορίας έκκλησιαστικής λόγοι δέκα. Eusebii Pamphili Historiæ Ecclesiasticæ Annotationes variorum, Oxford, 1842.
- Considerations on the Improvement of the Present Examination Statute, and the Admission of Poor Scholars to the University, Oxford, 1847; two editions of this work were published in that year.
- A Sermon preached in the Cathedral Church of Christ in Oxford on Easter Day, 1861, Oxford, 1861.
- The Great Commandment and Education, London, 1870.
- A sermon delivered by the Rev. Osborne Gordon, B.D., to his congregation at Easthampstead, on the deficiency of religious instruction in connection with certain proposals for national education.

== Family ==
Gordon did not marry. He left the bulk of his property to his brother Alexander John Gordon, who died intestate a month after him, falling in an accident from a carriage.
