= St Michael and St Mary Magdalene's Church, Easthampstead =

Coordinates: 51°24′05″N 0°45′37″W

Church of St Michael and St Mary Magdalene
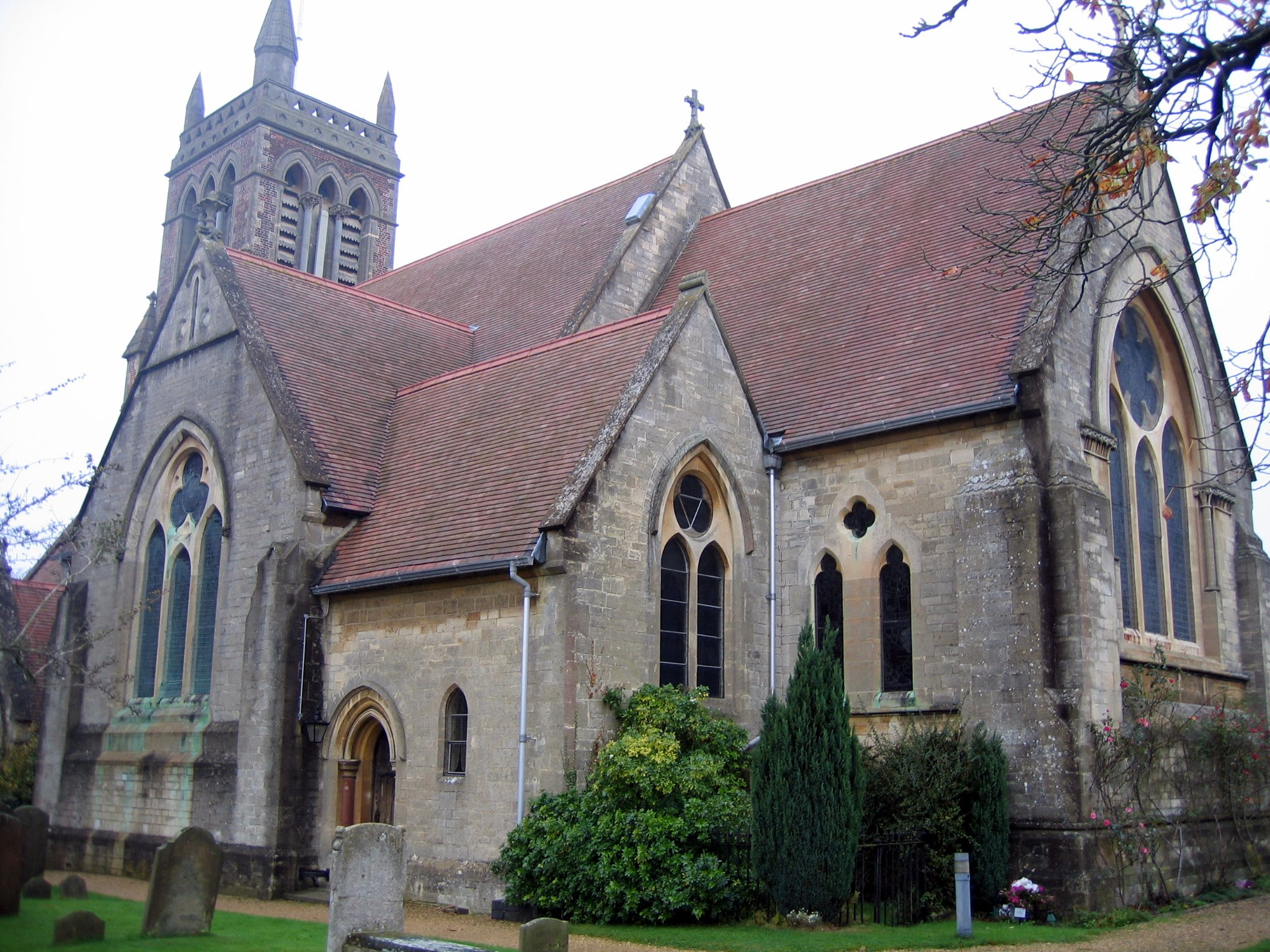
- View of the front of the Church
- Church of St Michael and St Mary Magdalene
- OS grid reference: SU 86334 67657
- Location: Bracknell
- Country: England
- Denomination: Church of England
- Churchmanship: Liberal Catholic
- Website: www.stmichaelseasthampstead.org.uk

History
- Status: Active

Architecture
- Functional status: Parish Church
- Heritage designation: Grade II
- Completed: 1867

Administration
- Province: Province of Canterbury
- Diocese: Diocese of Oxford
- Archdeaconry: Archdeaconry of Berkshire

Clergy
- Rector: Revd Gareth Morley

The Church of St Michael and St Mary Magdalene, is the Parish Church of Easthampstead, Berkshire.

== History ==
The Church in Easthampstead has a very long history. Below are some of the listed highlights of the history.

No record of the Church exists in the Domesday Book.

12th Century The earliest reference to the Church in Easthampstead is in 1159AD when Lawrence Abbot of Westminster granted 'the church of Jezhamstede' to Hurley Priory, 'so that they may observe and venerate the Festival of the Blessed Saint Edward the Confessor, who died January 5th, 1066'. This earliest mention of a church is supported by an order from Ralph de Arundel, prior of Hurley, in 1176AD, that "Easthampstead Church shall pay a yearly pension of 4s. to Saint Mary, Hurley, for the provision of wax tapers for the 'mass of Our Lady." The payment continued until the Reformation. The church, then dedicated to St. Mary, not St. Mary Magdalene, was a stone structure, with a square tower.

16th Century In 1540 the Abbey of Hurley had to surrender to the King and the property of the old priory passed into lay hands. Henry VIII gave the manor and the patronage of the church, to Charles Howard in 1544.

17th Century Sir William Trumbull bought the manor of Easthampstead in 1696 and sold the patronage to Thomas Power. Five years later Power sold it to Christ Church, Oxford, who purchased it out of the 'Fell bequest' to provide livings for needy clerks. They are still patrons to this day.

The first belfry was made of wood and was rebuilt in 1664 using bricks. A small nine-inch stone set in the outside wall of the tower commemorates this achievement, with the name Henry Boyer, 1664. He does not seem to have been one of the churchwardens so may have been the benefactor or the parish Overseer for the year of the construction. The Church is recorded as having a ring of 4 bells in 1699.

19th Century At sometime in its history the Church became known as St. Mary Magdalene. The reason for this is unknown. In 1866 the tower was raised to double the height of the 17th century structure. Made of brick, it was decorated and strengthened with ashlar and heavy Victorian stone tracery and surmounted by three narrow little pinnacles and one much larger, to protect the end of the spiral staircase. The bell-loft is large with triple louvred lights on each side, ornately decorated with zigzag patterning. A further tenor and treble were added.

Lady Caroline, Marchioness of Downshire (who resided at Easthampstead Park) and Revd. Osborne Gordon were responsible for the complete rebuilding of the church in 1867, and chose a London architect, J. W. Hugall for the task. He designed a building in the style of Victorian Gothic revival, using stone throughout except for the tower.

When the Church was rebuilt it was dedicated to St. Mary Magdalene and St. Michael. However a few years later the church is referred to, and is to this day as, St. Michael and St. Mary Magdalene.

It is a large building of ashlar stone erected, except for the lower part of the tower. It consists of a chancel, south-east vestry and organ chamber, nave, south transept, north aisle, south porch, south-west baptistery and north-west tower.

== Interior ==
Several notable pieces of ancient church furniture have been preserved. The original plain stone font was given a modern base and placed in the enlarged south aisle baptistry. Portions of the 15th Century rood screen were incorporated in a screen below the Organ. The pulpit is a combination of Victorian woodwork and recovered wood from the old Jacobean pulpit. Below are some of the listed highlights of the interior.

Font The font, which is that of the former church, has a plain octagonal bowl on a modern base. The screen below the organ, facing the transept, appears to have been made up from the former rood screen, with 15th-century tracery below and 14th-century tracery above. There are also two shortened buttressed muntins and four pieces of 17th-century pierced ornament are placed above the screen. On the north side towards the chancel are four similar traceried heads.

Pulpit The pulpit is made up of 17th-century woodwork; a panel on the north face has the following inscription: '1631, Unto this place a zeale I beare, to the widdows mit I may cumpear per me William Aylward.'

Monuments Many slabs and monuments have been preserved from the former church; the oldest slab is to Edmund Thorold, who died in 1646. On the north wall is a marble slab to Elijah Fenton, the poet, of Shelton, Staffordshire, who died in 1730; on it is the following epitaph composed by Alexander Pope: 'This modest stone, what few vain marbles can, May truly say, Here lies an honest man, A poet, blessed beyond the poet's fate, Whom Heaven kept sacred from the proud and great, Foe to loud praise and friend to learned ease, Content with Science in the Vale of Peace, Calmly he looked on either life, and here Saw nothing to regret or there to fear; From Nature's temp' rate feast rose satisfied, Thanked Heaven that he had lived, and that he died.'

On the east wall of the nave is a small brass with the half-length figure of a man in a loose cloak belted at the waist, to Thomas Berwyk, who died in 1443.

In the tower walling is reset a small stone inscribed 'Henry Boyer 1664.'

There are other memorials to the Trumbull and Downshire families, to the poet, Elijah Fenton, and to the polar explorer Frederick George Jackson.

Windows There are nineteenth-century stained glass windows by William Morris and four windows by Sir Edward Burne-Jones, including the great east window featuring the building's patron saint at the Last Judgment (from the Book of Daniel). This is probably the artist's best work in glass to be seen anywhere.

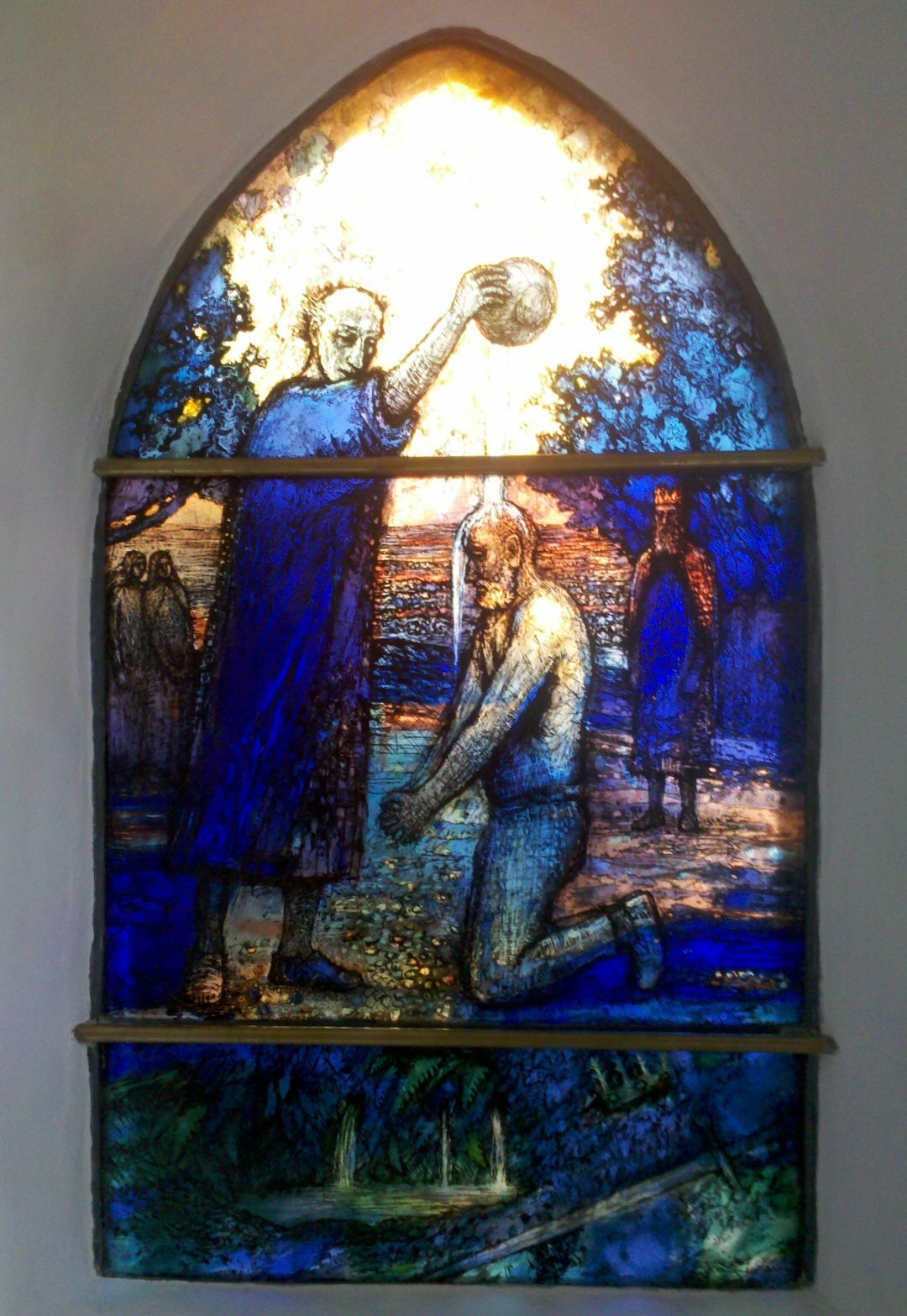
Baptism Of Cynegils

On 9 June 2013, a new stained glass window in the porch, by the artist Thomas Denny, was unveiled by John Nike OBE DL. The window depicts Cynegils King of Wessex's baptism, witnessed by King Oswald of Northumbria and two of the daughters of Cynegils. The baptism established Christianity in the Thames Valley and took place in Dorchester-on-Thames. The window marked the 60th anniversary of the coronation of Queen Elizabeth II.

== Churchyard and wildlife ==
In recognition of the wildlife interest, the churchyard was entered into the Living Churchyards and Cemeteries Project in 2002 and received an Award in 2004. Work undertaken as part of the entry into the project has included monitoring wildlife, erecting bat and bird boxes and planting wildflowers.

Despite its busy urban setting, the churchyard is a haven for wildlife. Over a hundred plant species are found here, including many traditionally found in churchyards, for example germander speedwell (Angel's eyes), snowdrops (Eve's tears) and greater stitchwort (Easter bell).

The tombstones support lichens and mosses. Insects use the crevices present in many of the stones for shelter, and the stag beetle, an increasingly threatened insect which is listed on the Borough's Biodiversity Action Plan, has been spotted here.

The oldest living organism in the churchyard is a veteran yew tree near the south gate. Its girth exceeds 13 feet and in February its male cones release drifts of pollen into the wind.
