= Listed buildings in Ryton, Shropshire =

Ryton is a civil parish in Shropshire, England. It contains eleven listed buildings that are recorded in the National Heritage List for England. All the listed buildings are designated at Grade II, the lowest of the three grades, which is applied to "buildings of national importance and special interest". The parish contains the villages of Ryton and Grindle and the surrounding countryside. Apart from two houses, Atchley Manor and Upper Atchley, the listed buildings are in the villages. These consist of a church, a monument in the churchyard, houses, cottages and farmhouses, a bridge, and a former school.

== Buildings ==
Name and location	Photograph	Date	Notes
Ryton Parish Church; 52.62244°N 2.35506°W		Medieval	The tower was added in 1710, the chancel in 1720, and the church was restored and the north aisle and vestry were added in 1886. The church is built in sandstone with tile roofs, and consists of a nave, a north aisle, a chancel and a north vestry, and a west tower. The tower has two stages, a clock face on the south front, an embattled parapet with corner pinnacles, and a copper weathervane.
Atchley Manor; 52.63187°N 2.33949°W	—	16th century	A farmhouse that was later extended, the early part is timber framed partly on a stone plinth with red brick infill, the extension is in red brick with a dentilled eaves cornice, and the roof is tiled. There are two storeys and attics. The original part consists of a hall range of probably 3½ bays, and a cross-wing of three bays, and the extension added a wing to give an H-shaped plan. Most of the windows in the upper floor are sashes, and in the ground floor they are casements, those in the extension having segmental heads.
Old Cottage; 52.62440°N 2.36845°W	—	Late 16th or 17th century	The cottage was extended later, the early parts are timber framed on a stone plinth, with brick infill, the extension is a long range at right angles in red brick, giving an L-shaped plan, and the roof is tiled. There are two storeys and attics, the original range has two bays, the doorway has a pedimented hood, and the windows are casements.
Lower Farmhouse; 52.62452°N 2.36596°W	—	17th century	The farmhouse was remodelled and extended in the 18th century. It is pebbledashed, probably with a timber framed core, and has a tile roof. There are two storeys and an attic, and three bays. In the centre is a Tuscan doorcase with reeded columns and a rectangular fanlight. Most of the windows are sashes, and there is a gabled eaves dormer.
4 Old Cottages; 52.62436°N 2.36651°W	—	Late 17th or early 18th century (probable)	The cottage is pebbledashed with a tiled roof. There is one storey and an attic, two bays, and single-storey lean-tos on both sides. The windows are casements, and there are two eaves dormers.
Ryton House Farmhouse; 52.62252°N 2.35098°W	—	Mid 18th century	The farmhouse is in red brick with a dentilled eaves cornice and a tile roof. There are three storeys, three bays, and a later rear extension. In the centre is a recessed doorway with a fanlight, in the ground floor is a Venetian window, and the other windows are sashes.
Bridge over Wesley Brook; 52.62062°N 2.35640°W		Late 18th century	The bridge carries a road over Wesley Brook. It is in sandstone and consists of a single segmental arch. The bridge has rusticated voussoirs and a keystone, four pilasters, a flat string course, and a plain parapet.
Upper Atchley; 52.62752°N 2.32723°W	—	1811	A red brick house on a stone plinth with a sill band, wide spreading eaves, and a double-span hipped tile roof. There are two storeys, and three bays. The central entrance has a conservatory porch, and the windows are sashes with plastered lintels and keystones.
Grindle House; 52.62460°N 2.37036°W	—	c. 1840	A stuccoed house on a stone plinth, with a hipped slate roof. There are three storeys, two bays, and a service wing to the left. On the left is a pedimented porch with a round-headed doorway, flanked by windows with keystones. The other windows are sashes.
The Old School; 52.62070°N 2.35758°W	—	c. 1850	The school, later a private house, is in red brick and has a tile roof with ornamental cresting. There are two storeys and four bays, two bays projecting forward and gabled with finials. The porch is gabled with a Tudor arch and a hood mould, and the windows in the upper floor are casements with Gothick heads. On the right gable end is a bell under a gabled canopy.
Roden monument 52.62254°N 2.35538°W	—	Mid 19th century	The monument is in the churchyard of Ryton Parish Church, and is to the memory of members of the Roden family. It is in sandstone with a square plan, it rests on globe supports, and tapers outward to the top where is a projecting moulded ledge surmounted by an urn finial with Greek key fretwork.
