= Matthew Turner (cricketer) =

English cricketer (born 1973)

Matthew John Turner (born 9 February 1973) was an English cricketer. He was a right-handed batsman who played for Shropshire. He was born in Bridgnorth and educated at Bridgnorth Endowed School.

Turner, who represented Shropshire in the Minor Counties Championship between 1993 and 1999, made a single List A appearance for the side, during the 1999 NatWest Trophy, against Hampshire Cricket Board. From the middle order, he scored a duck. He has been club captain of Shropshire in 1998, played also in the Worcestershire Second XI, and for Bridgnorth Cricket Club.
