= Clayton, Manchester =

District of Manchester, England

Coordinates: 53°29′05″N 2°10′49″W

Clayton
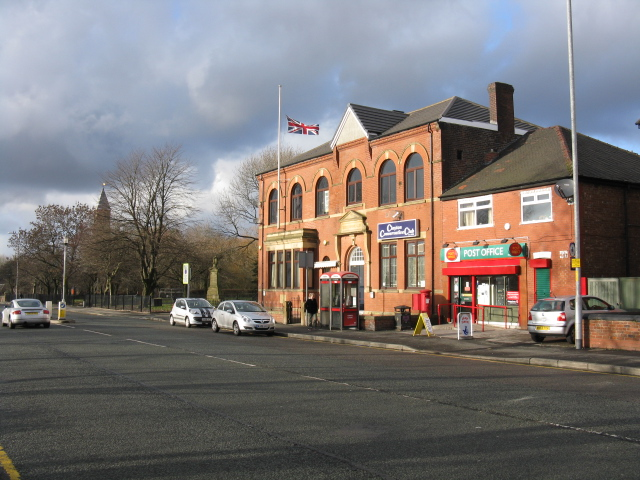
- Clayton Conservative Club and Post Office

- Location within Greater Manchester
- Metropolitan borough: Manchester
- Metropolitan county: Greater Manchester
- Region: North West
- Country: England
- Sovereign state: United Kingdom
- Post town: MANCHESTER
- Postcode district: M11
- Dialling code: 0161
- Police: Greater Manchester
- Fire: Greater Manchester
- Ambulance: North West

Clayton is a district of Manchester, England, 2.5 miles east of the city centre on Ashton New Road.

== History ==
Historically in Lancashire, Clayton takes its name from the Clayton family who owned large parts of land around the area, including Clayton Vale, through which the River Medlock flows, separating Clayton from Newton Heath. Clayton was under the township of Droylsden until around 1890 when alterations to the Manchester boundary took place. Other towns added to Manchester around this time were Blackley, Crumpsall, Moston, Openshaw and Gorton. In 1894 Clayton became a separate civil parish, being formed from the part of the parish of Droylsden in the County Borough of Manchester, on 26 March 1896 the parish was abolished to form North Manchester.

== Sport ==
Between 1893 and 1910, Clayton was home to Manchester United, and their precursor club Newton Heath L&YR, after Newton Heath left their North Road ground in the neighbouring district of Newton Heath. Bank Street had a capacity of 50,000 spectators, and was covered on all four sides. Shortly after Manchester United moved to their present ground, in Old Trafford, Bank Street was severely damaged in a storm and the remains were demolished soon after.

Manchester Velodrome opened at Clayton in September 1994 and a car park serving it was constructed on the site of Manchester United's old stadium.

== Clayton Hall ==
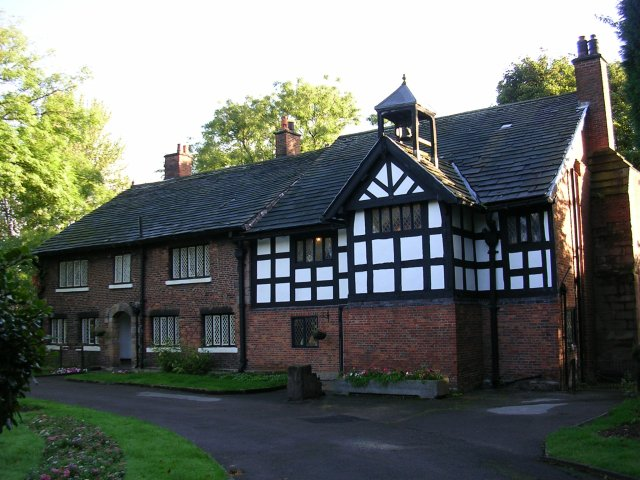
Clayton Hall today

Clayton Hall is a 15th-century hall on Ashton New Road, in Manchester, hidden behind trees in a small park. The hall is a Grade II* listed building, a scheduled monument, and is rare example of a medieval moated site (grid reference SJ88099857). It was originally built for the Clayton family, it passed on into the hands of the Byron family (of which the poet Lord Byron was a member) in 1194. They lived there until they sold it to two London merchants, George and Humphrey Chetham, in 1620. Humphrey Chetham is famous for founding Chetham's School and Library in the centre of Manchester.

During the Civil War, Royalist cavalry were stationed here, before the attack on Manchester. Afterwards, according to legend, Oliver Cromwell was said to have spent three nights at the Hall. In 1897, the building was acquired by Manchester City Corporation, ensuring its survival.

== Clayton today ==
Philips Park is on the south side of the River Medlock and Philips Park Cemetery is on the north side. The park has the distinction of being Manchester's first public park and Mark Philips, who was the Member of Parliament for Manchester, opened it in 1846. It was the first of its kind in the whole of the then Great Britain and Ireland and it set the standard for many others that soon followed in towns and cities throughout Britain. It was designed to have walks, expansive lakes and glasshouses for exotic plants. It is also famous for its annual tulip festival, which is still held every year. Philips Park Cemetery was opened in 1863.

The majority of houses in Clayton are council homes. The first council (or then known as corporation) homes to be built took place around the late 1920s, building near the border of Droylsden (Bristowe Street and South Crescent, followed by North Crescent). Many more homes were to be built afterwards, building on a brick works surrounding Clayton Street, a golf course off what is now Folkestone Road West and East and cricket and football grounds off North Road and Vale Street, now known as Lingfield Road. The building associated with the cricket and football grounds still stands today, now used as a boxing club.

Frank Pritchard, who lived in Clayton as young child in the 1920s, recalls in his book East Manchester Remembered: "... Clayton was rather a posh area. Beyond Bank Street one rarely saw children bare-footed, or with their breeches' behind torn and tattered which were common sights in the streets round where I lived."

Alderdale Golf Club (now defunct) first appeared in 1907. The club disappeared in the 1920s.

== Church and community ==
Father Alphonsus is the current priest at St. Willibrord's Church which is part of a new parish, The Parish of the Holy Spirit, along with two other nearby churches, St Bridget's, Bradford and St Anne's, Ancoats.

The church had some alterations to its interior in 2006-07, making the back of the church a focal point for various local community assemblies, where various charity fund-raising events are organized. In 2019-2020, there have been further interior improvements, with new gas central heating installed, meaning that the congregation now worships in a warm environment for the first time in decades.

The Church of St Cross was built in the 19th century and designed by William Butterfield. Butterfield was known for his budget conscious churches. The building is unique for its patterned brickwork and the richly furnished interior.

== See also ==
- Listed buildings in Manchester-M11
- Bank Street (football ground)
- Manchester Clayton (UK Parliament constituency)
- John Edward Sutton
- Edward Hopkinson
- Shayne Ward
