= Clayton Hall =

Listed building in Manchester, England

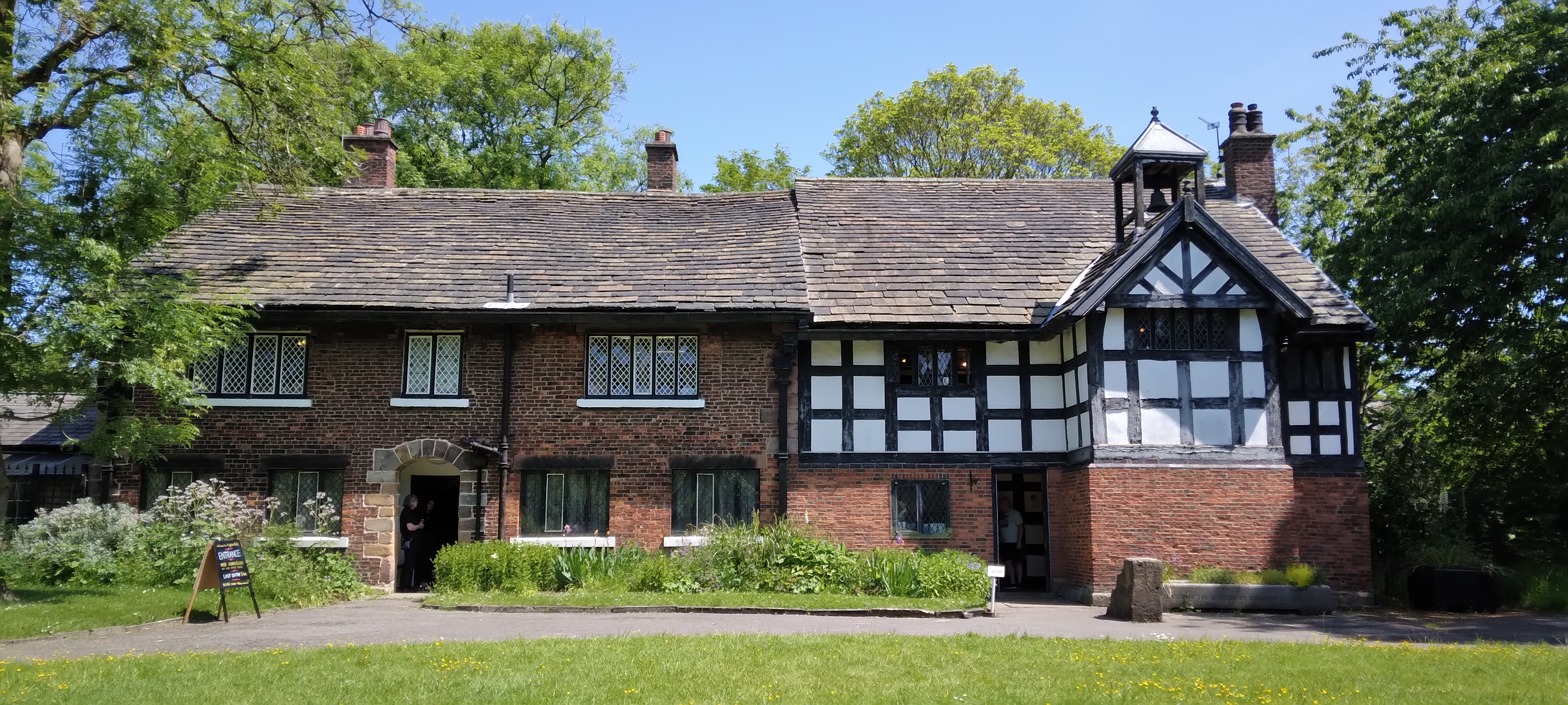
- Clayton Hall in 2023

- Location within Greater Manchester

General information
- Location: Ashton New Road, Clayton, Manchester, England
- Coordinates: 53.4837°N 2.1801°W
- Completed: 15th century
- Renovated: 16th and 17th centuries (altered); 18th century (partly rebuilt/enlarged) c. 1900 and 20th century (restored)

Technical details
- Floor count: 2

Design and construction
- Designations

Listed Building – Grade II*
- Official name: Clayton Hall
- Designated: 25 February 1952
- Reference no.: 1197795

Website
- claytonhall.org

Clayton Hall is a 15th-century manor house on Ashton New Road in Clayton, Manchester, England, hidden behind trees in a small park. The hall is a Grade II* listed building, the mound on which it is built is a scheduled ancient monument, and a rare example of a medieval moated site. The hall is surrounded by a moat, making an island 66 by 74 metres (217 by 243 ft). Alterations were made to the hall in the 16th and 17th centuries, and it was enlarged in the 18th century.

The building has Georgian and Tudor sections which form the remaining western wing of a once larger complex. The hall is reached across the moat over a listed stone bridge, thought to be dated around the late 17th century.

== History ==
The oldest section of the remaining wing of Clayton Hall was built in the 15th century on the site of a 12th-century house built for the Clayton family. When Cecilia Clayton married Robert de Byron in 1194 it passed to the Byron family, of which poet Lord Byron was a later member. The Byrons lived there for more than 400 years until they sold it for £4,700 in 1620 to London merchants, George and Humphrey Chetham, who originated from Manchester. George Chetham died in 1625, leaving his share to his brother Humphrey Chetham, who later died at the hall in 1653. Ownership then passed to his nephew, George Chetham, son of his brother James and part of Humphrey's legacy was used by his family to found Chetham's School and Library in the centre of Manchester, close to the cathedral. This had long been a dream of Humphrey's, as depicted in one of artist, Ford Madox Brown's, Manchester Murals which are held in the Great Hall of Manchester Town Hall.

George Chetham was High Sheriff in 1660 and died in 1664. In 1666, James Chetham had 18 hearths liable for hearth tax, making it the largest house in the area. Clayton Hall then passed to Edward Chetham, and from him to his sister Alice, who had married Adam Bland. Their daughter Mary married Mordecai Greene, a Spanish merchant and their only son James was MP for Arundel in 1796 and died in 1814. Clayton Hall then passed with Turton Tower, the other Chetham seat, to one of James' five daughters Arabella Penelope Eliza Greene, who had married banker Peter Richard Hoare.

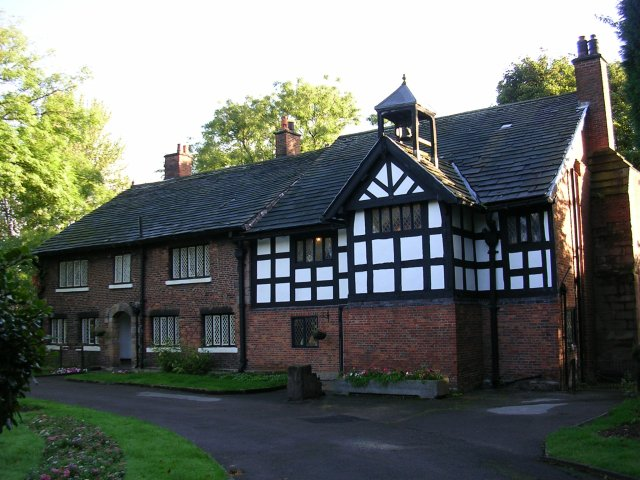
Clayton Hall in 2005

From 1863 to 1897, the hall was the rented to Lomax (1863–1867), W. H. Burns (1872–1890) and John White (1890–1897), clergy of St Cross Church. In 1897 the hall was sold by Charles A. R. Hoare to Manchester City Corporation and it was restored in 1900. The 16th-century part of the hall was rented to tenants. The 18th-century part contained the dining room, kitchen, larder, scullery and pantry. The oldest structure on the site is the sandstone bridge crossing the now empty moat. Dating from the late medieval era, it was built to replace the original wooden drawbridge.

During the Civil War, Parliamentary cavalry were stationed there, before the attack on Manchester. Afterwards, according to legend, Oliver Cromwell was said to have spent three nights there.

== Current use ==
The left-hand section of the hall was converted into a hands-on living history museum by five members of the Friends of Clayton Park volunteer group, in 2009. They eventually created six rooms, dressed in late Victorian style, to depict the latest historical period in which the hall was privately owned. There is also a textiles room devoted to vintage garments and sewing techniques, with several antique hand- and treadle-operated sewing machines. A memories room houses a large collection of local and British history materials.

The museum is currently open to the public, with free admission, on the first and third Saturday of months February though November. This includes free history talks about the hall and its owners at 12noon and 2pm.

School and group visits can be arranged, and family events take place several times a year. There is usually a small charge on these occasions, to cover costs, although some activities are free of charge.

The profits from the group's activities are used to help to preserve the hall for the future, and to enhance the visitor offer. The work of the Friends group is supported by Manchester City Council, who still own the hall and grounds, and have granted a Licence for Use to the group and continue to be responsible for the fabric of the building, with some financial input from the Charitable Trust and its donors.

The co-founders of the museum formed The Clayton Hall Living History Museum Charitable Incorporated Organisation and gained registered charity status in 2014 - Registered Charity Number 1155379.

The older, 15th-century section was incorporated into the museum in 2017 and includes a first-floor room which is dedicated to the memory of Humphrey Chetham, as was originally stipulated when the hall was sold to Manchester Corporation, and a Clayton Hall history room. There is a ground-floor Tudor tea room, also run by the Friends group, which is open on open days and other occasions throughout the year. The upper floor is reached by a spiral staircase which is housed in the belltower.

== Architecture ==
Clayton Hall was rebuilt in the 15th century with either a quadrangular plan or one with three wings. It was mostly demolished when a new house was built in the 17th century. Additions were made in the 18th century, and the hall was restored in 1900. The Grade II* listed hall is constructed in red brick with some timber framing and stone slate roofs.

The older single-depth portion has two bays on the ground floor and a front corridor, a plain doorway, and a two-light casement window. Its first floor has square-panelled timber-framing, which may originally have been jettied over the ground floor, which is now rebuilt in brick. The upper storey has three wooden mullion windows with leaded glazing. Over the central window is a jettied gable with a king post and raked struts, and on the ridge is a bellcote. The wing has a gabled stair-turret and there is a large sandstone chimney stack with a brick top on the gable wall.

The newer double-depth portion is constructed of hand-made bricks set in English garden wall bond with stone quoins. It has a doorway with a segmental quoin stone surround, and on either side are pairs of diamond-paned casement windows. There are three similar windows of different sizes on the first floor. The rainwater heads are dated 1900.

== Moated site ==
The scheduled monument is the rectangular island measuring about 66 by 74 metres (217 by 243 ft) forming the moated site of the original hall. The monument includes the site of a late 14th or early 15th-century chapel in the northwest corner that was demolished in the early 18th century. The island is accessed by a stone twin-arched bridge that replaced an earlier wooden structure. The hall and its associated buildings and infrastructure, fences, and gateposts on the northeast of the island are not scheduled, nor is the moat, which has been lined with concrete.

== See also ==
- Grade II* listed buildings in Greater Manchester
- Listed buildings in Manchester-M11
