= Ryton, Shropshire =

Village in Shropshire, England

Coordinates: 52.620°N 2.355°W

Ryton
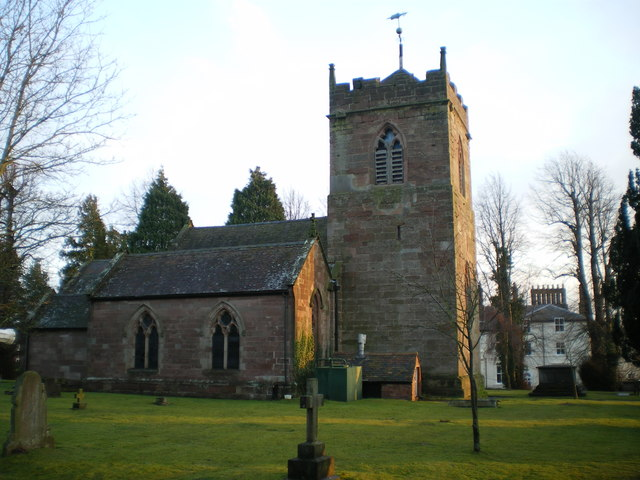
- St Andrew's Church

- Location within Shropshire
- Population: 174 (2011)
- OS grid reference: SJ760025
- Civil parish: Ryton
- Unitary authority: Shropshire
- Ceremonial county: Shropshire
- Region: West Midlands
- Country: England
- Sovereign state: United Kingdom
- Post town: Shifnal
- Postcode district: TF11
- Dialling code: 01952
- Police: West Mercia
- Fire: Shropshire
- Ambulance: West Midlands
- UK Parliament: Ludlow

Ryton is a village and civil parish in Shropshire, England, in the district of Bridgnorth. It lies about one mile north north west of Beckbury.

It is not to be confused with the small village of Great Ryton, which also is in Shropshire, in the parish of Condover, south of Shrewsbury.

== History ==
The civil parish originates during Norman times, and appears as "Ruitone" in the Domesday Book of 1086. Ryton was part of the Saxon parish of Shifnal, but became separate at some point during the 12th century because there is mention of a priest at Ryton named Bernard in 1186.

In 1643 John Craven was created Baron Craven of Ryton, named after this village, but the title died out with his death in 1648.

Ryton is home to St Andrew's church, in which records first appear of its existence in 1710

Ryton Hall, built by Romolo Piazzani, was for a time an independent boarding school for girls, from 1954 to 1983 an ESN school run by Wolverhampton Borough Council, and is now apartments with houses built in the garden.

== Population ==
In 1801, the recorded population of Ryton was 160, with 81 males and 79 females. Between 1801 and 1861 the population rose to 264, with 163 of these being male. However, there was no steady, consistent rise to the population, instead there were a number of periods where it actually dropped, for example between 1811 and 1821 the population dropped from 170 to 131. Another example is between 1881 and 1901, where the population dropped from 212 to 121. In 2001, the total population stood at 156, with 82 being male. Being a location with such a small population, it is perhaps no surprise that there are very large changes in the percentage of population, as it would not have taken a lot of people to make a large change. Interesting to note that the time in which Ryton's population increases the most, is at a time when England and Wales' decline, which also falls at the time of World War I. The population density of Ryton is a much lower population density compared to the average of England and Wales, which is expected due to its rural location. England and Wales show a steady increase in population density, whereas Ryton hardly changed at all between 1880 and 1960.

Population Graph of Ryton

== Industry ==
Historically, the majority of the working population of Ryton have worked in agriculture, unsurprising considering the rural location. In 1831, 30 out of 53 economically active males aged over 20 worked as agricultural labourers. This therefore gives us an idea of the social status of the majority of people at this time, as the vast majority of people were either a labourer or a servant. In 1881, with economically active males again agriculture is the most common sector. With females however, the most common is of an unknown occupation, followed closely by domestic service or offices. In more recent times however, employment is more evenly split, with 30 working in the Extractive and Manufacturing industries, and 43 working in the service industries.

== Housing ==
Between 1831 and 1961 there was only an increase of 14 households in Ryton, signalling that there was not a great deal of change or development in the area. The biggest increase seen was between 1931 and 1951, with 17 new houses built, possibly due to post war development. Another point which re-emphasises the lack of development in Ryton, is that between 1831 and 1961 there were no houses under construction. During the same time, the vast majority of houses were occupied, with vacant houses peaking at only 7 in 1901, suggesting a very stable community. In 2001, the total dwelling count stood at 57, with no vacant household spaces and an average household size of 2.84 people.

== St. Andrew's Church ==
Although there is evidence of medieval stonework within the church, the first record dates back to 1710, in which a tablet in the tower wall commemorates the church wardens who possibly were responsible for the building of the tower.

Originally there were three bells, but then a further two were added in 1887 to mark Queen Victoria's 50th Jubilee, and a sixth bell was added in 1993. The font is unusual, in that it is recessed into the tower arch and the style of its carved decorations suggests that it is a 14th-century creation. There is one war memorial, a plaque to Major Wilfred Bernard Foster who died of wounds in Burma in 1945.

The Reverend Robert William Eyton (1815–1881), author of The Antiquities of Shropshire, was Rector at Ryton for 22 years, during which period he researched this work, published in 1860.

Colonel William Kenyon-Slaney (1847–1908), sportsman and politician, whose family home, Hatton Grange, is in the parish, is buried in the churchyard.

The Italian Romolo Piazzani is also buried here. He is credited with building Ryton Hall, and as well as being a landscape gardener, he has a portrait in a private collection in Montrose, Scotland.

== See also ==
- Listed buildings in Ryton, Shropshire
