= James Prince Lee =

British schoolmaster, clergyman and bishop (1804–69)

The Right Reverend James Prince Lee FRS
- Bishop of Manchester
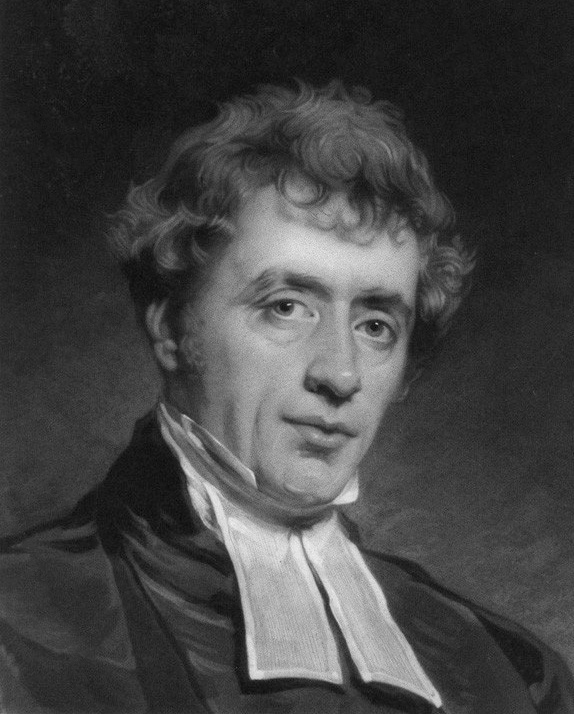
- Mezzotint by Thomas Lupton (after a contemporary portrait by Sir John Watson Gordon)
- Diocese: Manchester
- Elected: 11 November 1847
- Installed: 11 February 1848
- Term ended: 24 December 1869
- Successor: James Fraser

Orders
- Ordination: 1830
- Consecration: 23 January 1848

Personal details
- Born: 28 July 1804 London
- Died: 24 December 1869 (aged 65) Mauldeth Hall, Lancashire
- Buried: Heaton Mersey churchyard
- Denomination: Church of England
- Residence: Mauldeth Hall
- Parents: Stephen and Sarah Lee
- Spouse: Susannah Penrice
- Children: Two daughters: Sophia; Susannah
- Education: St Paul's School, London; University of Cambridge (MA, DDiv)

James Prince Lee FRS (28 July 1804 – 24 December 1869) was an English clergyman and who served as headmaster of King Edward's School, Birmingham, and the first Bishop of Manchester.

== Early life and education ==
Born in London, Lee was educated at St Paul's School, London, and University of Cambridge, where he studied Classics as an undergraduate student of Trinity College, Cambridge, graduating with a Bachelor of Arts (BA) degree in 1828; this was promoted by seniority to Master of Arts (MA) in 1831 and in 1861 he was awarded a Doctor of Divinity (DDiv) degree.

== Career ==
After his ordination into the Church of England priesthood in 1830, Lee served as an assistant schoolmaster at Rugby School under Thomas Arnold, who thought highly of him. In 1837, he became rector of Ayot St Peter, Hertfordshire, and in 1838 headmaster of King Edward's School, Birmingham, where he had among his pupils Edward Burne-Jones, Richard Watson Dixon, Edward White Benson, Joseph Barber Lightfoot, and Brooke Foss Westcott. There is also a house of the school named after him. In 1847 he was appointed as an honorary canon of Worcester Cathedral.

=== Episcopal career ===
On 23 October 1847, Lee was nominated as the first bishop of the newly constituted Anglican Diocese of Manchester by Queen Victoria, on the advice of the prime minister of the day, Lord John Russell. His election took place on 17 November 1847, followed by consecration on 23 January 1848, and enthronement at Manchester Cathedral on 11 February 1848. He was elected a member of the Manchester Literary and Philosophical Society on 17 April 1849.

Lee's schoolmasterly manner was an irritation to his clergy. However, he carried out substantial work in church extension. During his twenty-one years' tenure of the see, he consecrated 130 churches. He was elected a Fellow of the Royal Society (FRS) in 1849. He took a foremost part in founding the Manchester free library in 1852, and bequeathed his own valuable collection of books to Owens College.

== Personal life ==
Lee married Susannah, elder daughter of George Penrice, of Elmbridge, Worcestershire, on 25 December 1830, and they had two daughters.

Lee died at his home, Mauldeth Hall, Stockport, in 1869, and was buried in the graveyard of St. John the Baptist Church in Heaton Mersey next to Stella Maris School. His memorial sermon was preached by Edward Benson (subsequently Archbishop of Canterbury) and was published with biographical details by J. F. Wickenden and others.

== Bibliography ==
- Fryde, E. B.; Greenway, D. E.; Porter, S.; Roy, I., eds. (1986). Handbook of British Chronology (3rd, reprinted 2003 ed.). Cambridge: Cambridge University Press. ISBN 0-521-56350-X.
- Horn, J. M.; Smith, D. M.; Mussett, P. (2004). "Bishop of Manchester". Fasti Ecclesiae Anglicanae 1541-1857. Vol. 11, Carlisle, Chester, Durham, Manchester, Ripon, and Sodor and Man Dioceses. London: Institute of Historical Research – via British History Online.

Attribution

- This article incorporates text from a publication now in the public domain: Chisholm, Hugh, ed. (1911). "Lee, James Prince". Encyclopædia Britannica. Vol. 16 (11th ed.). Cambridge University Press. p. 136.
