= William Macmichael =

English physician and medical biographer

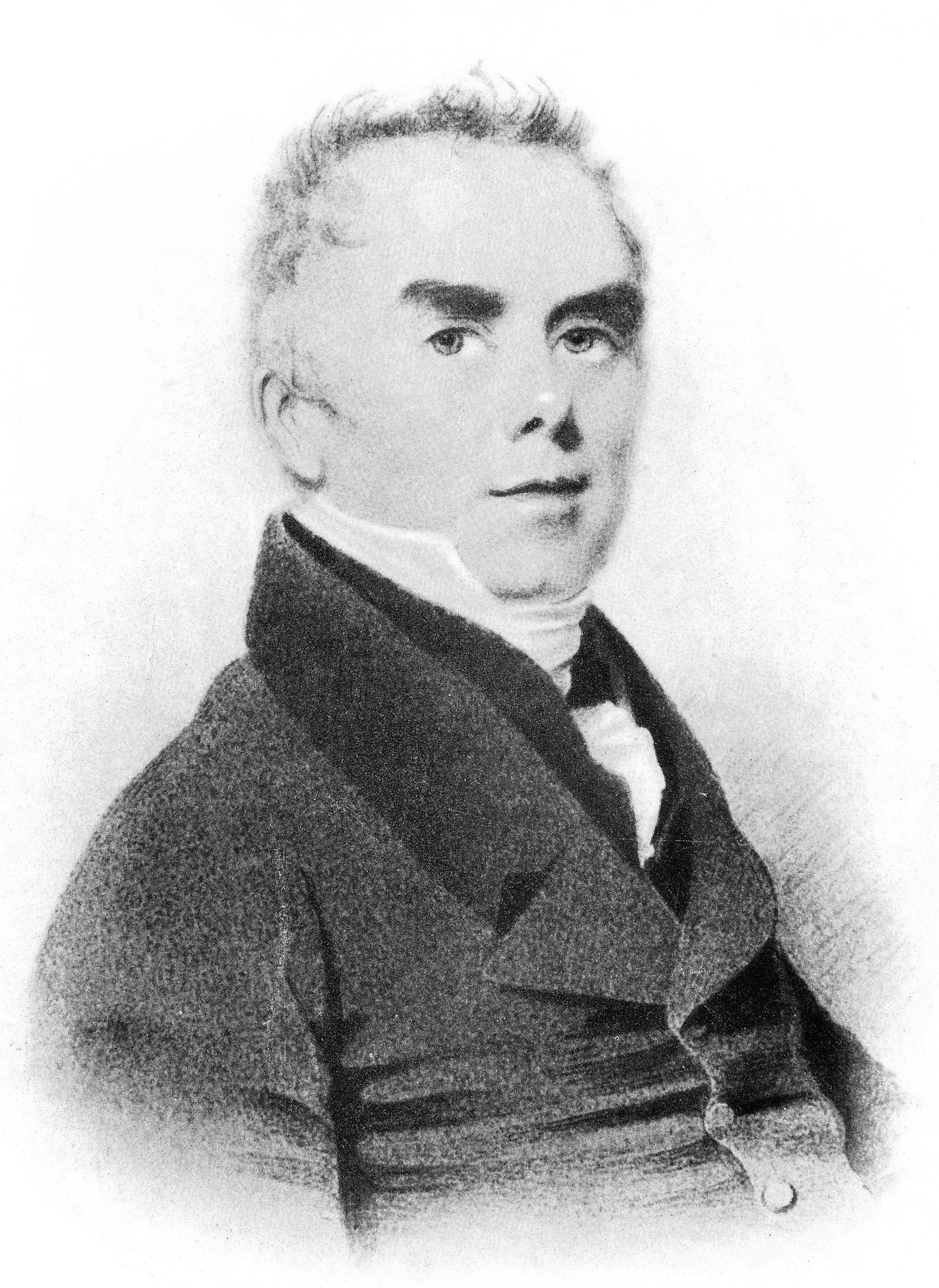
William Macmichael in 1823

William Macmichael FRS (30 November 1783 – 10 January 1839) was an English physician and medical biographer, remembered as the author of The Gold-Headed Cane (1827).

== Life and career ==
William Macmichael was born on 30 November 1783 in Bridgnorth, Shropshire. He was educated at Bridgnorth Grammar School. In 1800 he went up to Christ Church, Oxford, with a scholarship. Macmichael spent the years from 1811 to 1817 visiting Bulgaria, Greece, Palestine, Romania, Russia and Turkey after gaining a Radcliffe traveling fellowship. Macmichael gained an MD from Oxford, and became a fellow of both the Royal Society and of the Royal College of Physicians. Macmaichael served as censor for the Royal College of Physicians, as a physician to the Middlesex Hospital, registrar at the Royal College of Physicians, and adviser to the President of the Royal College of Physicians. In 1829 Macmichael was appointed physician extraordinary to King George IV, became librarian to the King in 1830, and became physician in ordinary to King William IV in 1831. Between 1833 and 1835 Macmichael was an Inspector General of Lunatic Asylums. Macmichael died aged 55 in 1839 following his retirement through ill-health.

Macmichael's A Journey from Moscow to Constantinople in the Years 1817, 1818 was published in 1819. Macmichael's A New View of the Infection of Scarlet Fever: Illustrated by Remarks on other Contagious Disorders was published in 1822. Macmichael's The Gold-Headed Cane was published anonymously in 1827 with biographies of the owners of a cane carried by John Radcliffe, Richard Mead, Anthony Askew, William Pitcairn and Matthew Baillie. Macmichael's The Lives of British Physicians was published anonymously in 1830 including biographies of William Harvey, Thomas Linacre and John Caius.
