= Robert Eyton (priest, died 1908) =

Anglican priest (1845–1908)

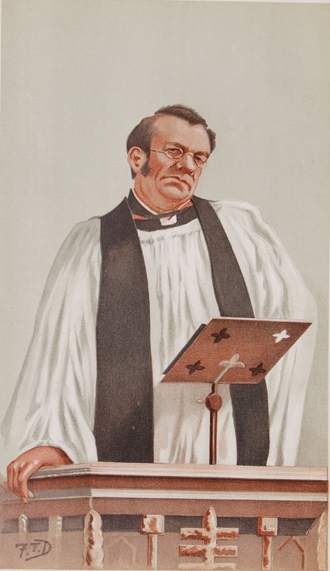
Robert Eyton ("A fashionable Canon") in Vanity Fair, 1898

Robert Eyton (21 June 1845 – 7 August 1908) was an Anglican priest, Rector of St Margaret's, Westminster from 1895 to 1899.

The second son of Robert William Eyton, Robert Eyton was educated at Shrewsbury School and Christ Church, Oxford, matriculating in 1864 aged 19, graduating B.A. 1869 (M.A. 1872), and was ordained in 1870.

He became Sub-Almoner to the Queen (1883), Rector of Upper Chelsea (1884), a prebendary of St Paul's Cathedral (1885), and was appointed a Canon of Westminster Abbey and Rector of St Margaret's, Westminster in December 1895.

In January 1899, Eyton resigned suddenly. Although his obituary later gave the cause as "complete breakdown under mental strain," this is believed to be due to a homosexuality scandal. He emigrated to Australia in 1900 as Rector of Charleville, Queensland, and was appointed Examining Chaplain to the Bishop of Bathurst in 1903.

Having fallen ill after mistakenly taking liniment instead of cough mixture, he died on 7 August 1908, aged 63, in Bathurst, New South Wales.
