= St Leonard's Church, Bridgnorth =

Coordinates: 52.5371°N 2.4187°W

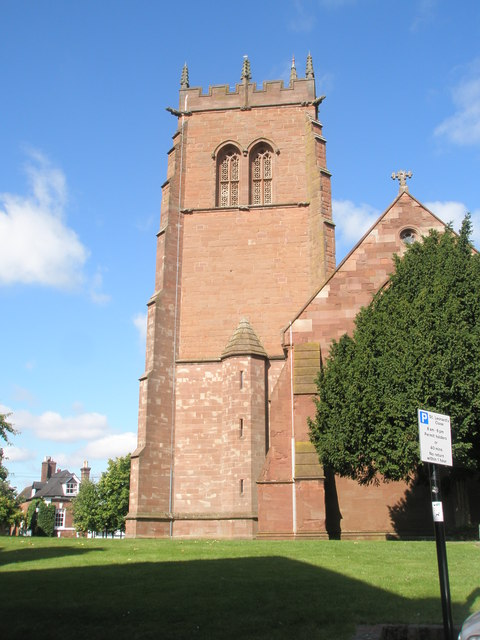
- Tower of St Leonard's Church, Bridgnorth

- Location in Shropshire
- OS grid reference: SO 716,933
- Location: Bridgnorth, Shropshire
- Country: England
- Denomination: Anglican
- Website: Churches Conservation Trust

History
- Dedication: Saint Leonard

Architecture
- Functional status: Redundant
- Heritage designation: Grade II*
- Designated: 18 July 1949
- Architect(s): Thomas Rickman; F. J. Francis; Slater and Carpenter
- Architectural type: Church
- Style: Gothic, Gothic Revival
- Completed: 1878

Specifications
- Materials: Sandstone, roofs of clay tiles

St Leonard's Church is a redundant Anglican church in Bridgnorth, Shropshire, England. It is recorded in the National Heritage List for England as a designated Grade II* listed building, and is under the care of the Churches Conservation Trust.

== History ==
The present church originated in the 12th century. There is no mention of a church at Bridgnorth in the Domesday Book, but it is likely that there was an earlier church on the site because Anglo-Saxon and Norman stonework has been incorporated into the fabric of the present church. A tower was added to it in 1448. During the Civil War the Roundheads used the north aisle of the church to store ammunition, and this was ignited by a shot from a cannon in 1646. As a result, the north aisle and the eastern part of the south aisle were destroyed. The roof of the nave was rebuilt in 1662, but the aisles were not fully restored at that time. In 1826 the chancel was repaired by Thomas Rickman, and it was further restored in 1846–47 by F. J. Francis. A major reconstruction of the church was undertaken from 1860 by W. Slater and R. H. Carpenter. They rebuilt the church in Geometrical style rather than in the Perpendicular style of the earlier church. In 1870–73 Slater and Carpenter substantially rebuilt the tower, this time in Perpendicular style. An octagonal library was added to the north side of the chancel in 1878. By the 1970s the tower had become unsafe, and in 1976 the church was declared redundant. It was vested in the Churches Conservation Trust in 1980.

== Architecture ==
=== Exterior ===
St Leonard's is constructed in local red Bunter sandstone, and has clay tile roofs. Its plan consists of a rectangle comprising a five-bay nave with north and south aisles (the south aisle is one bay shorter) under separate roofs, a three-bay chancel with a roof at a lower level, a tower outside the west bay of the south aisle, and an octagonal library to the north of the chancel. The tower is in three stages separated by string courses, with diagonal buttresses, and a northwest polygonal stair turret with a crocketted spirelet. Its lower stage contains the entrance to the church through a south doorway leading into a porch. Above this is a large five-light window. In the middle stage is a statue of Saint Leonard in a niche. The top stage contains paired two-light bell openings. The parapet is embattled with eight crocketted pinnacles. Most of the windows in the aisles have three lights. At the west end of the nave is a doorway above which is a pair of three-light windows. The south wall of the chancel has three three-light windows, the central one being shorter and over a priest's door. The east window has four lights. On the north wall of the chancel are two windows, a squint, and a link to the library. The library has a pyramidal roof, and simple two-light mullioned windows, alternating with tall two-light dormers.

=== Interior ===
Inside the church there is a five-bay north arcade and a four-bay south arcade. The arcades are carried on circular piers with capitals carved with foliage by S. Poole. On the south side, one of the bays is divided by a pier. This has a carving of the Expulsion from Eden on its capital, and in the tympanum of the main arch is a carving in a roundel of the Annunciation to the shepherds; both are by James Redfern. In south wall of the chancel is a double piscina and a stepped sedilia. There are hammerbeam roofs in the nave, the south aisle, and the chancel. The north aisle has a tie-beam roof, and there is a lierne vault in the base of the tower. The walls of the nave and aisles are covered in red-brown plaster, while those in the tower and chancel are bare. The nave is floored with red and black tiles, with raised wooden floors under the pews. The chancel floor contains memorial mosaics and tiles, while the sanctuary has encaustic tiles.

The font is octagonal, standing on marble shafts, with carved marble figures under canopies; it dates from 1894 and is by Thomas Earp. The font has a tall timber cover with pinnacles by J. Phillips of Liverpool dating from 1991. The polygonal wooden pulpit, made by James Forsyth in 1862, stands on a large stone base. It is carved with foliage and a roundel with Christ teaching his apostles. The elm lectern of 1929 is also by Phillips, and represents an angel with a trumpet. The reredos of 1882 was designed by R. H. Carpenter and carved by Earp. In the centre is the Crucifixion, and on the sides are gabled niches with figures of the four Doctors of the Church. At the east end of the south aisle is a chapel with a reredos designed by Charles Spooner for the Guild of Handicraft in 1898, containing a painting of Christ administering Holy Communion by Frank Smallpeice. Also in the south aisle, and again of 1898, are a copper cross and candlesticks by Bainbridge Reynolds in Arts and Crafts style.

Much of the stained glass in the church is by Clayton and Bell. This includes the east window of 1876, which depicts the Te Deum. This window was a memorial to Thomas Rowley, headmaster of Bridgnorth Grammar School. Other glass by Clayton and Bell is in the windows in the south aisle of 1874 depicting saints, in the tower of 1873 showing subjects relating to baptism, and in the north aisle of between 1879 and 1908 depicting historical figures of the Church of England. In the chancel, a window of 1873 in the north wall of 1873 is by William Done and shows the Good Samaritan, and in the south wall is a window of about 1847 by William Wailes which represents the Canticles. Also in the church are a number of memorials. In the north wall of the chancel is a monument in Baroque style to Francis Wheeler who died in 1686, and next to it is one to Sarah Wheeler who had died during the previous year. In the south aisle is a brass plaque to William Francis Oldham who died in 1899, and a memorial to Frank Smallpeice who died in 1904. Also in the south aisle are four cast iron ledgers containing dates of death between 1679 and 1707. In the north aisle is a plaque to Lieutenant-Colonel Harold Echaloz Welch (killed in action in France 1918) and in the south aisle a wooden shrine of English oak, surmounted by a representation of the Crucifixion of Christ, by Robert Bridgman and Sons of Lichfield, erected in 1922 as the parish's First World War memorial. There is a ring of eight bells. Five of these were cast in 1681 by Thomas Roberts, and the other three are by John Warner & Sons, two are dated 1874 and the other one is dated 1895.

== See also ==
- List of churches preserved by the Churches Conservation Trust in the English Midlands
