= St Willibrord's Church, Clayton =

Church in Clayton, Greater Manchester, England

St Willibrord's Church
- St Willibrord's Church
- 53°29′08″N 2°10′38″W
- Location: North Road, Clayton, Greater Manchester, England
- Denomination: Roman Catholic
- Website: holyspiritparishmanchester.org/st-willibrords-church

Architecture
- Functional status: Active
- Heritage designation: Grade II listed building
- Architect(s): Norris & Reynolds
- Style: Byzantine Revival
- Years built: 1937–1938

Administration
- Diocese: Salford

St. WIllibrord's R.C. Church, Clayton is a Grade II listed Roman Catholic church in Clayton, Greater Manchester, England. It was constructed between 1937 and 1938, on North Road.

The parish functions under the jurisdiction of the Roman Catholic Diocese of Salford.

== Origins ==
The St Willibrord Parish was founded in 1906 in a small plot of land in Clayton, Manchester. It was founded by Father Sassen. The Reverend/Father at the time was Fr. Patrick Dillon.

== Construction ==
The church was designed by Norris & Reynolds in a Byzantine style. Construction was begun in 1937 and ended in the following year.
