= Ralph Lingen, 1st Baron Lingen =

English civil servant (1819-1905)

The Right Honourable The Lord Lingen KCB
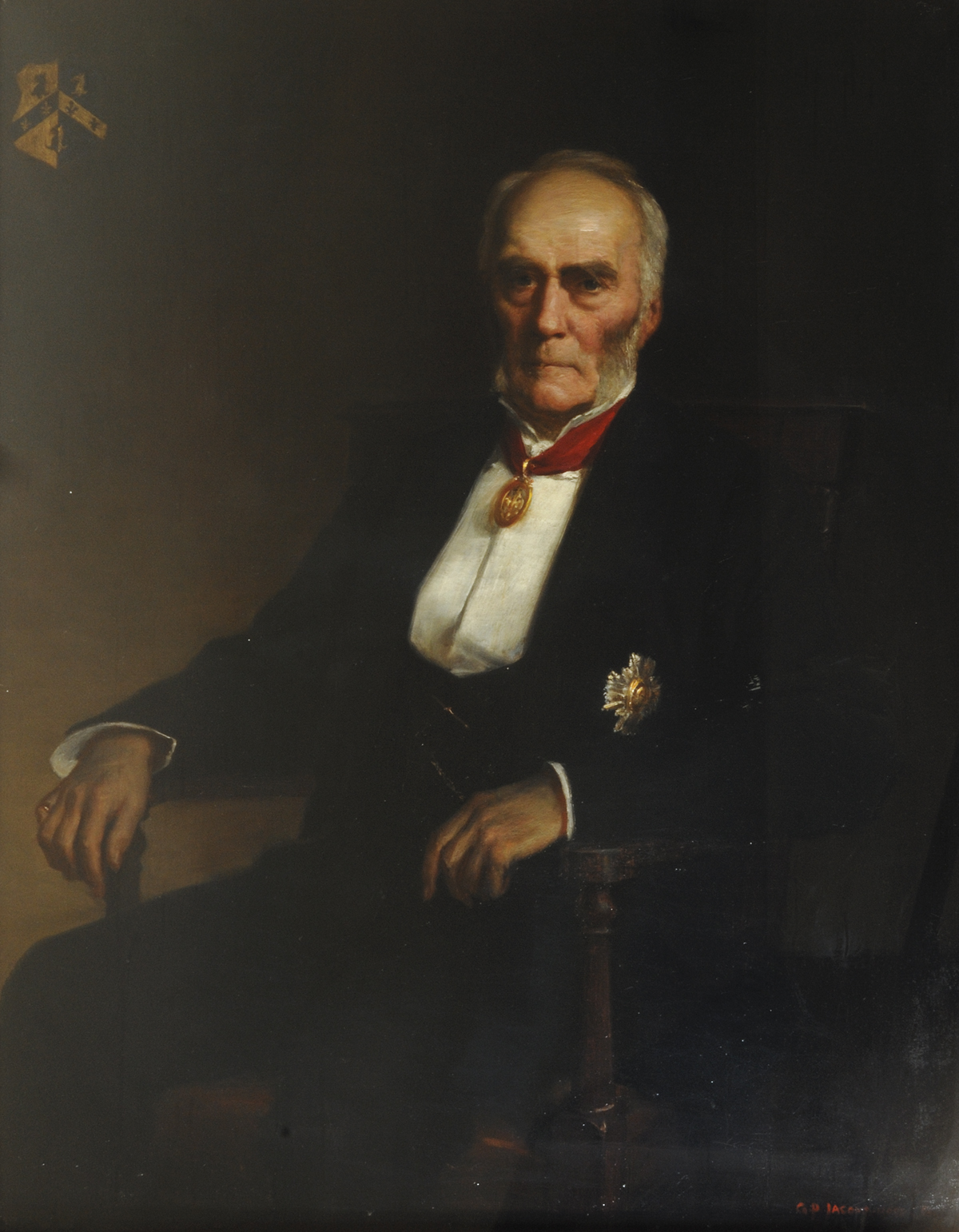
- Ralph Robert Wheeler, Lord Lingen, by George Percy Jacomb-Hood, 1896

Permanent Secretary to the Treasury
- In office 1869–1885
- Preceded by: George Alexander Hamilton
- Succeeded by: Sir Reginald Welby & Sir Edward Hamilton

Personal details
- Born: 19 December 1819
- Died: 22 July 1905 (aged 85)
- Occupation: civil servant

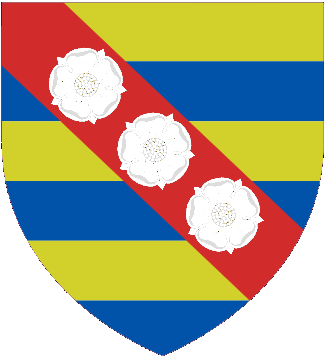
Arms:Barry of six Or and Azure on a bend Gules three roses Argent. Motto: Dominus Provide It

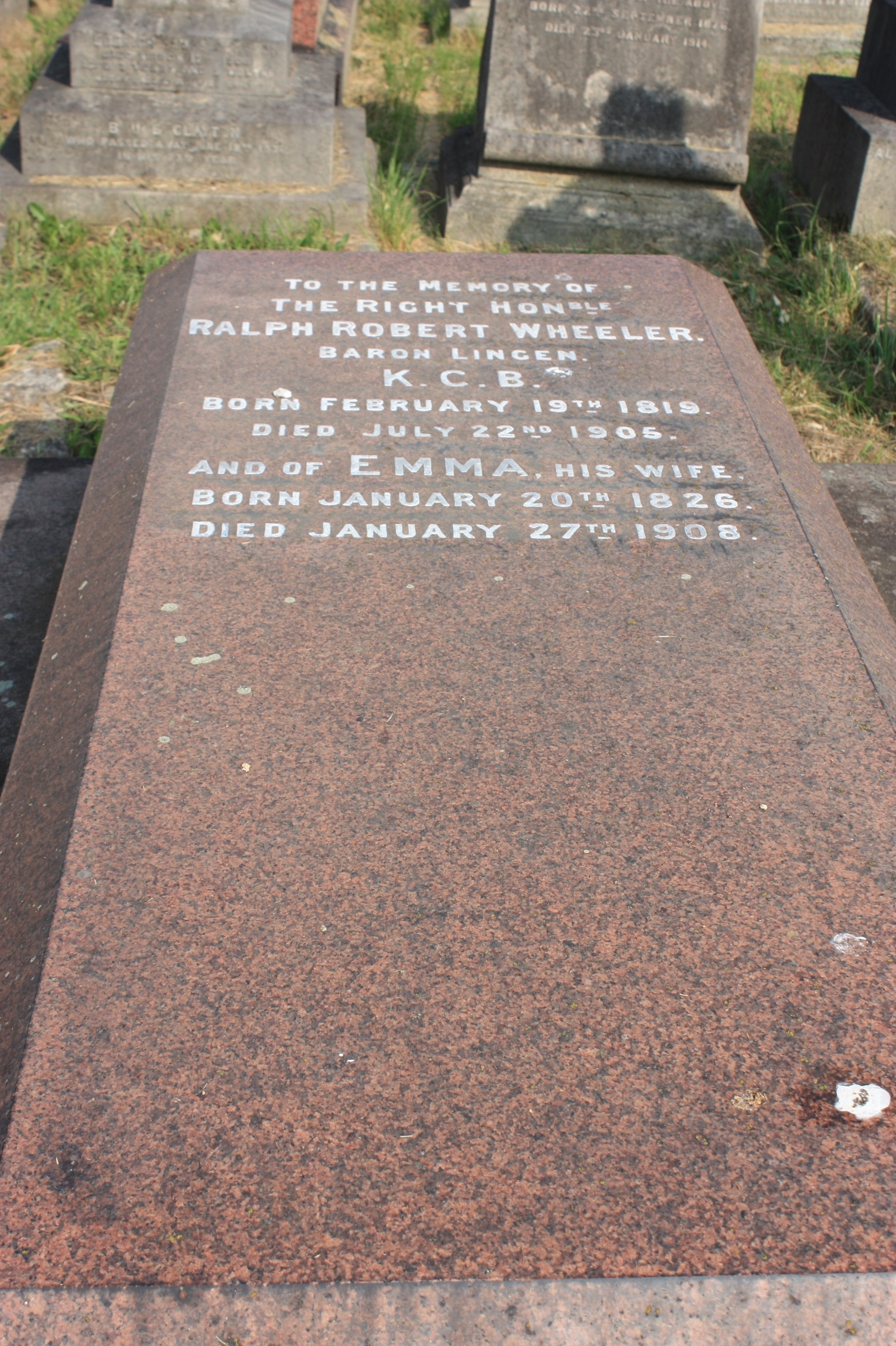
The grave of Baron Lingen, Brompton Cemetery

Ralph Robert Wheeler Lingen, 1st Baron Lingen KCB (19 December 1819 – 22 July 1905) was an English civil servant.

== Background and education ==
Lingen was born in Birmingham, where his father was in business. He was the grandson of Ralph Lingen, Fellow of Wadham College, Oxford, and was a descendant of Elisabeth de Burgh (d. 1522). Lingen was first educated at Bridgnorth Grammar School and then became a scholar of Trinity College, Oxford, in 1837. He won the Ireland (1838) and Hertford (1839) scholarships; and after taking a first-class in Literae Humaniores (1840), was elected a fellow of Balliol (1841). He subsequently won the Chancellor's Latin Essay (1843) and the Eldon Law Scholarship (1846).

== Career ==
After teaching as an assistant master at Rugby School he entered the Inns of Court as a Barrister at Lincoln's Inn. He was called to the bar in 1847; but instead of practising as a barrister, he accepted an appointment in the Education Office. It was in this role that he became involved with the 1847 Blue Books episode in 1847-8 within which his disdain of the Welsh became apparent.

After a short period he was chosen in 1849 to succeed Sir James Kay-Shuttleworth as its secretary or chief permanent official. He retained this position till 1869. The Education Office of that day had to administer a somewhat chaotic system of government grants to local schools, and Lingen was conspicuous for his fearless discrimination and rigid economy, qualities which characterized his whole career. When Robert Lowe (Lord Sherbrooke) became, as vice-president of the council, his parliamentary chief, Lingen worked congenially with him in producing the Revised Code of 1862 which incorporated "payment by results"; but the education department encountered adverse criticism, and in 1864 the vote of censure in parliament which caused Lowe's resignation, founded (but erroneously) on an alleged "editing" of the school inspectors' reports, was inspired by a certain antagonism to Lingen's as well as to Lowe's methods.

Shortly before the introduction of Forster's Education Act of 1870, Lingen was transferred to the post of permanent secretary of the treasury. In this office, which he held till 1885, he proved a most efficient guardian of the public purse, and he was a tower of strength to successive chancellors of the exchequer. It used to be said that the best recommendation for a secretary of the treasury was to be able to say "No" so disagreeably that nobody would court a repetition. Lingen was at all events a most successful resister of importunate claims, and his undoubted talents as a financier were most prominently displayed in the direction of parsimony. In 1885 he retired. He had been made a CB in 1869 and a KCB in 1878, and on his retirement he was raised to the peerage as Baron Lingen, of Lingen in the County of Hereford. In 1889 he was made one of the first aldermen of the new London County Council, but he resigned in 1892 with increasing deafness. His portrait contains the heraldic arms of Trinity College and not his personal arms which are recorded in Burke's Peerage and around his neck hangs his KCB order of knighthood.

== Personal life ==
In 1852 Lord Lingen married Emma Hutton (1826-1908), daughter of Robert Hutton. There were no children from the marriage. He died on 22 July 1905, aged 85, and was buried in Brompton Cemetery, London. The grave lies on the western side of the central enclosed roundel. The peerage died with him.

Lady Emma Lingen died in January 1908 and is buried with him.

== Notes ==
Attribution

Government offices
Preceded by Sir James Kay-Shuttleworth, Bt	Under-Secretary of State for the Committee of Council on Education; 1849–1869	Succeeded by Sir Francis Sandford
Preceded by George Alexander Hamilton	Permanent Secretary to the Treasury; 1869–1885	Succeeded by Sir Reginald Welby
Preceded by George Alexander Hamilton	Permanent Secretary to the Treasury; 1869–1885	Succeeded by Sir Edward Hamilton
Peerage of the United Kingdom
New creation	Baron Lingen; 1885–1905	Extinct
Political offices
Preceded by New position	Chairman of the Finance Committee of London County Council; 1889–1892	Succeeded by Evan Spicer
