= Easthampstead =

Suburb of Bracknell, Berkshire, England

Coordinates: 51.40443°N 0.75640°W

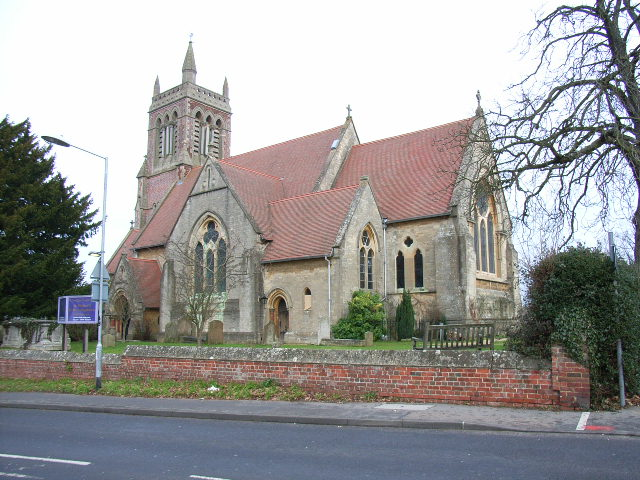
- St Michael and St Mary Magdalene

- Location within Berkshire
- OS grid reference: SU866680
- Civil parish: Bracknell
- Unitary authority: Bracknell Forest
- Ceremonial county: Berkshire
- Region: South East
- Country: England
- Sovereign state: United Kingdom
- Post town: BRACKNELL
- Postcode district: RG12
- Dialling code: 01344
- Police: Thames Valley
- Fire: Royal Berkshire
- Ambulance: South Central
- UK Parliament: Bracknell

Easthampstead is a former village and now a southern suburb of the town of Bracknell, in the civil parish of Bracknell, in the Bracknell Forest district, in the ceremonial county of Berkshire, England. The old village can still be easily identified around the Church of St Michael and St Mary Magdalene. This building houses some of the finest stained glass works of Sir Edward Burne-Jones.

== History ==
In Easthampstead there is evidence of local Bronze Age existence in the form of a large round barrow on the top of Bill Hill. The hill itself is also surrounded by an ancient ditch, which has largely been filled in. Bill Hill now forms part of a park next to Downshire Way and it is a Scheduled Ancient Monument.

Easthampsted is mentioned as an entry in the Domesday Book of 1086 as land belonging to the abbey of Westminster St. Peter in the hundred of Ripplesmere. It was a small village of 14 villagers and 8 ploughlands, and had a value of £5 in 1066. By 1070 it was only worth £2.5.

Originally Easthampstead was an important parish in Windsor Forest, its manor house at Easthampstead Park being a popular hunting lodge with the Royal Family. Another large and important house in the old parish is South Hill Park, one time home of Prime Minister George Canning. Still older is Caesar's Camp, the only Iron Age hill fort in East Berkshire.

Easthampstead once had its own Rural District. In 1971 the parish had a population of 209. On 1 April 1984 the parish was abolished and merged with Binfield, Bracknell, Crowthorne and Winkfield.

== Sport and leisure ==
Easthampstead also sports some of Bracknell's more interesting features such as the Bracknell Sports and Leisure centre.
