= Robert William Eyton =

British writer (1815–1881)

Robert William Eyton (21 December 1815 – 8 September 1881) was an English Church of England clergyman who was author of The Antiquities of Shropshire.

== Life and career ==
Robert William Eyton was born in 1815. He was the son of Reverend John Eyton of Wellington, where he was born in his father's vicarage, and Eyton in Shropshire. He lived part of his childhood at Tong, Shropshire and was educated at Bridgnorth Grammar School and Rugby School under Thomas Arnold, then went up to Christ Church, Oxford.

Ordained priest in 1839, Eyton went on to become the rector at Ryton, Shropshire, where he served for 22 years.

Eyton married Mary Watts in 1839. Eyton died on 8 September 1881 aged 65. His son Robert Eyton became a Canon of Westminster in 1895.

Eyton is remembered as author of The Antiquities of Shropshire, researched during his time at Ryton and published, at a rate of about two large volumes annually, from 1854 until 1860.

== Antiquities of Shropshire ==
- Volume 1 (1854) (Google)
- Volume 2 (1855) (Google)
- Volume 3 (1856) (Google)
- Volume 4 (1857) (Google)
- Volume 5 (1857) (Google)
- Volume 6 (1858) (Google)
- Volume 7 (1858) (Google)
- Volume 8 (1859) (Google)
- Volume 9 (1859) (Google)
- Volume 10 (1860) (Google)
- Volume 11 (1860) (Google)
- Volume 12 (1860) (Google)
