= James Fraser (bishop) =

English Anglican bishop (1818–1885)

The Right Reverend James Fraser
- Bishop of Manchester
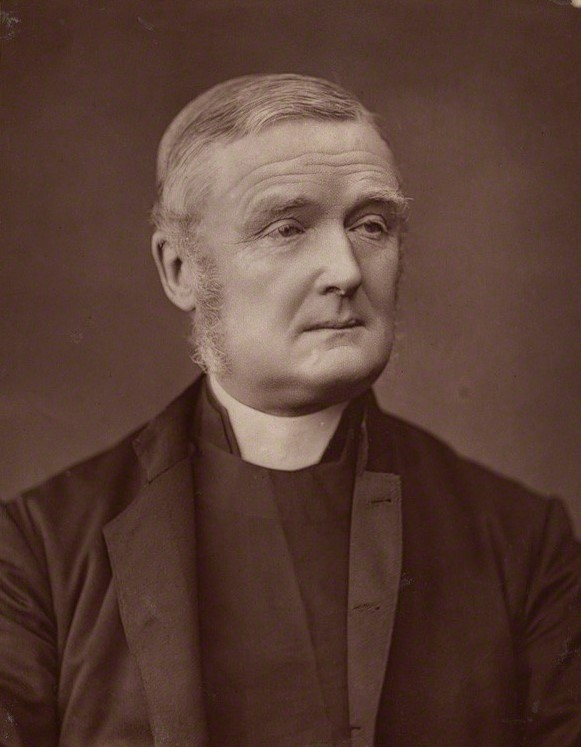
- James Fraser
- Diocese: Manchester
- Installed: 25 March 1870
- Term ended: 22 October 1885
- Predecessor: James Prince Lee
- Successor: James Moorhouse

Orders
- Ordination: 1847
- Consecration: 25 March 1870

Personal details
- Born: 18 August 1818 Prestbury, Gloucestershire, England
- Died: 22 October 1885 (aged 67) Manchester, Lancashire, England
- Buried: Ufton Nervet, Berkshire
- Denomination: Church of England
- Spouse: Agnes Ellen Frances Duncan
- Education: Bridgnorth Grammar School; Shrewsbury School; Lincoln College, Oxford

James Fraser (18 August 1818 – 22 October 1885) was a reforming Anglican bishop of Manchester, England. An able Church administrator and policy leader, he was active in developing the Church's approach to education and in practical politics and industrial relations. Though his views were ecumenical and he was respected within a wide variety of religions, he became involved in contentious litigation under the Public Worship Regulation Act 1874.

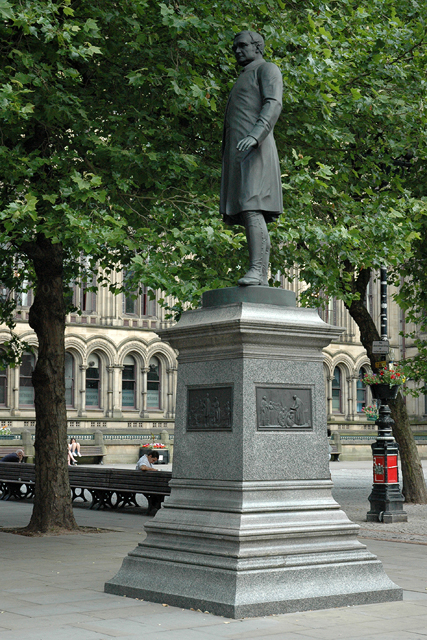
Grade II listed statue by Thomas Woolner in Albert Square, Manchester

== Early life ==
Born in Prestbury, Gloucestershire, Fraser's father was an unsuccessful merchant who left his wife and seven children in penury when he died in 1832. Fraser was brought up by his grandfather in Bilston, Staffordshire, then at various schools, including Bridgnorth Grammar School. He finished his education at Shrewsbury School and then Lincoln College, Oxford, where he graduated in 1839. His limited funds and the continual competition for bursaries entailed a scholastic life only relieved by his passion for athletics. He loved horses and hunting but found it difficult to finance the lifestyle.

Elected a fellow of Oriel College, Oxford, in 1840, he worked tutoring and in the library before taking deacon's orders in 1846 and giving up his passion for hunting. After some parochial work in Oxford, he was ordained a priest in 1847 before becoming rector of Cholderton, Wiltshire. He continued his educational work as a tutor and as occasional examiner.

In 1858, he served on the Royal Commission on education and in 1860 became rector of Ufton Nervet, Berkshire, soon establishing a reputation as an able church manager. He travelled to the United States and Canada in 1865 on a commission to examine education there and his insightful report enhanced his reputation as a social analyst and leader of church opinion. Though he was offered the post of Bishop of Calcutta he turned it down. In 1867 he was appointed by the Home Secretary to a commission on child labour in agriculture and further enhanced his reputation in policy development.

== Bishop of Manchester ==
Respect for his knowledge of educational matters led Prime Minister William Ewart Gladstone to appoint him Bishop of Manchester and he was consecrated on 25 March 1870 (Lady Day) at Manchester Cathedral. The Anglican Diocese of Manchester was still comparatively new and its only former bishop, James Prince Lee, had done little to develop its infrastructure. Fraser set to work to remedy this with a programme of consecrating 99 new churches and establishment of a bureaucratic structure including, of course, a Board of Education.

== Politics and arbitration ==
Bishop Fraser's opponents said of him that, "Omnipresence was his forte, and omniscience his foible", reflecting his restless activity in preaching the gospel, reform and activity in civil society. He was a common sight on the streets of Manchester, hurrying to address workers of all kinds several times a day. He was a vocal opponent of Charles Darwin’s ideas and in an address of 1871 said that they were, “merely guesses, conjectures, and inferences resting upon remote analogies”. He was governor of many educational institutions including Manchester Grammar School and Owens College. In 1874 he began a career as an arbitrator, working to resolve conflict in a number of strikes. He was an early enthusiast for and advocate of the cooperative movement. He served as President of the first day of the 1878 Co-operative Congress.

== Doctrine and litigation ==
Never overly-interested in theology, Fraser was a liberal in matters of worship who favoured the old high church school, though with little sympathy for what he saw as the excesses of the Oxford Movement. He supported the Public Worship Regulation Act 1874 but in 1878 was unhappy to be unable to prevent the imprisonment of the Rev. Sidney Faithorn Green, the incumbent of Miles Platting.

Fraser ultimately secured Green's release but Green's benefice was sequestrated by the courts. The parish patron, Sir Percival Heywood nominated Rev. Harry Cowgill, Green's unlawful curate, as the new incumbent. Fraser was involved in much litigation over his opposition to the appointment before being exonerated in a judgement by Baron Pollock in 1884.

== Later life ==
In 1880, he married Agnes Ellen Frances Duncan shortly after the death of his mother who had shared his home. He died suddenly at the bishop's palace following complications from a chill. Long known as the bishop of all denominations, his death was honoured by all the nonconformist churches along with the Jewish and Greek Orthodox congregations. Huge crowds attended his funeral in Manchester. He was interred in Ufton Nervet in his mother's grave.

== Honours ==
- A grade II listed statue by Thomas Woolner stands in Albert Square, Manchester. Local legend has it that Fraser is posed looking away from Alfred Waterhouse's Town Hall building because he disliked it so much.

== Bibliography ==
- Bentley, J. (1987) Ritualism and Politics in Victorian Britain: The Attempt to Legislate for Belief
- Bullock, C. (1889) The Lives of Three Bishops
- Diggle, J. W. (1887) The Lancashire Life of Bishop Fraser
- Hamilton, J. A. (1889). "Fraser, James (1818-1885)" . In Stephen, Leslie (ed.). Dictionary of National Biography. Vol. 20. London: Smith, Elder & Co.
- — rev. H. C. G. Matthew (2007) "Fraser, James (1818–1885)", Oxford Dictionary of National Biography, Oxford University Press, online edn, accessed 27 February 2008 (subscription, Wikipedia Library access or UK public library membership required)
- Hughes, T. (1887) James Fraser, Second Bishop of Manchester: A Memoir, 1818–1885
- Yates, N. (1999). Anglican Ritualism in Victorian Britain, 1830-1910. Oxford: Oxford University Press. pp. pp265–269. ISBN 0-19-826989-7.
