= New Market Hall, Bridgnorth =

Building in Bridgnorth, Shropshire, United Kingdom

New Market Hall
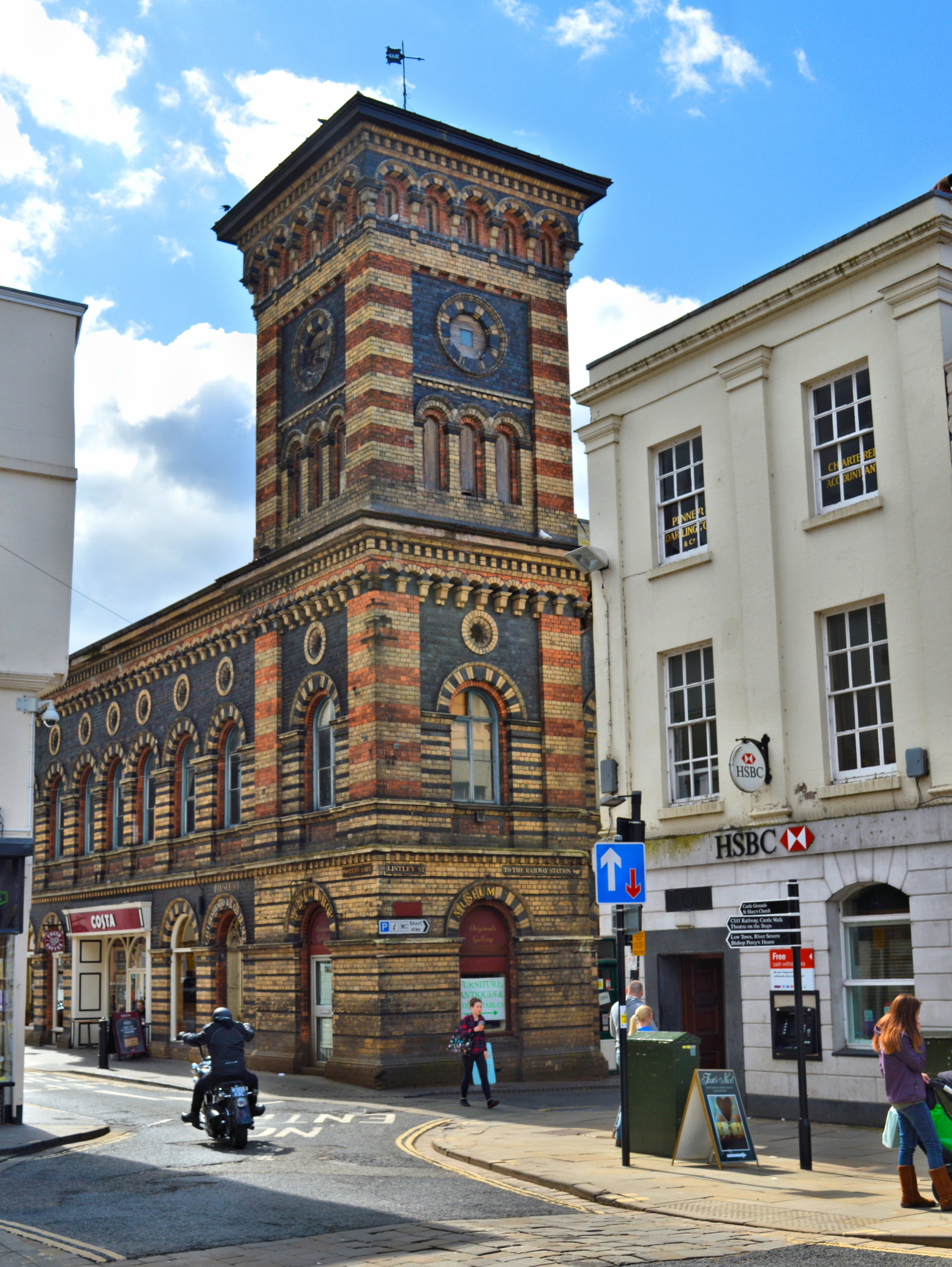
- Interactive map of the New Market Hall area

General information
- Status: Grade II listed
- Architectural style: Italianate
- Location: Postern Gate, Bridgnorth, Shropshire, United Kingdom
- Coordinates: 52°32′4.250″N 2°25′11.557″W grid reference SO 71593 93036
- Completed: 1859

Design and construction
- Architect: Robert Griffiths

The New Market Hall, also known as the New Market Buildings, is a building in Bridgnorth, Shropshire, United Kingdom, built between 1855 and 1859. It is a Grade II listed building.

== History ==
The local authority established Bridgnorth Public Buildings and Market Company Ltd, to build the New Market Hall, intended to accommodate traders and provide assembly rooms and offices.

The building was designed by Robert Griffiths of Quatford. Building started in 1855; the site was originally part of a castle moat and had loose infill, so that deep foundations had to be dug, and the buildings were not completed until 1859. It contained shops, market stalls and a butcher's market on the ground floor, and a public hall and library on the floor above.

Traders continued to trade in the street, despite efforts by the local authority including ordering police to clear away stalls. Ten of the traders won a court case against the local authority, in which a medieval charter was cited to establish that they had a right to trade in the open market place.

The building was sold by the company established by the local authority, at a loss, and a succession of businesses subsequently occupied the building. From the late 20th century into the early 21st century, there was a Co-Op supermarket on the ground floor, and Bridgnorth Museum of Childhood above. It gained listed status in 1987.

== Description ==
The building is in Italianate style, and has polychrome brickwork in red, white and blue. It has been described as representing "a singular example of a high status mid-19th century commercial building of note within the town". There are two storeys; at the top of the upper floor there is an elaborate entablature, comprising a deep cornice with a Lombard frieze supported by corbels. There is a tower at the north-eastern end, giving a third storey, where below the roof the entablature includes a miniature arcade.

== Present day ==
In more recent years, the building has fallen into disrepair. A petition was launched by a local resident in August 2024, noting this and stating: "If the owner does not make repairs within a reasonable timeframe, we call for a Compulsory Purchase Order to bring the building back into public ownership." The petition had collected over 1,500 signatures by February 2025, successfully triggering a Shropshire Council debate. Shropshire Council commented that it was aware of the issues relating to the building and was in contact with the owner, but efforts to engage the owner were proving unsuccessful.

In April 2026, The Victorian Society added the building to their Top Ten Endangered Buildings list for 2026. The list entry urges the owner to bring forward a viable scheme to put the building back into use, or to place the building on the market to allow a new custodian to secure its future. Support has also been received from Victorian Society president, Griff Rhys Jones.

== See also ==
- Listed buildings in Bridgnorth
