= Listed buildings in Bridgnorth =

Bridgnorth is a civil parish in Shropshire, England. It contains 252 listed buildings that are recorded in the National Heritage List for England. Of these, one is listed at Grade I, the highest of the three grades, twelve are at Grade II*, the middle grade, and the others are at Grade II, the lowest grade. The parish contains the town of Bridgnorth and the small villages of Quatford, Danesford, and Oldbury. The River Severn passes through the town, and divides it into two parts. The part on the western side is mainly hilly, and is known as High Town, and the part by the river and on its east side is much flatter, and is known as Low Town. The two parts are joined by a bridge over the river.

A castle and a collegiate church were established in High Town in the early 12th century, and the town grew following that. In the 13th century walls were built around the town, with five gateways. Most of the town was burnt down in 1646 during the Civil War, and it was rebuilt afterwards. Prosperity came in the 18th century with increasing river trade, but it has since declined, and the arrival of the railway in the 1850s did little to halt the decline. The town has since developed as a commuter town for the nearby cities.

Most of the listed buildings are in the High Town area of Bridgnorth, with a smaller group in Low Town near the bridge. The majority of these are houses and shops, many of them timber framed and dating from the 15th to 17th century, the best of these being Bishop Percy's House. Only a small fragment of the castle and the town walls have survived, and the only gateway is North Gate which is a 20th-century rebuilding on the original site. There are two churches that have retained a significant amount of medieval fabric, St Leonard's Church and St Mary Magdalene's Church in Quatford. The other listed buildings include public houses, hotels, clubs, offices, civic buildings, other churches, bridges, a bank, a folly, a warehouse, railway stations, a former textile mill, a drinking fountain, two conduit heads, a school, a war memorial, and a telephone kiosk.

== Key ==
| Grade | Criteria |
|---|---|
| I | Buildings of exceptional interest, sometimes considered to be internationally important |
| II* | Particularly important buildings of more than special interest |
| II | Buildings of national importance and special interest |

== Buildings ==
| Name and location | Photograph | Date | Notes | Grade |
|---|---|---|---|---|
| St Leonard's Church; 52.53718°N 2.41877°W | | 12th century | The tower was built in 1448, the church was damaged in 1646 and subsequently repaired, including a repair by Thomas Rickman in 1826. The church was largely rebuilt from 1860 in Geometric style, the tower remaining in Perpendicular style. The library was added in 1878, and the church became redundant in 1976. It is built in sandstone with tile roofs and ridge tiles on the chancel. The church consists of a nave, north and south aisles, a chancel with an octagonal library to the north, and a southwest tower. The tower has three stages, diagonal buttresses, a higher polygonal stair turret with a crocketed spirelet to the northwest, a south doorway, grotesques, a niche containing a statue, and an embattled parapet with crocketed pinnacles. | II* |
| St Mary Magdalene's Church, Quatford; 52.51361°N 2.38640°W | | 12th century | The oldest part of the church is the chancel, which is Norman in style. The nave and tower were rebuilt in 1714 in Decorated style, the chancel was restored in 1839, and in 1857 the south aisle and porch were added. The older part of the church is built in tufa, the later parts in sandstone, the chancel has a lead roof, and the rest of the roof is tiled. The west tower has three stages, diagonal buttresses, a clock face, and an embattled parapet with corner pinnacles. | II* |
| The Castle; 52.53216°N 2.41929°W | | c. 1200 | What remains of the castle is part of the keep tower and a fragment of the curtain wall. The tower leans at an angle of 75 degrees from the vertical. The site of the castle is also a Scheduled Monument. | II |
| Half Moon Battery; 52.53494°N 2.42329°W | — | 13th century | A portion of a semi-hexagonal bastion, which was part of the town's walls. | II |
| Fragment of Town Walls, Cartway; 52.53527°N 2.41858°W | — | 13th century (probable) | This is a short section of a sandstone wall extending to the northwest of Cartway. | II |
| Fragment of Town Walls, Hollybush Road; 52.53445°N 2.42341°W | — | 13th century (probable) | The fragment of wall is in sandstone, and has been incorporated into the retaining wall on the east side of the road. | II |
| Fragment of Town Walls near Postern Gate; 52.53416°N 2.42026°W | — | 13th century (probable) | The wall is in sandstone, and is about 6 yards (5.5 m) long and up to 15 feet (4.6 m) high. | II |
| Wall of former Franciscan Priory; 52.53713°N 2.41600°W | — | Medieval | The wall of the former Franciscan priory is in sandstone with a plinth on the north face. It extends for about 18 metres (59 ft) on a north–south axis and turns to the west for about 1 metre (3 ft 3 in), and is about 2.5 metres (8 ft 2 in) high. | II |
| Garden Bar (ex-British Legion Club); 52.53402°N 2.41450°W | | c. 1400 | A timber framed building with five bays of crucks and a tile roof. There are two storeys and the gabled front faces the road; this has been refronted with applied timber framing. | II |
| 15 Bridge Street; 52.53430°N 2.41698°W | | 15th century | The shop has a timber framed core. It is refaced and stuccoed with a tile roof, and has two storeys and attics. In the ground floor is a 19th-century shop front, the upper floor contains a three-light canted oriel window with a pentice roof, and in the attic are two gabled dormers. | II |
| The Chantry; 52.51598°N 2.38545°W | — | 15th century | The cottage dates mainly from the 18th century, and a wing was added later. It possibly originated as a chapel, and contains a piscina. The cottage is in red sandstone, and has a string course, coped eaves, and a slate roof. There are two storeys, an early 19th-century doorcase and casement windows. | II |
| 21 and 22 Northgate; 52.53733°N 2.42093°W | | 16th century | A pair of timber framed houses with a tile roof. They have two storeys, casement windows, and doorways with hoods. | II |
| 15 St John's Street; 52.53387°N 2.41293°W | | 16th century | A timber framed cottage with brick infill, that has a gabled front with plain bargeboards, and a tile roof. There are two storeys, a doorway with a plain surround flanked by two-light windows, and a three-light window in the upper floor. | II |
| Baxter's Cottage; 52.53686°N 2.41944°W | | 16th century | A small timber framed cottage with plaster infill and a tile roof. It has one storey and an attic, and contains a doorway to the left, a casement window, and a gabled dormer. Above the window is an inscription referring to the residence here of the church leader Richard Baxter in 1640–41. | II |
| 41–43 Mill Street; 52.53548°N 2.41317°W | — | Late 16th century | A row of three timber framed houses on a brick plinth, with plaster infill, some stucco, and some brick. The roof is tiled and there are two storeys and an attic. The doorways and casement windows have plain surrounds, and there is one flat-roofed dormer. | II |
| 25 Northgate; 52.53711°N 2.42083°W | | Late 16th century | A timber framed shop with plaster infill. There are two storeys and an attic and two gabled bays with plain bargeboards. In the ground floor is a modern shop front, and above are casement windows. | II |
| 5 and 6 St Mary's Street; 52.53534°N 2.42082°W | — | Late 16th century | A pair of houses, timber framed with plastered infill, and a tile roof. They have two storeys and attics, and three bays. No. 5 has a tiled projection. The doorway have plain surrounds, the windows are a mix of sashes and casements, and in the roof are three gabled dormers. | II |
| 45 and 46 St Mary's Street; 52.53482°N 2.42253°W | — | Late 16th century | A pair of timber framed houses with brick infill, sprocket eaves, and a tile roof. They have one storey and attics, and the doorway and casement windows have plain surrounds. | II |
| 50–54 St Mary's Street; 52.53501°N 2.42170°W | — | Late 16th century | A row of five timber framed cottages with brick infill on a brick plinth, with a tile roof. They have one storey and attics, casements, doors with hoods, and six gabled dormers. | II |
| Former Carpenter's Arms Public House; 52.53589°N 2.42207°W | | Late 16th century | The building is timber framed with brick infill and a gabled front. There are two storeys and two bays. In the ground floor are modern shop fronts, and above are casement windows. Now a private house. | II |
| Bishop Percy's House; 52.53492°N 2.41702°W | | 1580 | A timber framed house with plaster infill, a moulded cornice, and a tile roof. There are three storeys, each jettied on decorative consoles, and three bays, each having a gable with bargeboards. The windows are mullioned and transomed, and at the rear is a square stair turret. It was the birthplace of Thomas Percy, who became Bishop of Dromore. | I |
| 48 Cartway; 52.53461°N 2.41697°W | | c. 1600 | A house that was extended in the 18th century, and later used for other purposes. The original part is timber framed with plaster infill, the rear wing is in brick, and the building has a tile roof. On the front are two storeys and an attic, and two bays. In the ground floor is a shop front flanked by doorways, and above them is a fascia with a cornice on consoles. In the upper floor are casement windows, and in the attic are two gabled dormers. | II |
| King's Head Public House; 52.53638°N 2.42103°W | | c. 1600 | The public house is timber framed with plaster infill. There are three storeys, each floor and the gables jettied, and three bays. Th windows are modern casements, and the gables have bargeboards. | II |
| 16 High Street and the Crown public house 52.53619°N 2.42030°W | | 16th to 17th century | Most of the building dates from the 18th century. No. 16 originated as an assembly room, and its ground floor was altered more recently. It has since been a shop in red brick with dentilled modillion eaves, a tile roof, three storeys and an attic, and three bays. In the ground floor are three elliptical arches and a recessed shop front. The middle floor contains three Venetian windows, in the top floor are four sash windows, and there are three dormers with hipped roofs in the attic. To the right is a public house in brown brick with a moulded eaves cornice, a hipped tile roof, three storeys, and two bays. In the ground floor is a pub front, the middle floor contains a deeply recessed bow window, and in the top floor are two sash windows with moulded lintels. | II |
| 1 and 3 Stourbridge Road; 52.53067°N 2.41155°W | — | 16th to 17th century | No. 3 is the older, it is timber framed with a tile roof. The house has one storey and an attic, three bays, and the windows are casements. No. 1 is at right angles, facing Hospital Street. It dates from the early 19th century, it is stuccoed, and has a tile roof. There are two storeys, three bays, and a central gabled porch. Most windows are sashes and there is one casement window. | II |
| Northgate Cafe / Bailey's Bistro; 52.53653°N 2.42008°W | | 16th to 17th century | The building is timber framed on a stuccoed brick plinth, and has a tile roof. There are two storeys and attics, and a front of two bays. Parts of the left return are jettied. On the front is a recessed doorway, casement windows, and two gabled dormers, and in the left return are sash windows. | II |
| Parlor's Hall; 52.53473°N 2.41335°W | | 16th to 17th century | A house that was refaced in red brick in about 1800, and later used as a hotel. There are three storeys, a front of three bays, two bays on the side, and flanking wings. It has a coped parapet, a hipped roof, a modern glazed porch and doorway, and sash windows with plain surrounds. | II |
| Grammar School House; 52.53680°N 2.41836°W | | c. 1625 | A row of three houses in red brick with stone dressings and tiled roofs. They have three storeys, each house has two gabled bays and a two-storey gabled porch with a segmental-headed entrance. The windows are mullioned with flat lintels. | II* |
| 3 and 4 High Street; 52.53689°N 2.42077°W | — | Early 17th century | A pair of timber framed houses with plaster infill. Repairs have been carried out in red brick, and No. 4 has been converted into a shop. Each part has three storeys, and a gable with plain bargeboards. Most of the windows are sashes, and above the shop front is a casement window. | II |
| 51 High Street; 52.53526°N 2.41941°W | — | Early 17th century | A timber framed shop with plaster infill and a tile roof. There are two storeys, each of the upper storeys jettied, and two bays. In the ground floor is an open shop front with a slated pentice roof, in the middle floor are sash windows, and in the roof are two gabled dormers. | II |
| 53 High Street; 52.53539°N 2.41951°W | — | Early 17th century | A timber framed shop with plaster infill and a tile roof. There are two storeys, two bays, and a large gabled attic in the right bay. In the ground floor is a modern shop front and a passageway on the left. The windows are casements, and there is a gabled dormer in the left bay. | II |
| 57 High Street; 52.53562°N 2.41956°W | — | Early 17th century | A timber framed shop with plaster infill, the middle storey refaced with roughcast, a moulded cornice, and a tile roof. There are three storeys and the windows are modern. In the ground floor is a modern shop front, the middle floor has two windows, the top floor three, and above are two gables. At the rear is a range partly in brick and partly timber framed. | II |
| 56 St Mary's Street; 52.53509°N 2.42151°W | — | Early 17th century | A timber framed house with plaster infill, two storeys and two bays. The upper floor is jettied on a moulded cornice. The doorway has a moulded surround, the windows are casements, and there are two gables with plain bargeboards. | II |
| Governor's House; 52.53334°N 2.41862°W | | c. 1630 | A red brick house that has a tile roof with moulded copings. There are two storeys with attics, and three gabled bays. The central bay is narrower and forms a two -storey porch with an attic and a stone pointed arch. The windows are mullioned and transomed with hood moulds. | II* |
| Raven Hotel; 52.53631°N 2.42086°W | | 1646 | The hotel is timber framed with plaster infill and has a tile roof. There are two storeys with attics, the top part jettied, and three bays. In the ground floor is a doorway and three double windows, in the upper floor are three casement windows on decorative corbels, and in the attic are three gabled dormers. | II |
| 34–36 High Street; 52.53535°N 2.41985°W | | c. 1650 | A row of timber framed shops with plaster infill and tiled roofs, three storeys, and attics. In the ground floor are modern shop fronts. Above are bay windows and casement windows, and carved figures on pilaster consoles. The upper storeys are jettied, and in the roof are four gabled dormers. | II* |
| 54–57 Cartway; 52.53505°N 2.41721°W | — | 17th century | A row of four brick houses with tile roofs. They have two storeys with attics, and each house has one or two bays. In the ground floor of each house is a large window, previously a weaver's window, in the upper floor are mullioned and transomed windows, and each house has a gabled dormer. | II |
| 32 Friars Street; 52.53666°N 2.41657°W | — | 17th century | A timber framed house with plaster infill, sprocketed eaves, and a tile roof. There is one storey and an attic. The north front is gabled with plain bargeboards, the windows are casements, and the doorway has a plain surround. | II |
| 36–38 Mill Street; 52.53568°N 2.41293°W | — | 17th century | A row of three cottages; No. 36 is in brick, and Nos. 37 and 38 are in sandstone with repairs in brick. They have a tiled roof, one storey with attics, and two bays each. The doorways have plain surrounds, two windows are sashes and two are casements, and there are five hipped dormers and one gabled dormer. | II |
| 1–7 Northgate and 16 Moat Street; 52.53730°N 2.42052°W | | 17th century | A row of timber framed houses encased in brick, with tile roofs, two storeys, and one bay each. The windows are casements, those in the ground floor of Nos. 2–7 with segmental heads, and Nos.2 and 3 have gabled half-dormers. There is exposed timber framing on the return of No. 7. No. 1 projects and has a hipped roof, a canted bay window, and sash windows on the Moor Street front. At its rear is No. 16 Moor Street, a small L-shaped wing with sash windows. | II |
| 8–10 Northgate; 52.53750°N 2.42072°W | — | 17th century | A row of timber framed houses encased in brown brick. with dentilled eaves and a tile roof. There are two storeys and two bays. The doorways have plain surrounds and hoods, and the windows are sashes with segmental heads. | II |
| 1 Waterloo Terrace; 52.53485°N 2.41871°W | — | 17th century | A shop, mainly rendered, with three storeys, the gabled front facing the road. In the ground floor is a Victorian shop front, canted at the ends, and with a central doorway, above is a sash window, and the bargeboards are pierced. The part of the shop at the rear has a brick ground floor and exposed timber framing above, and contains casement windows. | II |
| 4 Waterloo Terrace; 52.53479°N 2.41906°W | — | 17th century (probable) | A pair of shops, the brick front dating from the 18th century. There are two storeys and attic, and three bays. In the ground floor are two modern shop fronts, above are three sash windows, and in the attic are two hipped dormers. | II |
| 7 and 8 Waterloo Terrace; 52.53473°N 2.41932°W | | 17th century (probable) | A pair of shops, basically timber framed, with early 19th-century stucco. They have three storeys and a tall parapet, the upper floors are jettied, and there are four bays. In the ground floor are two modern shop fronts, above are sash windows, those in the top floor with cornices on consoles. | II |
| Premises formerly occupied by the Shropshire Star; 52.53462°N 2.41931°W | | 17th century | The building is basically timber framed, and has a plastered exterior. There are two storeys and three bays. Each bay is gabled with bargeboards and a finial, and contains a modern shop front in the ground floor and modern windows. | II |
| Swan Inn; 52.53534°N 2.41943°W | | c. 1651 | The public house is timber framed with plaster infill, modillion eaves, and a tile roof. There are three storeys and attics, each storey jettied. Along the middle floor is a run of seven sash windows, and in the attic are three hipped dormers. | II* |
| Town Hall; 52.53567°N 2.41979°W | | 1652 | The town hall stands on an island site in High Street. Its upper part is timber framed and the lower part has an arcade in stone encased in brick. The building was restored in 1887 when two turrets were added. It has sides of four bays, and gabled ends of one bay, each gable containing a clock face. The windows are mullioned and transomed, in the centre of each end is an oriel window, and on the east side is a gabled dormer. The turrets have a timber framed lower part, bell openings, and an ogee dome with a weathervane. | II* |
| 48 Mill Street; 52.53493°N 2.41370°W | — | c. 1675 | A roughcast house on a plinth, later used for other purposes, it has quoins, string courses, a modillion eaves cornice, and a hipped tile roof. There are three storeys, a square plan, and three bays. The doorway has a moulded surround, a cornice on large consoles, and a modern hood. The windows are sashes in moulded architraves. | II* |
| 32 Cartway; 52.53510°N 2.41736°W | — | Late 17th century | A roughcast house with a tile roof, it has two storeys and an attic, and two bays. There is a modern window in the ground floor, two mullioned windows in the upper floor, and a gabled dormer in the attic. | II |
| Diamond Hall; 52.53396°N 2.41257°W | — | Late 17th century | A red brick house with string courses and a square hipped tile roof. There are three storeys, and a central doorway with a moulded surround and a large shell canopy on decorative modillion brackets. The windows are sashes, and in the roof are dormers. | II |
| 6–11 Cartway; 52.53539°N 2.41798°W | — | 17th to 18th century | A row of brick cottages, with tiled roofs, and one and two storeys. There are various windows, including gabled dormers. | II |
| 4 and 5 East Castle Street; 52.53406°N 2.41890°W | — | 17th to 18th century | A pair of roughcast cottages with dentilled eaves and a tile roof. They have one storey and attics, and two bays each. The doorways have plain surrounds, the windows of No. 4 have segmental heads, and in the attics are four gables dormers. | II |
| 35 Mill Street; 52.53579°N 2.41279°W | — | 17th to 18th century | A house that has been altered, it is in brick with a tile roof. There is one storey and an attic. In the ground floor is a modern casement window, to the right a square-headed doorway, a larger doorway, and a square-headed entrance, and in the attic are two modern dormers. | II |
| 39 Mill Street; 52.53555°N 2.41310°W | — | 17th to 18th century | A sandstone house with some brick and a tile roof. There is one storey and an attic, and two bays. It has two doorways, casement windows, and two gabled dormers. | II |
| 40 Mill Street; 52.53549°N 2.41315°W | — | 17th to 18th century | A brick house with a tile roof, two storeys and two bays. To the left is a segmental archway with a recessed door, and the windows are mullioned casements, those in the ground floor having segmental heads. | II |
| Railings and gates, The Chantry; 52.51593°N 2.38553°W | — | 17th to 18th century | The gates and railings are in wrought iron, and have been re-set from elsewhere. | II |
| Chantry Cottage; 52.51596°N 2.38632°W | — | 17th to 18th century | The cottage is in sandstone and brick with a tile roof. It has two storeys, a protruding chimney breast, and casement windows. The cottage is built into a rock face, and some rooms are quarried into it. | II |
| 42 Cartway; 52.53460°N 2.41713°W | — | Early 18th century | The house is in stone and brick, with damaged quoins and a tile roof. There are two storeys and two bays. In the ground floor the main doorway is flanked by small-paned windows, and there is another doorway to the right. The upper storey contains two windows in arched recesses. | II |
| 43 Cartway; 52.53455°N 2.41716°W | — | Early 18th century | A stuccoed house with a tile roof, two storeys and an attic. In the ground floor is a doorway with a plain surround, sash windows adjoining on both sides, and a cornice above them. There is another sash window in the upper floor, and in the attic is a gabled dormer. | II |
| 3 Church Street; 52.53668°N 2.41956°W | — | Early 18th century | A brick house with string courses, a parapet, three storeys and three bays. Steps with wrought iron railings lead up to a doorway with a moulded surround, pilasters, a fanlight, and a pediment hood, and the windows are sashes. | II |
| 26 High Street; 52.53581°N 2.42007°W | — | Early 18th century | A brick shop with plain eaves, three storeys and two bays. In the ground floor is a modern shop front, above are side pilasters, sash windows with moulded keyblocks, and a rainwater head with a heraldic motif. | II |
| 33 High Street; 52.53542°N 2.41988°W | — | Early 18th century | A brick shop with a band, a modillion eaves cornice, and tile roof. There are three storeys and an attic, and two bays. In the ground floor is a modern shop front, above are sash windows with segmental heads, and in the attic is a gabled dormer. | II |
| 43 High Street; 52.53483°N 2.41961°W | — | Early 18th century | A brick shop with quoins, a moulded sill band, and a coped parapet. There are three storeys and three bays. In the ground floor is a modern shop front, and above are sash windows with moulded segmental lintels and keyblocks, the central window in the top floor being blind. | II |
| 50 High Street; 52.53519°N 2.41940°W | — | Early 18th century | A shop and offices in brick with quoins, a moulded string course, corbelled eaves, and a tile roof. There are three storeys and attics, and six bays. In the ground floor are two modern shop fronts, and an archway to the right with an elliptical head. The windows in the upper floors are sashes, and in the attic are three gabled dormers. | II |
| 73 High Street; 52.53417°N 2.41380°W | — | Early 18th century | A brick shop with quoins, a band, and a parapet. There are three storeys and two bays. In the ground floor is a modern shop front, and above are sash windows in architraves. | II |
| 1 and 2 Mill Street; 52.53418°N 2.41382°W | — | Early 18th century | A pair of shops in red brick on earlier sandstone, with quoins, a moulded cornice, and a coped parapet. There are three storeys and six bays. In the ground floor is a 19th-century doorway with a moulded surround and modern shop fronts, and above are sash windows with segmental heads. | II |
| 3–5 Mill Street; 52.53430°N 2.41382°W | — | Early 18th century | A row of three cement-faced shops with a tile roof, two storeys and six bays. In the ground floor are modern shop fronts, one bay window, and three doorways with moulded surrounds, and in the upper floor are sash windows with segmental heads. | II |
| 53 Mill Street; 52.53452°N 2.41399°W | — | Early 18th century | A roughcast shop on a plinth, with a tile roof, three storeys and four bays. In the ground floor is a shop front, and to the left is a sash window and an entry with a door and a hood. In the upper floors are sash windows, the outer windows in the middle floor being oriels. | II |
| 3 St John's Street; 52.53402°N 2.41382°W | — | Early 18th century | A shop in red brick on earlier sandstone, on a plinth, with a stone band and a coped parapet. There are three storeys and five bays. In the ground floor is a 19th-century shop front, with a round-headed window in a recess to the right, and a round-headed entry further to the right. In the upper floors are sash windows and one small window. | II |
| 7 St John's Street; 52.53392°N 2.41331°W | — | Early 18th century | A house in brick and stone on an earlier timber framed core, it has rusticated stone pilasters, a moulded stone cornice, and a tile roof. There are two storeys and two bays. The doorway has a moulded surround and a canopy, and the windows are sashes. | II |
| 8 St John's Street; 52.53392°N 2.41323°W | — | Early 18th century | The core of the house dates probably from the 17th century. It is in brick with a rusticated pilaster on the left, and a parapet with brick coping. There are two storeys and two bays. In the ground floor is a doorway with a moulded surround and voluted brackets, it is flanked by modern windows, and above the doorway and the right window is a moulded cornice. In the upper floor are sash windows with segmental heads. | II |
| 5 and 6 Waterloo Terrace; 52.53475°N 2.41918°W | — | Early 18th century | A pair of shops in red brick with stone dressings, pilasters at the sides and a pair in the middle, a dentilled stone eaves cornice, and a coped parapet. There are four storeys and two bays. In the ground floor are modern shop fronts. The windows in the first and second floors are sashes with decorative keyblocks, in the first floor they have fluted aprons, and in the second floor they have voluted and decorative sills. | II |
| 63 Whitburn Street; 52.53599°N 2.42179°W | — | Early 18th century (probable) | A shop in brick with moulded stone eaves and a tile roof. There are three storeys and three bays. In the ground floor is a shop front, and to the left is an semicircular archway with a rusticated surround and a keyblock. The windows are sashes, those in the top floor with keyblocks and channelled lintels. | II |
| Black Boy Public House; 52.53517°N 2.41721°W | | Early 18th century | The public house is in brick with quoins, moulded brick eaves, and a tile roof. There are two storeys and an attic, and four bays. In the ground floor is a 19th-century inn front, in the upper floor are sash windows with decorative keyblocks and flat brick arches, and in the attic are two gabled dormers. | II |
| The Court; 52.53528°N 2.41872°W | — | Early 18th century | A stuccoed house that has a curved gable with moulded coping. There are three storeys and three bays. The doorway has Tuscan columns, and a pediment with an inset shell tympanum, and the windows are sashes. | II* |
| Westwood House; 52.51693°N 2.43941°W | — | Early 18th century | A farmhouse, later a private house, in red brick with parapets, and with roofs mainly in tile and some slate. There are three storeys and five bays, with extensions to the west. The north front is symmetrical, with a central Doric portico and sash windows. Elsewhere there are casement windows and cross windows. | II |
| 23 High Street; 52.53597°N 2.42018°W | — | Early to mid 18th century | A red brick shop with quoins, and a coped roof. There are three storeys and three bays. In the ground floor is a modern shop front, and above are sash windows with segmental heads and keyblocks. | II |
| 26 and 27 St Leonard's Close; 52.53705°N 2.41954°W | — | Early to mid 18th century | A pair of red brick houses with side pilasters, moulded stone eaves, and a tile roof. There are two storeys with attics, and each house has two bays. The doorways are in the outer bays, and have moulded surrounds and canopies. The windows are sashes with keyblocks, and in the attics are four gabled dormers. | II |
| Northgate House; 52.53674°N 2.42071°W | | c. 1750 | A red brick house in Georgian style, on a plinth, with quoins, a moulded cornice, and a parapet. There are three storeys and a symmetrical front of five bays. The central doorway has a moulded surround, Tuscan pilasters, and a pediment. The windows are sashes with keyblocks and moulded sills. | II |
| 7 and 8 Bridge Street; 52.53402°N 2.41440°W | — | 18th century | A pair of brick shops with a tile roof. There are two storeys and an attic, and four bays. In the ground floor are 19th-century shop fronts, and above are sash windows. | II |
| 18–23 Cartway; 52.53544°N 2.41745°W | — | 18th century | A row of six red brick houses with tile roofs. They have two storeys and attics. The windows vary, and in the attics are six gabled dormers. | II |
| 24–26 Cartway; 52.53530°N 2.41742°W | — | 18th century | A row of three brick houses stepped down a slope. They have a tiled roof, two storeys, and one bay each. The houses have plain doorways, the windows are casements, and there are two gabled dormers. | II |
| 29–31 Cartway; 52.53512°N 2.41736°W | — | 18th century | A brick house with dentilled eaves and a tile roof. There are three storeys and a basement, and two bays. Steps with railings lead up to a central doorway with a cornice hood on consoles. The windows are modern casements. | II |
| 37 Cartway; 52.53481°N 2.41718°W | — | 18th century | A brick house with dentil eaves and a tile roof. There are two storeys and an attic, and two bays. In the ground floor is a doorway and a passage entry to the left. The windows are modern, and in the attic are two gabled dormers. | II |
| 38–40 Cartway; 52.53475°N 2.41717°W | — | 18th century | A row of three brick houses with dentilled eaves and a tile roof. They have two storeys and attics, and one bay each. Steps lead up to the doorways that have plain surrounds. The windows are mullioned and transomed with segmental heads. | II |
| 41 Cartway; 52.53466°N 2.41712°W | — | 18th century | A red brick house with dentil eaves and a tile roof. There are two storeys and an attic, and a symmetrical front of two bays. The central doorway has a bracketed hood. The windows are mullioned and transomed with segmental heads, and in the attic are two gabled dormers. | II |
| 45 Cartway; 52.53438°N 2.41699°W | — | 18th century | The building is in brick with a band, moulded stone eaves, and a tile roof. There are two storeys and an attic, and four bays. In the ground floor is an outbuilt pentice roof, in the upper floor are casement windows, and in the roof are four gabled dormers. | II |
| 47 Cartway; 52.53454°N 2.41695°W | — | 18th century | A shop in brown brick with dentil eaves and a tile roof. There are three storeys and two bays. In the ground floor is a modern shop front. The windows are sashes, those in the middle floor having segmental heads. | II |
| 53 Cartway; 52.53492°N 2.41713°W | — | 18th century | A brick house with a tile roofs, two storeys and an attic, and three bays. The windows are mullioned and transomed and contain casements. | II |
| 59–64 Cartway; 52.53534°N 2.41719°W | — | 18th century | A row of six cottages stretching up a hill, with two storeys at the bottom and one at the top, in brick with tiled roofs. The doorways have plain surrounds and segmental heads, and the windows are mullioned casements, some with segmental heads. Some of the cottages have a gabled dormer. | II |
| 65 and 66 Cartway; 52.53555°N 2.41732°W | — | 18th century | A pair of red brick houses with dentil eaves and a tile roof. There are two storeys and attics, and each house has one bay. The doorways have plain surrounds and flat hoods, the windows have segmental heads, and in the attics are two dormers with hipped roofs. | II |
| 67 Cartway; 52.53560°N 2.41738°W | — | 18th century | A brick house with a tile roof, one storey and an attic. The doorway has a plain surround and a wide tiled canopy. There are two sash windows and a large dormer in the attic. | II |
| 68 Cartway; 52.53568°N 2.41741°W | — | 18th century | A roughcast house with probably a 17th-century core, plain eaves and a tile roof. There are two storeys with an attic, and two bays. The doorway has a plain surround and a simple hood, the windows are sashes, and in the attic are two gabled dormers. | II |
| 97 Cartway; 52.53497°N 2.41877°W | — | 18th century | A shop that was refronted in brick in the 19th century, it has two storeys and an attic, and three bays. In the ground floor, steps lead up to a central doorway with a plain surround, to the left is a bay window, to the right is a shop window, and over them all is a cornice. In the upper floor are casement windows with segmental heads, and in the attic are three gabled dormers. | II |
| 7 Castle Terrace; 52.53460°N 2.41854°W | — | 18th century | A brick house with a tile roofs, two storeys and two bays. The doorway has a moulded surround with pilasters and a small cornice hood, and the windows are sashes with cambered heads. | II |
| 1 and 2 Church Street; 52.53662°N 2.41976°W | — | 18th century | A pair of red brick houses with a tile roof. They have two storeys and three bays each. The doorways have moulded surrounds, and in No. 3 is an oriel window and two gabled dormers. | II |
| 2 and 3 East Castle Street; 52.53421°N 2.41894°W | — | 18th century | A pair of houses following the curve of the street, they are in brick with dentilled eaves, and two storeys. The doorway has a moulded surround and a cornice hood on consoles, and there is a square-headed passageway to the right. There are three three-light sash windows with hoods on consoles, and one casement window. | II |
| 17 and 17A East Castle Street; 52.53312°N 2.41851°W | — | 18th century | A house that was extended by the addition of a wing at right angles to the west in the 19th century. It is in red brick, and has a hipped and gabled tile roof. No. 17 has two storeys and an attic and three bays, and a central doorway with pilasters, an entablature and a rectangular fanlight. The windows in both parts ore sashes with rusticated stone heads and keystones. No. 17 has three pedimented dormers with casements, and on the side of No. 17A is a canted bay window. | II |
| 20 East Castle Street; 52.53361°N 2.41853°W | | 18th century | The house probably has a 17th-century core. It is in red brick with quoins, moulded brick eaves, and a tile roof. There are two storeys and an attic and six bays. The doorway has a moulded surround, a rectangular fanlight, and a cornice hood on consoles. The windows are sashes with moulded lintels and keyblocks, and there are three gabled dormers. | II* |
| 30–32 East Castle Street; 52.53436°N 2.41896°W | — | 18th century | The building, at one time a hotel, is in brick on a plinth with a tile roof. It has two storeys and attics, and seven bays. In the ground floor steps lead up to a doorway with a gabled canopy, there are three 19th-century windows, one an oriel window, and on the left is a square-headed entry. The upper floor contains sash windows with segmental heads, and in the attics are three gabled dormers. | II |
| 5 and 6 High Street; 52.53682°N 2.42069°W | — | 18th century | A pair of brick shops with a tile roof. There are two storeys and attics, and four bays. In the ground floor are modern shop fronts, in the upper floor are sash windows, and in the attics are two gabled dormers. | II |
| 11–13 High Street; 52.53639°N 2.42044°W | — | 18th century | A row of three brick shops with modillion eaves and a tile roof. There are two storeys and attics. In the ground floor are modern shop fronts, in the upper floor are four sash windows and three blocked windows, and in the roof are four gabled dormers. | II |
| 27 and 28 High Street; 52.53574°N 2.42006°W | — | Mid 18th century | A pair of brick shop with pilasters, a moulded cornice, and moulded brick eaves. There are three storeys and four bays. In the ground floor are modern shop fronts, and above are sash windows with keyblocks. | II |
| 29 High Street; 52.53567°N 2.42002°W | — | 18th century | A brick shop with an earlier, probably 17th-century, core with brick eaves and a tile roof. There are two storeys and an attic, and a front of three bays. In the ground floor is a modern shop front, in the upper floor are three sash windows, and in the attic are two gabled dormers. | II |
| 30 High Street; 52.53560°N 2.41998°W | — | Mid 18th century | A shop in red brick with brick eaves. There are three storeys and three bays. In the ground floor is a modern shop front, and above are sash windows, those in the middle floor having channelled keyblocks and decorative lintels. | II |
| 31 High Street; 52.53553°N 2.41992°W | — | 18th century (probable) | A shop that has a 19th-century front in red brick. There are three storeys, a modern shop front in the ground floor, and sash windows above. | II |
| 32 High Street; 52.53550°N 2.41991°W | — | 18th century (probable) | A shop that dates mainly from the 19th century. It is on a corner site, in brick, and with a coped roof. There are three storeys and two bays. In the ground floor is a modern shop front, and sash windows above. | II |
| 40, 41 and 41A High Street; 52.53496°N 2.41966°W | — | 18th century | A brick shop with a parapet, three storeys and four bays. No. 40 has a modern shop front, and No. 41 has an early Victorian shop front with a central doorway flanked by three-light windows divided by pilasters and with segmental heads. In the upper floors are sash windows. | II |
| 42 High Street; 52.53489°N 2.41961°W | — | 18th century | A brick shop with a band, a modillion eaves cornice, and a tile roof. There are three storeys and an attic, and two bays. In the ground floor is a 19th-century shop front with two doorways above which is a moulded cornice and a fascia board. | II |
| 55 and 56 High Street; 52.53553°N 2.41952°W | — | Mid 18th century | A pair of brick shops with quoins, a band, and moulded stone eaves. There are three storeys and four bays. In the ground floor, No. 55 has a 19th-century shop front with bow windows flanking a central doorway, and No. 56 has a modern shop front. In the upper floors are sash windows in moulded architraves. | II |
| 71 and 72 High Street; 52.53620°N 2.41985°W | — | 18th century | A brick shop with a band and a tile roof. There are two storeys and an attic, and three bays. In the ground floor is a modern shop front, in the upper floor are three sash windows, and in the roof are two flat-roofed dormers. | II |
| 77 High Street; 52.53649°N 2.42002°W | — | 18th century | The shop has been refronted on earlier fabric, and is in brick with modillion eaves and a tile roof. There are two storeys and an attic. The ground floor contains a 19th-century shop front, in the upper storey is a five-light mullioned bay window, and in the attic are two gabled dormers. | II |
| 78 and 79 High Street; 52.53663°N 2.42019°W | — | 18th century | A pair of shops, No. 78 in painted brick, No. 79 in red brick, with dentilled eaves and tiled roofs. They have three storeys, and two bays each. In the ground floor are modern shop fronts, and above are a mix of sash and casement windows. | II |
| 30 and 30A Salop Street; 52.53524°N 2.42584°W | — | Mid 18th century | A pair of red brick houses, rendered at the front, with a tile roof. There are two storeys and attics, a rear wing, and each house has one bay. The doorways have flat hood, and the windows are casements, those in the ground floor with segmental heads. In the attics are two gabled dormers. | II |
| 4 St John's Street; 52.53399°N 2.41366°W | — | 18th century | A stuccoed house with a tile roof, two storeys with an attic, and two bays. There are two two-storey canted bay windows, a ground floor window to the left, and two gabled dormers. The doorway has a plain surround, and at the top is a moulded panel. | II |
| 28 and 29 St Leonard's Close; 52.53690°N 2.41944°W | — | 18th century | A pair of brick houses with a tile roof, two storeys attics. Each house has a doorway with a tiled canopy and two casement windows, and there is a small window in the upper floor on the right. In the attics are two gabled dormers. | II |
| 7–10 St Mary's Street; 52.53530°N 2.42102°W | — | 18th century | A row of four brick houses with tiled roofs; most have dentil eaves. Nos. 7 and 8 have three storeys, Nos. 9 and 10 have two storeys and an attic. Nos. 7, 8 and 10 have two bays, and No. 9 has one. The windows are sashes, and Nos. 9 and 10 have gabled dormers. | II |
| 12–14 and 18–20 St Mary's Street; 52.53516°N 2.42175°W | — | 18th century | A row of six brick houses with tiled roofs and sash windows. Nos. 12 and 13 have three storeys and four bays, and contain an arched passage entry. No. 14 has two storeys and an attic, two bays, a main door and a passage door, and two gabled dormers. No. 18 has two storeys and attics, three bays, two main doors and a passage door between them, and three gabled dormers. No. 20 is lower, with two storeys and an attic, two bays, and a gabled dormer. | II |
| 23–28 St Mary's Street; 52.53502°N 2.42232°W | — | 18th century | A row of six brick houses with dentilled eaves and tiled roofs. No. 23 is stuccoed, it has two storeys and an attic, one bay, a shop front in the ground floor, a modern window in the upper floor, and a gabled dormer. Nos. 24 and 25 have three storeys and one bay each, doorways with plain surrounds, and casement windows. No. 26 is taller, with three storeys and two bays, a doorway with a moulded surround and a passage door to the left, and sash windows. Nos. 27 and 28 have two storeys and attics, two bays each, doorways with moulded surrounds in the inners bays with a passage door between them, sash windows, and two dormers. | II |
| 55 St Mary's Street; 52.53506°N 2.42162°W | — | 18th century (probable) | A brick house with a tile roof, two storeys with an attic, and two bays. There are two doorways with plain surrounds, two sash windows with segmental heads in each floor, and two gabled dormers. | II |
| 57–61 St Mary's Street; 52.53514°N 2.42113°W | — | 18th century | A row of brick houses over earlier timber framing, with tile roofs. Each house has two storeys and an attic, two bays, and two gabled dormers. No. 57 has a square bay window and a doorway under a cornice to the right, a wider opening to the left, and sash windows. The brick has been removed from No. 58 exposing timber framing with cement infill. It has a doorway with a plain surround to the left, and replacement windows. No. 59 has a central doorway with a large window to the right, and the other windows are casements with segmental heads. | II |
| 3 Waterloo Terrace; 52.53481°N 2.41893°W | — | 18th century | A shop, probably containing earlier fabric, in brick with dentilled eaves and a tile roof. There are two storeys with attics, and two bays. To the left is a 19th-century doorway with a moulded surround and pilasters, and to the right is a modern shop front. The windows are sashes, and in the attic are two gabled dormers. | II |
| 23 West Castle Street; 52.53256°N 2.41952°W | — | 18th century (probable) | Most of the house dates from the early 19th century. It is roughcast with a tile roof. There are two storeys and an attic and three bays. The doorway has a moulded surround, pilasters, and a cornice hood on consoles. The windows are sashes with segmental heads, and in the attic are two gabled dormers. | II |
| 9, 9A and 9B Whitburn Street; 52.53618°N 2.42165°W | — | Mid 18th century | A shop and dwelling in red brick with dentilled eaves and a tile roof. The main block has three storeys and two bays, with a modern shop front in the ground floor and sash windows above. At the rear are two gables with casement windows, and a single-storey link to a two-storey wing with a single-storey extension beyond. In the rear wing are pigeon holes and perches. | II |
| 52 Whitburn Street; 52.53559°N 2.42291°W | — | Mid 18th century | A house, later used for other purposes, it is in red brick on a plinth, with quoins, a string course, modillion eaves, and a tile roof. It has two storeys and a symmetrical front of three bays. The central doorway has a moulded surround, pilasters, and a pediment, and the windows are sashes. | II |
| 66 and 68 Whitburn Street; 52.53608°N 2.42156°W | — | 18th century | A pair of shops in red brick with dentil eaves and a tile roof. They have two storeys, three bays, and rear wings. There are three doorways, and the windows are casements. | II |
| Fosters Arms Public House; 52.53430°N 2.41416°W | | 18th century | The public house is in brick with a parapet. There are three storeys and three bays. In the ground floor is a central doorway with a moulded surround and pilasters, flanked by bow windows, and a moulded cornice canopy over them. In the upper floor are sash windows with keyblocks. | II |
| Harpswood Bridge; 52.52100°N 2.45646°W | — | 18th century (probable) | The bridge carries the B4364 road over the Mor Brook. It is in stone, and consists of two segmental arches. The bridge has a cutwater and plain parapets. | II |
| Hillside House; 52.53276°N 2.41799°W | — | 18th century | A red brick house with a tile roof. It has three storeys with an attic and three bays, and a later two-storey south wing. The doorway has a moulded surround with pilasters and a pediment, and the windows are sashes with flat brick arches. | II |
| The Court; 52.53530°N 2.41895°W | — | 18th century | A red brick house with a tile roof, two storeys and three bays. On the front is a porch, sash windows with rusticated heads, and two dormers. | II |
| The Falcon Hotel; 52.53399°N 2.41411°W | | 18th century | The hotel is stuccoed with moulded stone eaves and a tile roof. The hotel is in three blocks, each with three bays. The left and centre blocks have three storeys, and the right block, with a similar height, has two storeys. The windows are sashes with moulded lintels. In the left block are two square bay windows with cornices, in the middle block is a doorway with a moulded canopy, and the right block has a carriage entrance. | II |
| The Rectory; 52.53299°N 2.41894°W | | c. 1770 | A red brick house with moulded, panelled, and stuccoed side pilasters, and a tile roof. There are three storeys and three bays. In the ground and middle floors the outer bays contain Venetian windows. The central doorway has half-round Tuscan pilasters, a moulded surround, a semicircular fanlight, and an open pediment, and above it is a round-headed window. In the top floor are three sash windows. | II* |
| 2 and 2A Bridge Street; 52.53406°N 2.41505°W | — | Late 18th century | A pair of brick shops with a coped parapet, three storeys and three bays. In the ground floor are 19th-century shop fronts with a moulded cornice, and above are sash windows with plain lintels and keyblocks. | II |
| 46 Cartway; 52.53448°N 2.41698°W | — | Late 18th century | A brick house with a tile roof, it has three storeys and one bay. The doorway has a plain surround, and the windows are sashes. | II |
| 69–71 Cartway; 52.53574°N 2.41760°W | — | Late 18th century | A row of three red brick houses with a tile roof. There are three storeys, and each house has two bays. There are three doorways with segmental heads, casement windows, those in the lower two floors with segmental heads, and to the right is a round-headed entry. | II |
| 3 Castle Terrace; 52.53469°N 2.41847°W | — | Late 18th century | A house in red-brown brick with dentil eaves and a tile roof. There are two storeys, an attic and a basement, and the house has a wedge-shaped plan. The windows are a mix of sashes and casements, at the end is a 20th-century bow window, at the rear is a canted bay window, and in the attic is a 20th-century dormer. | II |
| 26 East Castle Street; 52.53411°N 2.41864°W | — | Late 18th century | A red brick house with stone quoins, moulded stone eaves, a blocking course, and a slate roof. There are three storeys and three bays. The windows are sashes with channelled stuccoed lintels and keyblocks. Steps with railings lead up to the doorway on the right that has a moulded surround, a fanlight, a fluted frieze, and a cornice on consoles. | II |
| 28–31 Friars Street; 52.53661°N 2.41675°W | — | Late 18th century | A block of brick houses with a tile roof, an L-shaped plan, two storeys and attics, and six bays. It has a doorway with a moulded surround and a cornice hood on consoles, and another doorway with a plain surround and a gabled hood. There are five sash windows, one blocked window, and three dormers, two gabled and one with a hipped roof. | II |
| 37 High Street; 52.53513°N 2.41978°W | — | Late 18th century | A shop in red brick with a parapet, three storeys and two bays. In the ground floor is a modern shop front, and above are sash windows in flat brick arches. | II |
| 65 High Street; 52.53607°N 2.41976°W | — | Late 18th century | A stuccoed shop that has a tile roof with a parapeted gable on the left. There are three storeys and three bays. In the ground floor is a 19th-century shop front, and a round-headed entry to the right with voussoirs. In the middle floor are two canted oriel windows, to the right is a sash window in a moulded and voluted architrave, and in the top floor are sash windows with plain surrounds. | II |
| 75 High Street; 52.53635°N 2.41995°W | — | Late 18th century | A shop in red brick with moulded stone eaves and a tile roof. It has two storeys and an attic, and four bays. In the ground floor is a modern shop front and a round-headed doorway with a fanlight to the right. The upper floor contains sash windows, and in the attic are two gabled dormers. | II |
| 51 and 52 Mill Street; 52.53460°N 2.41397°W | — | Late 18th century | A house and a shop with probably a 17th-century core, they are in roughcast brick, and have brick eaves and a slate roof. There are three storeys and three bays. On the right is a doorway with a moulded surround and a rectangular fanlight, and to the left is a modern shop front with a doorway, also with a moulded surround, to its left. The windows are sashes in plain architraves. | II |
| 54 Mill Street; 52.53452°N 2.41401°W | — | Late 18th century | A house with probably a 17th-century core, in red brick with a coped tile roof. There are three storeys and four bays. The windows are sashes in moulded stone architraves, and to the left is an entrance with a segmental arch. In front are 19th-century cast iron railings. | II |
| 55 Mill Street; 52.53444°N 2.41415°W | — | Late 18th century | A red brick house with a parapet and a tile roof. There are three storeys and four bays. The windows are sashes in moulded stucco architraves. In the left bay is a carriageway with a segmental head, and to the right are cast iron railings. | II |
| 2 St Leonard's Close; 52.53671°N 2.41913°W | — | Late 18th century | A red brick house with a tile roof, two storeys and an attic, and a symmetrical front of three bays. The central doorway has a fanlight and a moulded canopy. The windows are sashes, and in the attic are gabled dormers. | II |
| 64 St Mary's Street; 52.53520°N 2.42083°W | — | Late 18th century | A red brick house that has a parapet with swept ends, three storeys, and two bays. The round-headed doorway has a radial fanlight and an open pediment, and to the right is a replacement shop window. In the upper floors are sash windows. | II |
| 10 St John's Street; 52.53392°N 2.41314°W | — | Late 18th century | A brick shop with earlier timber framing, brick eaves, and a tile roof. There are three storeys and two bays. In the ground floor is a doorway with a canted bay window to the right, and above these is a moulded canopy. The upper floors contain casement windows. | II |
| 10A and 11 St John's Street; 52.53390°N 2.41303°W | — | Late 18th century | A roughcast house with a tile roof, two storeys and an attic, and two bays. In the ground floor is a doorway with a canted bay window to the right and a casement window to the left. In the upper floor are sash windows, and there is a gabled dormer in the attic. | II |
| 16 St John's Street; 52.53387°N 2.41284°W | — | Late 18th century | A house, later an office, in red brick, with a coped parapet. There are three storeys and three bays. The windows are sashes, with moulded keyblocks and lintels. The doorway on the right return has a moulded surround. | II |
| 30 St Mary's Street; 52.53491°N 2.42286°W | — | Late 18th century | A red brick house on a plinth with moulded eaves, and a tile roof with coped gables. There are three storeys and a cellar, and a symmetrical front of three bays. Steps with railings lead up to a central doorway that has a moulded surround and a cornice hood on brackets. The windows are sashes. | II |
| 65 and 68 St Mary's Street; 52.53526°N 2.42071°W | — | Late 18th century | A pair of brick shops with string courses and a tile roof. They have two storeys with attics, and seven bays. In the ground floor is a central passageway flanked by late 19th-century shop fronts. The upper floor contains three sash windows and four blocked windows, and in the attic are four gabled dormers. | II |
| 12 West Castle Street; 52.53356°N 2.41985°W | — | Late 18th century | A brick house with side pilasters, moulded brick eaves, and a tile roof. There are two storeys and three bays. The central doorway has a moulded surround and a rectangular fanlight. The windows are sashes with moulded keyblocks and lintels, and the window above the doorway is blocked. | II |
| 64 and 65 Whitburn Street; 52.53608°N 2.42150°W | — | Late 18th century | A shop and an office in brick, No. 64 stuccoed, with moulded stucco and corbelled brick eaves, and a tile roof. There are two storeys and four bays. No. 64 has a doorway with a plain surround and a cornice hood. No. 65 has an arcade of three arches, and a recessed shop front including a doorway with pilasters, a cornice hood, and a rectangular fanlight. | II |
| Acacia House; 52.53497°N 2.42263°W | — | Late 18th century | A red brick house with the gable end facing the street; this has a pediment with moulded stone coping. There are three storeys and two bays facing the street. The windows are sashes, and in the left return is a doorway with a moulded surround and a canopy. | II |
| Black Horse Hotel; 52.53402°N 2.41473°W | | Late 18th century | A public house in brown brick with string courses, a stepped parapet. and an iron pub sign. There are three storeys and a front of two bays. In the ground and middle floors are sash windows, and casement windows in the top floor. | II |
| Severn Arms Hotel; 52.53418°N 2.41732°W | — | Late 18th century | The hotel is in red brick with moulded stone eaves and a tile roof. There are three storeys and three bays. In the ground floor is a doorway with Tuscan columns, a segmental fanlight and a pediment, and to the left is a canted oriel window. The upper floors contain sash windows with channelled lintels and keyblocks. | II |
| Barn, Stourbridge Road; 52.53039°N 2.41081°W | — | 1777 | The barn is in sandstone with a hipped tile roof. On the north front are two large doorways. The entrance is in the east front, and above it is a datestone. | II |
| Old Grammar School; 52.53718°N 2.41927°W | | 1785 | The former grammar school is in red brick with stone eaves and a tile roof. There are two storeys and three bays. Some of the windows are round-headed sashes in arched recesses, and there are flat-headed windows and Venetian windows. | II |
| The Almshouses; 52.53664°N 2.41996°W | | 1792 | The almshouses are in pink brick, and have two storeys and seven bays. The middle three bays project under a dentilled pediment containing an inscribed quatrefoil panel. The doorway and windows have pointed heads. Above the doorway is a sandstone canopy on consoles, the windows are casements, and most contain Y-tracery. | II |
| Church of St. Mary Magdalene; 52.53258°N 2.41873°W | | 1792–94 | The church was designed by Thomas Telford, and the apse was added in 1876 by Arthur Blomfield. It is built in grey sandstone, and consists of a nave, a short chancel with an apse, and a portico above which is a tower. The portico has Ionic columns and Doric pilasters, a triangular pediment, and a central doorway with a semicircular fanlight. The tower has a bell stage with Doric columns, an octagonal clock stage, and a copper-covered dome. | II* |
| Severn Bridge; 52.53421°N 2.41613°W | | 1795 | The bridge carries The B4363 road (Bridge Street) over the River Severn. It has a medieval origin, and was largely rebuilt at this date, with a further reconstruction by Thomas Telford in 1823. The bridge is in stone and has six semicircular arches, with four cutwaters rising to form refuges. | II |
| 1 Bridge Street; 52.53407°N 2.41527°W | — | c. 1800 | A house in Regency style, built in brown brick with a tile roof. There are three storeys and three bays. In the ground floor are three bow windows, and the upper floors contain sash windows. There are three doorways with fanlights, the left recessed, the right between bow windows. The left two doorways and the sash windows have stepped lintels with keyblocks. | II |
| 11 Mill Street; 52.53505°N 2.41332°W | | c. 1800 | A red brick house with a coped parapet. There are three storeys, three bays, and a two-storey one-bay wing to the left. The main doorway has Doric columns, a moulded surround, and a pediment with a shell in the tympanum. To the right is a smaller doorway with an engraved lintel, and the windows are sashes with channelled keyblocks and lintels. | II |
| 51 Cartway; 52.53488°N 2.41692°W | — | Late 18th or early 19th century | A brick house with dentil eaves and a tile roof. There are two storeys and an attic, and one bay. The doorway has a plain surround, the windows are replacement casements, and in the attic is a gabled dormer. | II |
| 1 Bank Street; 52.53446°N 2.41903°W | — | Early 19th century | A stuccoed house with pilasters, a cornice, and a parapet with balustraded panels. There are two storeys and two bays. The ground floor is rusticated, and the windows are sashes, the window in the ground floor with a keystone. The doorway has a moulded architrave, and a cornice on scrolled consoles. | II |
| 8A Bank Street; 52.53454°N 2.41916°W | — | Early 19th century | A red brick house with three storeys. To the left is a doorway with a moulded surround and a cornice hood. To the right is a three-storey canted bay window, and at the top is a gable. | II |
| 3 Bridge Street; 52.53405°N 2.41488°W | — | Early 19th century | A brick shop with earlier timber framing exposed at the sides, it has brick eaves, and a tile roof. There are two storeys with an attic, and one bay. The doorway has a plain surround, the windows are casements, and in the attic is a gabled dormer. | II |
| 5 Bridge Street; 52.53403°N 2.41463°W | — | Early 19th century | A house in red brick with a stepped gabled. There are three storeys and two bays. The windows are sashes with flat brick arches. | II |
| 2 Cartway; 52.53525°N 2.41833°W | — | Early 19th century | A brick house with dentil eaves and a tile roof. There are two storeys and an attic, and two bays. In the ground floor are two doorways with segmental heads, between them is a large window with a cornice hood on consoles, and a casement window with a segmental head. There are two similar casement windows in the upper floor, and gabled dormers in the attic. | II |
| 14 Cartway; 52.53554°N 2.41773°W | — | Early 19th century | A brick house with dentil eaves and a tile roof. There are two storeys, one bay, a recessed doorway with a segmental head, and modern casement windows. | II |
| 16 and 17 Cartway; 52.53561°N 2.41759°W | — | Early 19th century | No. 16 is a house and No. 17 is a shop; both are in red brick with dentil eaves, tiled roofs and two storeys. No. 16 has one bay, steps with railings lead up to a doorway with a segmental head. In the ground floor is a sash window with a segmental head and in the upper floor is a casement window. No. 17 is on a corner site with a gabled front of one bay and two bays on the return. On the front is a shop front incorporating a doorway, and above are windows with segmental heads. In the return are similar windows, a cellar door, and a gabled dormer. | II |
| 35 and 36 Cartway; 52.53486°N 2.41724°W | | Early 19th century | A pair of brick houses with dentil eaves and a tile roof. There are three storeys and three bays. The windows are sashes with lintels, most of which have channelled keyblocks. The doorways have moulded surrounds and cornices on consoles. | II |
| 4 Castle Terrace and Beaumaris House; 52.53466°N 2.41839°W | — | Early 19th century | The building is stuccoed with moulded stone eaves and a parapet. It has two storeys, and to the left is a three-storey wing with a stepped parapet. The building contains a doorway with a moulded surround, side sash windows, and a moulded cornice on a corbel table. Above it is a semicircular-headed window in a moulded architrave. | II |
| 6–8 Church Street; 52.53679°N 2.41949°W | — | Early 19th century | A row of three red brick houses with a hipped tile roof, and two storeys. Nos. 7 and 8 have one bay each, and doorways and windows with segmental heads. No. 6 has two wide bays, and two narrow bays on the right return with corner pilasters. The doorway has a hood on consoles, and there is a smaller door to the left. The windows are sashes, those on the right return having keyblocks. There are four gabled dormers. | II |
| 4 and 5 Danesford; 52.52216°N 2.40074°W | — | Early 19th century | A pair of brick houses with dentilled eaves and a tile roof. They have two storeys and a symmetrical front of four bays, the outer bays projecting slightly and gabled. The windows are casements with slightly pointed heads and hood moulds, those in the upper floor joining to become continuous. The doorways have moulded surrounds, pilasters, rectangular fanlights, and cornice hoods on consoles. | II |
| 10 East Castle Street; 52.53370°N 2.41889°W | — | Early 19th century | A brick house with a tile roof, three storeys and four bays. The doorway has a plain surround, a rectangular fanlight and side lights, and a dentilled stone cornice on consoles. The windows are sashes with channelled lintels and keyblocks. | II |
| 13 East Castle Street; 52.53374°N 2.41891°W | — | Early 19th century | A house in chequered brick with a tile roof, two storeys and two bays. The doorway has a moulded surround with pilasters, and a cornice hood on brackets, and there is a round-headed doorway to the right. The windows are sashes with channelled lintels. | II |
| 15 East Castle Street; 52.53310°N 2.41894°W | — | Early 19th century | A red brick house with three storeys and three bays. Between the bays are paired pilasters, and above the middle bay is an open pediment, below which is a segmental-headed window. The other windows are sashes with wedge lintels, the middle window in the middle floor has an iron balcony. The doorway, built out to the right, has a moulded surround, pilasters, a semicircular fanlight, and an open pediment. In the left bay is a large segmental-headed entrance. | II |
| 19 East Castle Street; 52.53350°N 2.41851°W | — | Early 19th century | A red brick house with a tile roof, two storeys and attics, and three bays. The central doorway has a plain architrave, a rectangular fanlight, and a moulded hood on modillion brackets. The windows are sashes, and in the attics are three gabled dormers with moulded pediments. | II |
| 21 East Castle Street; 52.53375°N 2.41852°W | — | Early 19th century | A red brick house with a tile roof, two storeys with attics, and four bays. The doorway has a fanlight and a hood on brackets. The windows are sashes with flat heads and keyblocks, there is a blocked window in the upper floor, and in the attics are flat-roofed dormers. | II |
| 22 East Castle Street; 52.53385°N 2.41851°W | — | Early 19th century | A stuccoed house with an eaves cornice and flanking pilasters. There are three storeys and four bays. The doorway has a cornice on consoles, and there is a smaller round-headed doorway to the left. The windows are sashes in architraves. | II |
| 23 East Castle Street; 52.53394°N 2.41853°W | — | Early 19th century | A remodelling of an earlier house, it is stuccoed, with a belt course, and a tile roof. There are two storeys and an attic, and three bays. The doorway has side lights, the windows are sashes in moulded architraves, and there are three gabled dormers. | II |
| 24 East Castle Street; 52.53401°N 2.41857°W | — | Early 19th century | A remodelling of an earlier house, the lower storey is stuccoed, the upper storey is roughcast, and the roof is tiled. There are two storeys and an attic, and two bays. The central doorway has a moulded surround and a cornice. The windows are sashes in architraves, and in the attic are two gabled dormers. | II |
| 25 East Castle Street; 52.53406°N 2.41858°W | — | Early 19th century | A remodelling of an earlier house, plastered, with a tile roof. There are two storeys and an attic, and three bays. On the left is a doorway with side lights, and a cornice on brackets. The windows are sashes, and in the attics are two gabled dormers. | II |
| 27 East Castle Street; 52.53421°N 2.41867°W | — | Early 19th century | A red brick house with brick eaves, a slate roof, and three storeys. The doorway has a moulded surround and a small hood, and the windows are sashes with stuccoed lintels. | II |
| 28 and 29 East Castle Street; 52.53428°N 2.41875°W | — | Early 19th century | A pair of houses remodelled from an earlier house, they are plastered with quoins, a sill band, and a tile roof. There are two storeys and attics, and four bays. The doorways have plain surrounds, the windows are sashes, and in the attics are four gabled dormers. | II |
| 33 East Castle Street; 52.53442°N 2.41917°W | — | Early 19th century | The building, at one time a bank, is stuccoed, with pilasters, moulded sill bands, an eaves cornice, and a parapet with honeycomb panels. The building is curved on a corner site, and has two storeys, the ground floor rusticated, and five bays. The recessed doorway is on the corner, and the windows are sashes in moulded architraves. | II |
| 24 High Street; 52.53593°N 2.42014°W | — | Early 19th century | A brick shop with quoins, a dentil cornice, and a parapet. There are three storeys and two bays. In the ground floor is a modern shop front, and above are sash windows with channelled lintels and keyblocks. | II |
| 44 and 45 High Street; 52.53492°N 2.41925°W | — | Early 19th century | A pair of houses with an earlier timber framed core, later used for other purposes. They are stuccoed, on a plinth, and have a coped parapet. There are three storeys with a basement to the right, and three bays. In the upper floors are sash windows. In the ground floor, the right part has steps with railings leading up to a doorway, to its right is a bow window, and beneath the bow window, in the basement, is another doorway with a shop window to the right. To the left is a modern shop front. | II |
| 82 High Street; 52.53683°N 2.42033°W | — | Early 19th century | A shop in red brick with a stone eaves cornice and a tile roof. It has three storeys and three bays. In the ground floor is a modern shop front, and above are sash windows, those in the middle floor with channelled keyblocks and moulded lintels. | II |
| 9 and 10 Listley Street; 52.53458°N 2.42044°W | — | Early 19th century | A brick building that has a tile roof with coped end gables, two storeys, and five bays. There are arcade motifs in both floors. In the centre is an archway with a segmental head, and the other arches have round heads. In the ground floor, to the left of the doorway is a shop front with a bow window, and to the right is a square bay window and a doorway. In the upper floor, four of the arches contain windows, and the other is blind. | II |
| 7–10 Mill Street; 52.53493°N 2.41339°W | — | Early 19th century | A row of four brick houses on plinths with tiled roofs. No. 7 has three storeys and three bays. The central doorway has a rectangular fanlight, and a hood on brackets. To the right is a round-headed archway with a rusticated surround, voussoirs and a keystone. The windows are sashes with channelled lintels. Nos. 8–10 are lower, with two storeys, and one bay each. The ground floor windows have segmental heads, as do two of the doorways, and the other doorway has a cornice hood. | II |
| 46 and 47 Mill Street; 52.53501°N 2.41364°W | — | Early 19th century | A pair of houses in brick encasing earlier timber framing, which is exposed on the right return. They have quoins, moulded stone eaves, and a tile roof. There are two storeys and attic, and five bays. In the first four bays are sash windows with engraved lintels, the fifth contains a segmental-headed window in each floor, and in the attic are five gable dormers. The two main doorways have cornices on decorative consoles, and to the right is a smaller segmental-headed doorway with a four-light fanlight. | II |
| 18 and 19 Pound Street; 52.53495°N 2.42373°W | — | Early 19th century | A pair of houses that have earlier timber framing encased in brick and plastered, with dentil eaves and a tile roof. Each house has a single storey and attic, and one bay. The doorway and window of No. 18 have segmental heads, and those of No. 19 have flat heads and hoods. In the attics are gabled dormers. | II |
| 40–42 River Side; 52.53492°N 2.41683°W | — | Early 19th century | A row of three brick houses with possibly an earlier core. They have dentilled eaves, a tile roof, two storeys and attics. No. 40 has a doorway and sash windows with segmental heads. No. 41 has round-arched recesses in the ground floor, one blank, and one containing a doorway; in the upper floor are two blind segmental arches, in the middle between them are casement windows, and in the roof is a gabled dormer. No. 42 has a doorway with a segmental head, sash windows, the window in the ground floor in a round-arched recess, and a gabled dormer. | II |
| 5 St John's Street; 52.53400°N 2.41357°W | — | Early 19th century | A red brick house with a tile roof, two storeys and two bays. The doorway, to the right, has a plain surround and a canopy, and the windows are sashes with moulded lintels and keyblocks. | II |
| 11 St Mary's Street; 52.53526°N 2.42126°W | — | Early 19th century | A house, later a hotel, in red brick encasing earlier timber framing, with a tile roof. There are three storeys and three bays. The doorway has a moulded canopy on consoles, and the windows are modern casements. | II |
| 21 St Mary's Street; 52.53513°N 2.42194°W | — | Early 19th century | A brick house with bands, dentilled eaves, and a tile roof. There are three storeys and two bays. The windows are sashes, and the doorway has a cornice hood on consoles. | II |
| 22 St Mary's Street; 52.53509°N 2.42206°W | — | Early 19th century | A brick house with bands, dentilled eaves, and a tile roof. There are three storeys and three bays. The windows are sashes with segmental heads, the doorway has a moulded surround and a cornice hood on consoles, and there is a passage door to the left. | II |
| 43 and 44 St Mary's Street; 52.53480°N 2.42264°W | — | Early 19th century | A pair of houses in brick over earlier timber framing with coped eaves and a tile roof. There are two storeys and each house has one bay. In the outer part of each house is a doorway with a moulded surround, and the windows are casements. | II |
| 62 and 63 St Mary's Street; 52.53516°N 2.42102°W | — | Early 19th century | A pair of red brick houses with dentil eaves, and three storeys. No. 62 has three bays; No. 63 is lower and has one bay. The doorways have hoods on consoles, and the windows are sashes, those in No. 63 with segmental heads. | II |
| 69 St Mary's Street; 52.53529°N 2.42045°W | — | Early 19th century | A brick building with dentilled eaves, and a tile roof. It has three storeys and one bay. In the ground floor is a recessed doorway with a canted bay window to the right, and a plain hood above them. In the upper floors are casement windows. | II |
| 2 Waterloo Terrace; 52.53483°N 2.41882°W | — | Early 19th century | A shop in brown brick with sandstone dressings, a moulded stone cornice, and a blocking course. There are three storeys and three bays, the middle bay slightly projecting. In the ground floor is a late 19th-century shop front, and above the windows are sashes, the middle window in the middle bay having a moulded architrave and a pediment on consoles. | II |
| 24–30 Whitburn Street; 52.53587°N 2.42258°W | | Early 19th century | A row of seven cottages that contain earlier material, with some stonework at the rear. They are in red brick, on plinths, with dentil eaves and tile roofs. They have two storeys and one or two bays each. Steps lead up to doors with hoods. Most of the windows are casements, some are sashes, and there is onecross window and one nine-pane shop window. | II |
| 7–9 and 12 Underhill; 52.53363°N 2.41726°W | — | Early 19th century | The building is in brick with roofs of tile and slate. The middle part has two storeys, eight bays, and two pedimented gables containing round-headed windows. The outer parts have three storeys and three bays each, with rusticated ground floors, and round-headed arches containing round-headed windows and flanked by pilasters. | II |
| Bear Inn; 52.53722°N 2.42087°W | | Early 19th century | The public house is in brick with dentil eaves and tiled roofs. The main block has three storeys and three bays. In the ground floor is an arched passageway to the left, a canted bay window to the right, and sash windows in the upper floors. To the right is a wing with one storey and an attic, and two bays. In the left bay is a doorway with a canopy, to the right is a canted bay window, and in the attic are two gabled dormers. | II |
| Bandon Arms Hotel; 52.53587°N 2.41267°W | | Early 19th century | A brick hotel with a tile roof. It has three storeys and five bays, with a gable above the right three bays. The round-headed doorway has a flat hood, and the windows are sashes with segmental heads. | II |
| Bell and Talbot Inn; 52.53524°N 2.42449°W | | Early 19th century | The public house is in brick with dentilled eaves and a tile roof. There are three storeys and three bays. The main doorway has a plain surround, a fanlight, and a cornice hood on brackets, and there is a smaller door to the left. The windows are sashes, and between them in the middle floor is a stuccoed panel with side pilasters, a cornice and a segmental head, containing a relief depicting a bell and two dogs. | II |
| Fox Inn and 36–45 Hospital Street; 52.53370°N 2.41165°W | | Early 19th century | A row of ten houses with a public house attached at right angles on the left. They are in brown brick, the public house painted, and have dentil eaves and tiled roofs. All have three storeys, some houses have one bay, some have two, and the public house has four. The windows are sashes with segmental heads, and the doorways have hoods. | II |
| Golden Lion Public House; 52.53690°N 2.42036°W | | Early 19th century | The public house is in brick on a stone plinth, with a band, a dentilled eaves cornice, a tile roof, and two storeys with an attic. In the centre, steps with iron railings lead up to a doorway with a moulded canopy, and there is a plain doorway to the left. In each floor are two sash windows with wedge lintels, and in the attic are two gabled dormers. At the rear is older material and two gables. | II |
| Grange Cottage; 52.52216°N 2.40021°W | — | Early 19th century | Originally a gate lodge to Danesford Grange, it is in brick with moulded bands, sprocket eaves and a tiled roof. It has two storeys, shaped gables with stone copings, and casement windows with rusticated surrounds. | II |
| Greenacres; 52.51696°N 2.38762°W | — | Early 19th century | A brick house with a tile roof, it has two storeys with an attic, and a front of three bays. The central bay is gabled and projects slightly. It contains a doorway with a moulded surround, a fanlight, an open pediment, and sidelights, all in an arched recess. Above is a Venetian window, the gable contains a lunette, and in the other bays are sash windows. | II |
| Former Hen and Chickens Inn; 52.53537°N 2.42055°W | | Early 19th century | The public house is in brick with sprocket eaves, a tile roof, two storeys and an attic. On the front is a canted bay window on the left, a window with fluted pilasters on the right, and the entrance to a courtyard in between. Above are two sash windows and two gabled dormers, and the entrance is in the courtyard. (Note: Street View in November 2017 shows that the name has been changed to The Friars Inn.) | II |
| HSBC bank 52.53476°N 2.41959°W | | Early 19th century | The bank, on a corner site, is stuccoed, with a blocking course and moulded stone eaves. There are three storeys, two bays on High Street and three on Listley Street. The ground floor is rusticated, and above there are pilasters between the bays and at the sides. The windows are sashes. | II |
| Municipal Offices; 52.53664°N 2.41873°W | | Early 19th century | The offices are in red brick, with pilasters, three storeys, and three bays. In the centre is a porch with Ionic columns and a moulded pediment. The windows are sashes, those in the lower two floors with wedge lintels. | II |
| New Inn; 52.53535°N 2.42066°W | | Early 19th century | The public house is in brick with dentilled eaves, a tile roof, two storeys and an attic. On the front is a two-storey canted bay window, to the left is a round-headed window with a keystone, and to the right is an entry with an elliptical head. In the upper floor are sash windows, there are two gabled dormers in the attic, and the entrance is on the side. | II |
| Premises occupied by Messrs Tanner; 52.53529°N 2.42054°W | — | Early 19th century | A brick warehouse with a tile roof and two storeys. There is a covered way on the left, and a loading door in the upper floor. | II |
| Shakespeare Hotel; 52.53426°N 2.41931°W | | Early 19th century | The public house is in brick with a tile roof and two storeys. The entrance front has a gable on the left, and contains casement windows and a doorway with a moulded surround and a cornice hood. Along the right return are casement and sash windows, and a doorway with pilasters and a cornice hood. | II |
| The Watch-Tower, The Chantry; 52.51613°N 2.38598°W | | Early 19th century | A folly in red brick, partly stuccoed, on a sandstone crag. It includes two small embattled towers with arrow slits, windows in pointed arched recesses, and a diamond-shaped clock face. | II |
| The Vine Inn; 52.53422°N 2.41421°W | | Early 19th century | The public house is in sandstone with a brick front, brick eaves, and a tile roof. There are three storeys and three bays. In the right part of the ground floor is a canted bay window, and the central doorway has a segmental head. The other windows are sashes, those in the upper floors with engraved lintels. | II |
| Warehouse, Bridge Street; 52.53428°N 2.41680°W | | Early 19th century | The warehouse is in brown brick, and has three storeys and four bays, the right bay receding. It contains a hoist door, a larger doorway with a segmental head, and sash windows. | II |
| White Lion Inn; 52.53428°N 2.41958°W | | Early 19th century | The public house is in brick with bands and a tile roof. It has two storeys and an attic, and three bays. Steps with railings lead up to the central doorway that has a moulded surround and a cornice hood. The windows are sashes with keyblocks and engraved lintels, and to the right is an archway with an elliptical head. | II |
| Quatford Castle; 52.52168°N 2.39176°W | — | 1829–30 | A country house in the form of a castle, it is built in red sandstone and brick, and is embattled. There are four storeys and four bays. Features include a five-storey tower with machicolations, arrow slits, curtain walls with bastions, earth ramparts, and embattled outbuildings. | II |
| 25 High Street; 52.53585°N 2.42011°W | — | Early to mid 19th century | A stuccoed shop that has a dentilled pediment with acroteria, and three storeys. In the ground floor is a modern shop front, above which is a decorative cornice on foliated consoles. In the middle floor is a three-light canted oriel window, and the other windows are sashes. | II |
| 20 and 21 Railway Street; 52.53332°N 2.42119°W | — | 1840 | A shop on a curved corner site and an adjoining house in brick with a tile roof. There are two storeys and five bays. On the corner is a curved shop front, there are two doorways with plain surrounds, and the windows are sashes, most with stone cornice hoods on consoles. | II |
| Bridgnorth station 52.53056°N 2.42063°W | | c. 1840 | The railway station building is in rusticated stone with a moulded cornice, and a tile roof. There is a single storey, the central block has three projecting wings with shaped gables and ball finials, and there are flanking wings with parapets. The outer projecting wings have a canted bay window with mullioned and transomed windows. and in the central wing is a doorway with a semicircular head, a keystone and a segmental fanlight. | II |
| Ebenezer Row; 52.53226°N 2.42068°W | — | c. 1840 | A row of nine red brick houses with tiled roofs, they have two storeys and one bay each. All the houses have a doorway with a moulded surround and a stone cornice hood, and sash windows. | II |
| Baptist Chapel; 52.53398°N 2.41995°W | | 1842 | The chapel is in brown brick with a stuccoed front and a panelled parapet. There are three bays, with pilasters at the ends, and double pilasters in the centre. In the centre is a doorway with a moulded surround, pilasters, and a cornice on consoles. The windows have moulded architraves, and along the sides are pilasters and round-headed windows. | II |
| Fort Pendlestone, sluice and leat bridge 52.54627°N 2.40868°W | | 1845 | Originally a textile mill, to which an engine house and boiler room were added in 1866, it has since been converted into apartments. The building is in red sandstone and has tile roofs. The factory range has two storeys, eight bays, corner turrets, one with an embattled parapet, buttresses with gabled tops, and mullioned and transomed windows. At the north end is a water mill house, and there is a warehouse at right angles. To the east is the former manager's house with two storeys, three bays, and a projecting office wing. To the north is a sluice and a bridge over the leat. | II |
| 34 Cartway; 52.53493°N 2.41739°W | — | 19th century | A brick house on earlier timber framing, with a tile roof. It has a single storey with a gabled attic, the timber framing exposed in the attic. There is one bay, a doorway with a plain surround, and casement windows. | II |
| 11 East Castle Street; 52.53361°N 2.41895°W | — | Mid 19th century | A red brick house with a slate roof, two storeys and two bays. In the right bay is a doorway with a plain surround, side lights, a rectangular fanlight, and a moulded stucco cornice on consoles. Above it is a sash window with a channelled lintel and a keyblock. In the left bay is a three-light window, and a canted oriel window above. | II |
| 12 East Castle Street; 52.53354°N 2.41892°W | — | Mid 19th century | A red brick house with blue brick chequerwork on the front, corbelled eaves, a tile roof, and two storeys. The doorway has a plain surround, side lights, and a fanlight, and to the left is a three-light window; both have a moulded stucco cornice on consoles. In the upper floor are three sash windows in moulded stucco architraves. | II |
| 14 East Castle Street; 52.53337°N 2.41895°W | — | Mid 19th century | A red brick house with blue brick chequerwork on the front, bands, a hipped tile roof, and three storeys. The doorway on the right has a moulded surround with pilasters, side lights, a rectangular fanlight, and a moulded cornice on consoles. To the left in the middle floor is a canted three-light oriel window, and the other windows are sashes with wedge lintels and keyblocks. | II |
| 84 and 85 High Street; 52.53699°N 2.42040°W | | 19th century | A pair of shops, stuccoed over earlier timber framing, with bands and a tile roof. There are two storeys and attics, and two bays. In the ground floor are modern shop fronts, in the upper floor are casement windows, and in the attics are gabled dormers. | II |
| 38–40 St Mary's Street; 52.53470°N 2.42295°W | — | 19th century | A red brick building with one storey and an attic. On the front are two recessed panels with corbels, each containing two two-light mullioned windows. In the centre is a passageway with a pointed arched head and a moulded stone cornice hood. At the rear is a 17th-century timber framed house with plaster infill and two storeys, and containing casement windows and two doorways. | II |
| United Methodist and Congregational Church; 52.53516°N 2.41835°W | | 1853 | The church is in blue brick, painted on the front. The front has three bays, it is pedimented, and there are four pilasters. In the centre is a doorway with a cornice hood on consoles, and there are three round-headed windows. In the pediment is a dated and inscribed stone. | II |
| New Market Hall; 52.53456°N 2.41982°W | | 1855–59 | Built as a market hall and assembly rooms, it is in Italianate style, and in red white and blue brick with a hipped slate roof. It has one and two storeys, and at the northeast corner is a three-storey tower. In both storeys are round-arched openings, above the windows in the upper storey are oculi, and at the top is a Lombard frieze and a cornice on corbels. The top stage of the tower has an arcade of lancets on each face, above which is an oculus, an arcade of smaller windows, and a hipped roof with a wrought iron weathervane. | II |
| St Nicholas' Church, Oldbury; 52.52537°N 2.42787°W | | 1858 | The church was rebuilt on the site of a medieval church, incorporating some earlier material. It is in sandstone with tile roofs. The church consists of a nave, a north aisles, a south porch, and a chancel with a south vestry. On the west gable is a bellcote with four columns and an octagonal cap with lucarnes and a metal weathervane. | II |
| 1 East Castle Street; 52.53426°N 2.41904°W | — | Mid to late 19th century | A brick house with a tile roof, two storeys and seven bays. The doorway has a moulded surround, pilasters, a rectangular fanlight, and a cornice hood. The windows are sashes, those in the ground floor with channelled lintels and keyblocks. | II |
| Sabrina Fountain; 52.53234°N 2.41980°W | | 1881 | The drinking fountain in the Castle Grounds is a memorial to Henry Whitmore, a local politician. It is in granite, and has an octagonal base with a round fountain bowl. On this is a square pedestal with corner columns, a cornice, and on the sides are bronze shields, a bust, and lions' masks. Above this is a small pedestal with four bronze dolphins, surmounted by a bronze statue depicting Sabrina. | II |
| Palmer's Hospital; 52.53659°N 2.41892°W | | 1889 | The hospital was founded in 1679 but completely rebuilt in 1889. It has two storeys and a U-shaped plan around three sides of a courtyard. The ground floor is in sandstone, and the upper floor is timber framed with stuccoed brick infill. Across the far end is a timber balcony. | II |
| Cliff Railway Station and Stoneway Guest House; 52.53415°N 2.41762°W | | 1892 | The station is at the lower end of Bridgnorth Cliff Railway, and its former restaurant is a guest house. The building is in brick with tile roofs, and has three storeys, the station being in the lowest storey, with the guest house jettied above it. The entrance to the station is in the centre and has pilasters, a fanlight, and a keystone. The guest house has five bays and sash windows, those in the lower floor having segmental arches. | II |
| Upper Station; 52.53442°N 2.41823°W | | 1892 | The station is at the upper end of Bridgnorth Cliff Railway. It is in red brick with stone dressings and applied timber framing, and has a roof of tile and slate. The station is in Jacobethan style, with two storeys, a canted gabled bay to the left, a two-storey tower with a pyramidal roof and an ironwork finial to the right, and further to the right is a flat-roofed section over the ticket office. | II |
| Conduit head, East Castle Street; 52.53436°N 2.41912°W | | c. 1900 | The conduit head is in a niche in the wall of a former bank. It is in cast iron and has a circular plan, a fluted upright with three lions' heads towards the top, a domed gadrooned top with a finial, and a tap on the right side. | II |
| Conduit head, Westgate; 52.53593°N 2.42964°W | — | c. 1900 | The conduit head is by the side of a road. It is in cast iron and has a circular plan, a fluted upright with three lions' heads towards the top, a domed gadrooned top with a finial, and a tap on the right side. | II |
| Former National Provincial Bank; 52.53603°N 2.42022°W | — | 1905 | The bank is in ashlar stone and has a gable with applied timber framing. There are two storeys and a jettied attic. The windows are mullioned and transomed, in the upper storey they are oriel windows. The doorway has a moulded surround. | II |
| North Gate; 52.53700°N 2.42058°W | | 1910 | The gateway is in sandstone, spanning the road, and enclosing a brick structure of 1740. There are three round-headed arches, the central arch larger for vehicles, and the outer arches for pedestrians. Flanking the central arch are buttresses. Above are three mullioned and transomed windows, and at the top is an embattled parapet. | II |
| War memorial 52.53155°N 2.41938°W | | 1922 | The war memorial stands in the Castle Grounds. It has a red sandstone pedestal on a stepped base, and is surmounted by a bronze statue depicting a soldier is battledress with an outstretched arm. On the pedestal are bronze plaques inscribed with the names of those lost in the two World Wars. | II |
| Telephone kiosk, Bridge Street; 52.53405°N 2.41452°W | | 1935 | A K6 type telephone kiosk, designed by Giles Gilbert Scott. Constructed in cast iron with a square plan and a dome, it has three unperforated crowns in the top panels. | II |
| Oldbury Wells School (East); 52.53058°N 2.42668°W | — | 1958 | The east part of the school has a concrete frame with concrete panels, some brick and other panels. Most of the roofs are flat, and the school has one or two storeys, the assembly hall and library being of double height. Other features include two projecting circular structures with canted tops, and a prominent boiler house chimney. | II |
| Oldbury Wells School (West); 52.52997°N 2.42868°W | | 1958 | The west part of the school is built in reinforced concrete with brick infill, and has a flat roof. The main block has two storeys and eleven bays, there is a single-storey kitchen to the east. Bays six and seven are recessed and form the entrance. Features include a staircase projection, a concrete boiler house chimney, and a water tower. | II |
| 54 High Street; 52.53545°N 2.41947°W | — | Undated | A shop with a front of applied timber framing and a side wall of original timber framing. It has three storeys and one bay. In the ground floor is a modern shop front, in the middle floor is a five-light window, and in the top floor a two-light window. | II |

== Notes and references ==
=== Sources ===
- Historic England, "Church of St Leonard, Bridgnorth (1178124)", National Heritage List for England
- Historic England, "Church of St Mary Magdalene, Bridgnorth (1374848)", National Heritage List for England
- Historic England, "The Castle, Bridgnorth (1053985)", National Heritage List for England
- Historic England, "Bridgnorth Castle (1004783)", National Heritage List for England
- Historic England, "Half Moon Battery, Bridgnorth (1053945)", National Heritage List for England
- Historic England, "Fragment of Town Walls, Bridgnorth (1053983)", National Heritage List for England
- Historic England, "Fragment of Town Walls to south of remains of Half Moon Battery, Bridgnorth (1367492)", National Heritage List for England
- Historic England, "Fragment of Town Walls to west of Postern Gate, Bridgnorth (1307616)", National Heritage List for England
- Historic England, "Wall forming part of former Franciscan Priory, Central basement of Carpet factory, Bridgnorth (1053711)", National Heritage List for England
- Historic England, "British Legion Club, Bridgnorth (1367864)", National Heritage List for England
- Historic England, "No. 15 Bridge Street, Bridgnorth (1367865)", National Heritage List for England
- Historic England, "The Chantry, Bridgnorth (1177870)", National Heritage List for England
- Historic England, "Nos. 21 and 22 Northgate, Bridgnorth (1053941)", National Heritage List for England
- Historic England, "No. 15 St John's Street, Bridgnorth (1177984)", National Heritage List for England
- Historic England, "Baxter's Cottage, Bridgnorth (1053956)", National Heritage List for England
- Historic England, "Nos. 41–43 Mill Street, Bridgnorth (1367495)", National Heritage List for England
- Historic England, "No. 25 Northgate, Bridgnorth (1053943)", National Heritage List for England
- Historic England, "Nos. 5 and 6 St Mary's Street, Bridgnorth (1053916)", National Heritage List for England
- Historic England, "Nos. 45 and 46 St Mary's Street, Bridgnorth (1295119)", National Heritage List for England
- Historic England, "Nos. 50–54 St Mary's Street, Bridgnorth (1374839)", National Heritage List for England
- Historic England, "Carpenters Arms Public House, Bridgnorth (1374845)", National Heritage List for England
- Historic England, "Bishop Percy's House, Bridgnorth (1367867)", National Heritage List for England
- Historic England, "No. 48 Cartway, Bridgnorth (1379824)", National Heritage List for England
- Historic England, "King's Head Public House, Bridgnorth (1374844)", National Heritage List for England
- Historic England, "No. 16 High Street and The Crown and Raven Public House, Bridgnorth (1177440)", National Heritage List for England
- Historic England, "Nos. 1 and 3 Stourbridge Road, Bridgnorth (1053928)", National Heritage List for England
- Historic England, "Northgate Cafe, Bridgnorth (1053987)", National Heritage List for England
- Historic England, "Parlor's Hall, Bridgnorth (1053975)", National Heritage List for England
- Historic England, "Grammar School House, Bridgnorth (1053955)", National Heritage List for England
- Historic England, "Nos. 3 and 4 High Street, Bridgnorth (1307441)", National Heritage List for England
- Historic England, "No. 51 High Street, Bridgnorth (1177609)", National Heritage List for England
- Historic England, "No. 53 High Street, Bridgnorth (1307369)", National Heritage List for England
- Historic England, "No. 57 High Street, Bridgnorth (1307334)", National Heritage List for England
- Historic England, "No. 56 St Mary's Street, Bridgnorth (1178332)", National Heritage List for England
- Historic England, "Governor's House, Bridgnorth (1053993)", National Heritage List for England
- Historic England, "Raven Hotel, Bridgnorth (1295026)", National Heritage List for England
- Historic England, "Nos. 33–36 High Street, Bridgnorth (1053964)", National Heritage List for England
- Historic England, "Nos. 54–57 Cartway, Bridgnorth (1053188)", National Heritage List for England
- Historic England, "No. 32 Friar's Street, Bridgnorth (1053997)", National Heritage List for England
- Historic England, "Nos. 36–38 Mill Street, Bridgnorth (1177745)", National Heritage List for England
- Historic England, "Nos. 1–7 Northgate and No. 16 Moat Street, Bridgnorth (1053939)", National Heritage List for England
- Historic England, "Nos. 8–10 Northgate, Bridgnorth (1053940)", National Heritage List for England
- Historic England, "No. 1 Waterloo Terrace, Bridgnorth (1053929)", National Heritage List for England
- Historic England, "No. 4 Waterloo Terrace, Bridgnorth (1053930)", National Heritage List for England
- Historic England, "Nos. 7 and 8 Waterloo Terrace, Bridgnorth (1053931)", National Heritage List for England
- Historic England, "Premises occupied by the Shropshire Star, Bridgnorth (1053944)", National Heritage List for England
- Historic England, "Swan Inn, Bridgnorth (1053969)", National Heritage List for England
- Historic England, "Town Hall, Bridgnorth (1053998)", National Heritage List for England
- Historic England, "No. 48 Mill Street, Bridgnorth (1177762)", National Heritage List for England
- Historic England, "No. 32 Cartway, Bridgnorth (1053182)", National Heritage List for England
- Historic England, "Diamond Hall, Bridgnorth (1367483)", National Heritage List for England
- Historic England, "No. 11 (Incorporating Former No. 12) and No. 6 (Incorporating Former No. 7) Cartway, Bridgnorth (1177129)", National Heritage List for England
- Historic England, "Nos. 4 and 5 East Castle Street, Bridgnorth (1053990)", National Heritage List for England
- Historic England, "No. 35 Mill Street, Bridgnorth (1367494)", National Heritage List for England
- Historic England, "No. 39 Mill Street, Bridgnorth (1053977)", National Heritage List for England
- Historic England, "No. 40 Mill Street, Bridgnorth (1177753)", National Heritage List for England
- Historic England, "Railings and gate at the Chantry, Bridgnorth (1053946)", National Heritage List for England
- Historic England, "Chantry Cottage, Bridgnorth (1177878)", National Heritage List for England
- Historic England, "No. 42 Cartway, Bridgnorth (1307565)", National Heritage List for England
- Historic England, "No. 43 Cartway, Bridgnorth (1367866)", National Heritage List for England
- Historic England, "No. 3 Church Street, Bridgnorth (1367497)", National Heritage List for England
- Historic England, "No. 26 High Street, Bridgnorth (1177472)", National Heritage List for England
- Historic England, "No. 33 High Street, Bridgnorth (1053963)", National Heritage List for England
- Historic England, "No. 43 High Street, Bridgnorth (1367487)", National Heritage List for England
- Historic England, "No. 50 High Street, Bridgnorth (1053968)", National Heritage List for England
- Historic England, "No. 73 High Street, Bridgnorth (1053971)", National Heritage List for England
- Historic England, "Nos. 1 and 2 Mill Street, Bridgnorth (1177718)", National Heritage List for England
- Historic England, "Nos. 3–5 Mill Street, Bridgnorth (1367493)", National Heritage List for England
- Historic England, "No. 53 Mill Street, Bridgnorth (1307282)", National Heritage List for England
- Historic England, "No. 3 St John's Street, Bridgnorth (1177937)", National Heritage List for England
- Historic England, "No. 7 St John's Street, Bridgnorth (1367481)", National Heritage List for England
- Historic England, "No. 8 St John's Street, Bridgnorth (1295270)", National Heritage List for England
- Historic England, "Nos. 5 and 6 Waterloo Terrace, Bridgnorth (1295033)", National Heritage List for England
- Historic England, "No. 63 Whitburn Street, Bridgnorth (1180234)", National Heritage List for England
- Historic England, "Black Boy Public House, Bridgnorth (1177248)", National Heritage List for England
- Historic England, "The Court, Bridgnorth (1367488)", National Heritage List for England
- Historic England, "Westwood House, Bridgnorth (1350365)", National Heritage List for England
- Historic England, "No. 23 High Street, Bridgnorth (1177456)", National Heritage List for England
- Historic England, "Nos. 26 and 27 St Leonard's Close, Bridgnorth (1367485)", National Heritage List for England
- Historic England, "Northgate House, Bridgnorth (1177434)", National Heritage List for England
- Historic England, "Nos. 7 and 8 Bridge Street, Bridgnorth (1177080)", National Heritage List for England
- Historic England, "Nos. 18–23 Cartway, Bridgnorth (1307587)", National Heritage List for England
- Historic England, "Nos. 24–26 Cartway, Bridgnorth (1053181)", National Heritage List for England
- Historic England, "Nos. 29–31 Cartway, Bridgnorth (1177150)", National Heritage List for England
- Historic England, "No. 37 Cartway, Bridgnorth (1053184)", National Heritage List for England
- Historic England, "Nos. 38–40 Cartway, Bridgnorth (1177167)", National Heritage List for England
- Historic England, "No. 41 Cartway, Bridgnorth (1053185)", National Heritage List for England
- Historic England, "No. 45 Cartway, Bridgnorth (1177178)", National Heritage List for England
- Historic England, "No. 47 Cartway, Bridgnorth (1307569)", National Heritage List for England
- Historic England, "No. 53 Cartway, Bridgnorth (1177236)", National Heritage List for England
- Historic England, "Nos. 59–64 Cartway, Bridgnorth (1367868)", National Heritage List for England
- Historic England, "Nos. 65 and 66 Cartway, Bridgnorth (1177254)", National Heritage List for England
- Historic England, "No. 67 Cartway, Bridgnorth (1053189)", National Heritage List for England
- Historic England, "No. 68 Cartway, Bridgnorth (1053981)", National Heritage List for England
- Historic England, "No. 97 Cartway, Bridgnorth (1053984)", National Heritage List for England
- Historic England, "No. 7 Castle Terrace, Bridgnorth (1367496)", National Heritage List for England
- Historic England, "Nos. 1 and 2 Church Street, Bridgnorth (1053988)", National Heritage List for England
- Historic England, "Nos. 2 and 3 East Castle Street, Bridgnorth (1177298)", National Heritage List for England
- Historic England, "Nos. 17 and 17A East Castle Street, Bridgnorth (1376782)", National Heritage List for England
- Historic England, "No. 20 East Castle Street, Bridgnorth (1053994)", National Heritage List for England
- Historic England, "Nos. 30–32 East Castle Street, Bridgnorth (1299554)", National Heritage List for England
- Historic England, "Nos. 5 and 6 High Street, Bridgnorth (1367464)", National Heritage List for England
- Historic England, "Nos. 11–13 High Street, Bridgnorth (1053999)", National Heritage List for England
- Historic England, "Nos. 27 and 28 High Street, Bridgnorth (1054002)", National Heritage List for England
- Historic England, "No. 29 High Street, Bridgnorth (1053959)", National Heritage List for England
- Historic England, "No. 30 High Street, Bridgnorth (1053960)", National Heritage List for England
- Historic England, "No. 31 High Street, Bridgnorth (1053961)", National Heritage List for England
- Historic England, "No. 32 High Street, Bridgnorth (1053962)", National Heritage List for England
- Historic England, "Nos. 40, 41 and 41A High Street, Bridgnorth (1053965)", National Heritage List for England
- Historic England, "No. 42 High Street, Bridgnorth (1053966)", National Heritage List for England
- Historic England, "Nos. 55 and 56 High Street, Bridgnorth (1053970)", National Heritage List for England
- Historic England, "Nos. 71 and 72 High Street, Bridgnorth (1177652)", National Heritage List for England
- Historic England, "No. 77 High Street, Bridgnorth (1367491)", National Heritage List for England
- Historic England, "No. 32 High Street, Bridgnorth (1053962)", National Heritage List for England
- Historic England, "Nos. 78 and 79 High Street, Bridgnorth (1307316)", National Heritage List for England
- Historic England, "Nos. 30 and 30A High Street, Bridgnorth (1380181)", National Heritage List for England
- Historic England, "No. 4 St John's Street, Bridgnorth (1053950)", National Heritage List for England
- Historic England, "Nos. 28 and 29 St Leonard's Close, Bridgnorth (1178177)", National Heritage List for England
- Historic England, "Nos. 7–10 St Mary's Street, Bridgnorth (1053917)", National Heritage List for England
- Historic England, "Nos. 12–14 and 18–20 St Mary's Street, Bridgnorth (1053919)", National Heritage List for England
- Historic England, "Nos. 23–28 St Mary's Street, Bridgnorth (1053922)", National Heritage List for England
- Historic England, "No. 55 St Mary's Street, Bridgnorth (1053925)", National Heritage List for England
- Historic England, "Nos. 57–61 St Mary's Street, Bridgnorth (1053926)", National Heritage List for England
- Historic England, "No. 3 Waterloo Terrace, Bridgnorth (1374842)", National Heritage List for England
- Historic England, "No. 23 West Castle Street, Bridgnorth (1053932)", National Heritage List for England
- Historic England, "Nos. 9, 9A and 9B Whitburn Street, Bridgnorth (1254172)", National Heritage List for England
- Historic England, "No. 52 Whitburn Street, Bridgnorth (1180217)", National Heritage List for England
- Historic England, "Nos. 66–68 Whitburn Street, Bridgnorth (1053717)", National Heritage List for England
- Historic England, "Foster Arms Public House, Bridgnorth (1053937)", National Heritage List for England
- Historic England, "Harpswood Bridge, Bridgnorth (1053836)", National Heritage List for England
- Historic England, "Hillside House, Bridgnorth (1178219)", National Heritage List for England
- Historic England, "The Court, Bridgnorth (1307364)", National Heritage List for England
- Historic England, "The Falcon Hotel, Bridgnorth (1053949)", National Heritage List for England
- Historic England, "The Rectory, Bridgnorth (1367500)", National Heritage List for England
- Historic England, "Nos. 2 and 2A Bridge Street, Bridgnorth (1367863)", National Heritage List for England
- Historic England, "No. 46 Cartway, Bridgnorth (1053186)", National Heritage List for England
- Historic England, "Nos. 69–71 Cartway, Bridgnorth (1053982)", National Heritage List for England
- Historic England, "No. 3 Castle Terrace, Bridgnorth (1053685)", National Heritage List for England
- Historic England, "No. 26 East Castle Street, Bridgnorth (1307461)", National Heritage List for England
- Historic England, "Nos. 28–31 Friars Street, Bridgnorth (1177414)", National Heritage List for England
- Historic England, "No. 37 High Street, Bridgnorth (1367486)", National Heritage List for England
- Historic England, "No. 65 High Street, Bridgnorth (1367490)", National Heritage List for England
- Historic England, "No. 75 High Street, Bridgnorth (1307351)", National Heritage List for England
- Historic England, "Nos. 51 and 52 Mill Street, Bridgnorth (1053979)", National Heritage List for England
- Historic England, "No. 54 Mill Street, Bridgnorth (1053980)", National Heritage List for England
- Historic England, "No. 55 Mill Street, Bridgnorth (1177770)", National Heritage List for England
- Historic England, "No. 2 St Leonard's Court, Bridgnorth (1367484)", National Heritage List for England
- Historic England, "No. 64 St Mary's Street, Bridgnorth (1374840)", National Heritage List for England
- Historic England, "No. 10 St John's Street, Bridgnorth (1053951)", National Heritage List for England
- Historic England, "Nos. 10A and 11 St John's Street, Bridgnorth (1367482)", National Heritage List for England
- Historic England, "No. 16 St John's Street, Bridgnorth (1053952)", National Heritage List for England
- Historic England, "No. 30 St Mary's Street, Bridgnorth (1053923)", National Heritage List for England
- Historic England, "Nos. 65 and 68 St Mary's Street, Bridgnorth (1178344)", National Heritage List for England
- Historic England, "No. 12 West Castle Street, Bridgnorth (1180194)", National Heritage List for England
- Historic England, "Nos. 64 and 65 Whitburn Street, Bridgnorth (1053934)", National Heritage List for England
- Historic England, "Acacia House, Bridgnorth (1374837)", National Heritage List for England
- Historic England, "Black Horse Hotel, Bridgnorth (1053176)", National Heritage List for England
- Historic England, "Severn Arms Public House, Bridgnorth (1374841)", National Heritage List for England
- Historic England, "Barn to south-east of Nos. 1 and 3 Stourbridge Road, Bridgnorth (1180115)", National Heritage List for England
- Historic England, "Old Grammar School, Bridgnorth (1053954)", National Heritage List for England
- Historic England, "The Almshouses, Bridgnorth (1177291)", National Heritage List for England
- Historic England, "Church of St Mary Magdalene, Bridgnorth (1177357)", National Heritage List for England
- Historic England, "Severn Bridge, Bridgnorth (1053177)", National Heritage List for England
- Historic England, "No. 1 Bridge Street, Bridgnorth (1053175)", National Heritage List for England
- Historic England, "No. 11 Mill Street, Bridgnorth (1053976)", National Heritage List for England
- Historic England, "No. 51 Cartway, Bridgnorth (1053187)", National Heritage List for England
- Historic England, "No. 1 Bank Street, Bridgnorth (1053174)", National Heritage List for England
- Historic England, "No. 8A Bank Street, Bridgnorth (1307617)", National Heritage List for England
- Historic England, "No. 3 Bridge Street, Bridgnorth (1177056)", National Heritage List for England
- Historic England, "No. 5 Bridge Street, Bridgnorth (1177069)", National Heritage List for England
- Historic England, "No. 2 Cartway, Bridgnorth (1053178)", National Heritage List for England
- Historic England, "No. 14 Cartway, Bridgnorth (1053179)", National Heritage List for England
- Historic England, "Nos. 16 and 17 Cartway, Bridgnorth (1053180)", National Heritage List for England
- Historic England, "Nos. 35 and 36 Cartway, Bridgnorth (1053183)", National Heritage List for England
- Historic England, "No. 4 Castle Terrace and Beaumaris House, Bridgnorth (1053986)", National Heritage List for England
- Historic England, "Nos. 6–8 Church Street, Bridgnorth (1053989)", National Heritage List for England
- Historic England, "Nos. 4 and 5 Danesford, Bridgnorth (1295289)", National Heritage List for England
- Historic England, "No. 10 East Castle Street, Bridgnorth (1053991)", National Heritage List for England
- Historic England, "No. 13 East Castle Street, Bridgnorth (1177325)", National Heritage List for England
- Historic England, "No. 15 East Castle Street, Bridgnorth (1177330)", National Heritage List for England
- Historic England, "No. 19 East Castle Street, Bridgnorth (1307489)", National Heritage List for England
- Historic England, "No. 21 East Castle Street, Bridgnorth (1367461)", National Heritage List for England
- Historic England, "No. 22 East Castle Street, Bridgnorth (1177373)", National Heritage List for England
- Historic England, "No. 23 East Castle Street, Bridgnorth (1053995)", National Heritage List for England
- Historic England, "No. 24 East Castle Street, Bridgnorth (1177383)", National Heritage List for England
- Historic England, "No. 25 East Castle Street, Bridgnorth (1367462)", National Heritage List for England
- Historic England, "No. 27 East Castle Street, Bridgnorth (1053996)", National Heritage List for England
- Historic England, "Nos. 28 and 29 East Castle Street, Bridgnorth (1177401)", National Heritage List for England
- Historic England, "Former Trustee Savings Bank, Bridgnorth (1367463)", National Heritage List for England
- Historic England, "No. 24 High Street, Bridgnorth (1054000)", National Heritage List for England
- Historic England, "Nos. 44 and 45 High Street, Bridgnorth (1177565)", National Heritage List for England
- Historic England, "No. 82 High Street, Bridgnorth (1053972)", National Heritage List for England
- Historic England, "Nos. 9 and 10 Listley Street, Bridgnorth (1053974)", National Heritage List for England
- Historic England, "Nos. 7–10 Mill Street, Bridgnorth (1177730)", National Heritage List for England
- Historic England, "Nos. 46 and 47 Mill Street, Bridgnorth (1053978)", National Heritage List for England
- Historic England, "Nos. 18 and 19 Pound Street, Bridgnorth (1177851)", National Heritage List for England
- Historic England, "Nos. 40–42 River Side, Bridgnorth (1177921)", National Heritage List for England
- Historic England, "No. 5 St John's Street, Bridgnorth (1177948)", National Heritage List for England
- Historic England, "Chadwick Temperance Hotel, Bridgnorth (1053918)", National Heritage List for England
- Historic England, "No. 21 St Mary's Street, Bridgnorth (1053920)", National Heritage List for England
- Historic England, "No. 22 St Mary's Street, Bridgnorth (1053921)", National Heritage List for England
- Historic England, "Nos. 43 and 44 St Mary's Street, Bridgnorth (1053924)", National Heritage List for England
- Historic England, "Nos. 62 and 63 St Mary's Street, Bridgnorth (1295094)", National Heritage List for England
- Historic England, "No. 69 St Mary's Street, Bridgnorth (1178372)", National Heritage List for England
- Historic England, "No. 2 Waterloo Terrace, Bridgnorth (1180152)", National Heritage List for England
- Historic England, "Nos. 24–30 Whitburn Street, Bridgnorth (1261417)", National Heritage List for England
- Historic England, "Nos. 7–9 and 12 Underhill Street, Bridgnorth (1180124)", National Heritage List for England
- Historic England, "Bear Inn, Bridgnorth (1053942)", National Heritage List for England
- Historic England, "Bandon Arms Hotel, Bridgnorth (1177739)", National Heritage List for England
- Historic England, "Bell and Talbot Inn, Bridgnorth (1180085)", National Heritage List for England
- Historic England, "Fox Inn, Bridgnorth (1295287)", National Heritage List for England
- Historic England, "Golden Lion Public House, Bridgnorth (1053973)", National Heritage List for England
- Historic England, "Grange Cottage, Bridgnorth (1053948)", National Heritage List for England
- Historic England, "Greenacres, Bridgnorth (1177884)", National Heritage List for England
- Historic England, "The Hen and Chickens Inn, Bridgnorth (1053957)", National Heritage List for England
- Historic England, "Midland Bank, Bridgnorth (1053967)", National Heritage List for England
- Historic England, "Municipal Offices, Bridgnorth (1178142)", National Heritage List for England
- Historic England, "New Inn, Bridgnorth (1053958)", National Heritage List for England
- Historic England, "Premises occupied by Messrs Tanner, Wine Merchants, Bridgnorth (1053927)", National Heritage List for England
- Historic England, "Shakespeare Hotel, Bridgnorth (1180203)", National Heritage List for England
- Historic England, "The Watch-Tower, The Chantry, Bridgnorth (1053947)", National Heritage List for England
- Historic England, "The Vine Public House, Bridgnorth (1053938)", National Heritage List for England
- Historic England, "Warehouse occupied by Messrs S E & A Ridley, Bridgnorth (1177096)", National Heritage List for England
- Historic England, "White Lion Inn, Bridgnorth (1180184)", National Heritage List for England
- Historic England, "Quatford Castle, Bridgnorth (1374849)", National Heritage List for England
- Historic England, "No. 25 High Street, Bridgnorth (1054001)", National Heritage List for England
- Historic England, "Nos. 20 and 21 Railway Street, Bridgnorth (1374850)", National Heritage List for England
- Historic England, "Bridgnorth Station (1053173)", National Heritage List for England
- Historic England, "Ebenezer Row, Bridgnorth (1307293)", National Heritage List for England
- Historic England, "Baptist Chapel, Bridgnorth (1374843)", National Heritage List for England
- Historic England, "Fort Pendlestone including sluice and leat bridge to north, Bridgnorth (1268454)", National Heritage List for England
- Historic England, "No. 34 Cartway, Bridgnorth (1177162)", National Heritage List for England
- Historic England, "No. 11 East Castle Street, Bridgnorth (1307508)", National Heritage List for England
- Historic England, "No. 12 East Castle Street, Bridgnorth (1367499)", National Heritage List for England
- Historic England, "No. 14 East Castle Street, Bridgnorth (1053992)", National Heritage List for England
- Historic England, "Nos. 84 and 85 High Street, Bridgnorth (1307323)", National Heritage List for England
- Historic England, "Nos. 38–40 St Mary's Street, Bridgnorth (1374838)", National Heritage List for England
- Historic England, "United Methodist and Congregational Church, Bridgnorth (1177111)", National Heritage List for England
- Historic England, "The New Market Hall, Bridgnorth (1053712)", National Heritage List for England
- Historic England, "Church of St Nicholas, Bridgnorth (1431512)", National Heritage List for England
- Historic England, "No. 1 East Castle Street, Bridgnorth (1367498)", National Heritage List for England
- Historic England, "Sabrina Fountain, Bridgnorth (1246858)", National Heritage List for England
- Historic England, "Palmer's Hospital, Bridgnorth (1295194)", National Heritage List for England
- Historic England, "Cliff Railway Station and Stoneway Guest House, Bridgnorth (1254355)", National Heritage List for England
- Historic England, "Upper station of Cliff Railway, Bridgnorth (1254381)", National Heritage List for England
- Historic England, "Conduit Head adjacent to the former Trustee Savings Bank, Bridgnorth (1392278)", National Heritage List for England
- Historic England, "Conduit Head, corner of Westgate and Ludlow Road, Bridgnorth (1392279)", National Heritage List for England
- Historic England, "National Provincial Bank, Bridgnorth (1367465)", National Heritage List for England
- Historic England, "North Gate, Bridgnorth (1374846)", National Heritage List for England
- Historic England, "War Memorial, Bridgnorth (1246857)", National Heritage List for England
- Historic England, "K6 telephone kiosk, Bridge Street, Bridgnorth (1367607)", National Heritage List for England
- Historic England, "Oldbury Wells School (East), Bridgnorth (1367610)", National Heritage List for England
- Historic England, "Oldbury Wells School (West), Bridgnorth (1254447)", National Heritage List for England
- Historic England, "No. 54 High Street, Bridgnorth (1367489)", National Heritage List for England
- Historic England, Listed Buildings
- Newman, John; Pevsner, Nikolaus (2006), Shropshire, The Buildings of England, New Haven and London: Yale University Press, ISBN 0-300-12083-4
