= Danesford =

Coordinates: 52.522°N 2.402°W

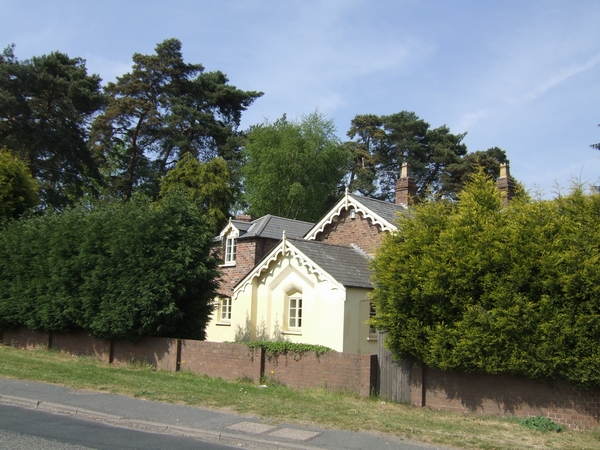
- The lodge to Quatford Castle, just east of Danesford

- Location within Shropshire
- OS grid reference: SO727916
- Civil parish: Bridgnorth
- Unitary authority: Shropshire
- Ceremonial county: Shropshire
- Region: West Midlands
- Country: England
- Sovereign state: United Kingdom
- Post town: BRIDGNORTH
- Postcode district: WV15
- Dialling code: 01746
- Police: West Mercia
- Fire: Shropshire
- Ambulance: West Midlands
- UK Parliament: Ludlow

Danesford is a small settlement in Shropshire, England. It is on the A442 road and is to the southeast of the town of Bridgnorth. The population as of the 2011 census is listed under the town of Bridgnorth.

== See also ==
- Listed buildings in Bridgnorth
