= Oldbury, Shropshire =

Village in Shropshire, England

Coordinates: 52.525°N 2.425°W

Oldbury
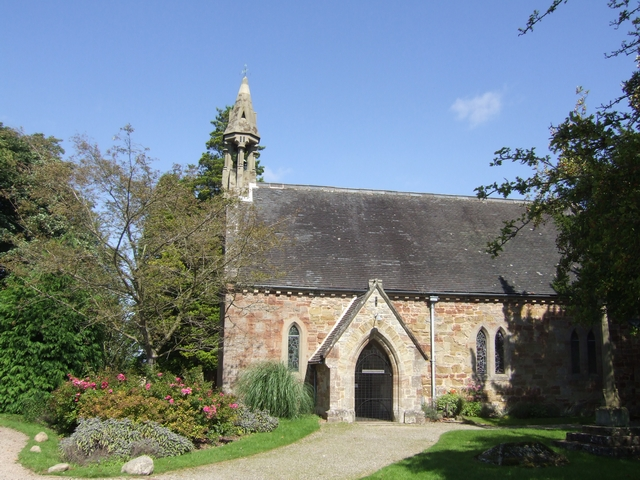
- St Nicholas's church in the village

- Location within Shropshire
- OS grid reference: SO711920
- Civil parish: Bridgnorth
- Unitary authority: Shropshire
- Ceremonial county: Shropshire
- Region: West Midlands
- Country: England
- Sovereign state: United Kingdom
- Post town: BRIDGNORTH
- Postcode district: WV16
- Dialling code: 01746
- Police: West Mercia
- Fire: Shropshire
- Ambulance: West Midlands
- UK Parliament: Ludlow

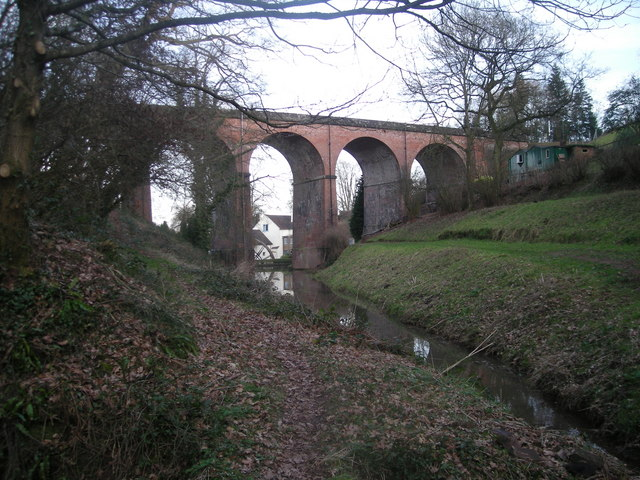
Daniel's Bridge, which transports the Severn Valley Railway, situated to the east of Oldbury

Oldbury is a small village and former civil parish, now in the parish of Bridgnorth, in the Shropshire district, in the ceremonial county of Shropshire, England.

== Geography ==
It is situated approximately 1/2 mile (0.80 km) south of the market town of Bridgnorth. In 1951 the parish had a population of 283. On 1 April 1967 the civil parish of Oldbury (covering 817 acres) was abolished and merged with Bridgnorth. The village remains separated from the town however and has a distinct character.

The village is linked to the town by the modern B4363 road, though the original route linking the two settlements is now cut in half by the Bridgnorth by-pass (the A458 road). However, as there is a footbridge crossing the A458 it is still possible for pedestrians and cyclists to follow the old route, which goes up Manor Farm Lane, splits to the right down the hill towards the by-pass, and continues on the Bridgnorth side down Oldbury Wells towards Hollybush Road.

The Mercian Way (National Cycle Route 45) follows part of this route, from Manor Farm Lane, over the bypass and then through Oldbury Wells.

The village lies on a notable hillside, which slopes down from Henley Lodge (at 102m above sea level) towards the River Severn, which flows to the east of the village, with the lower parts of the settlement at approximately 60m. The village is quite spread out, with a number of small country lanes and paddocks within the general boundaries. Between Oldbury and the River Severn is the Severn Valley Railway.

Oldbury Wells lies within the Bridgnorth by-pass and is now effectively part of the town (grid reference SO710925). It has one of the town's two secondary schools, Oldbury Wells School.

== History ==
Oldbury also contains an old church, dedicated to Saint Nicholas, which features beautiful stained-glass windows depicting Biblical scenes, with a west window, dedicated in 1919 as a parish First World War memorial depicting St Alban and St Martin of Tours and accompanied by a wooden board listing 13 men who died serving in that war. From the church there is an old raised pathway across fields towards Bridgnorth, now rarely walked upon though still visible, known traditionally as the "Coffin Way". Coffins were brought from Bridgnorth by mourners, as at one time they could be buried at St Nicholas's for free whereas there was a fee in Bridgnorth churchyards.

== Electronics ==
Oldbury Grange had the research site of Decca Radio and Television from 1977. The site was a former rehabilitation centre of the RNIB until October 1971. Decca had a colour television manufacturing plant in Bridgnorth from 1968, taking over a former Plessey factory.

== Notable residents ==
- Aircraft designer John Dudley North settled at Oldbury where he died in 1968.

== See also ==
- Listed buildings in Bridgnorth
