= Quatford =

Village in Shropshire, England

Coordinates: 52.513°N 2.386°W

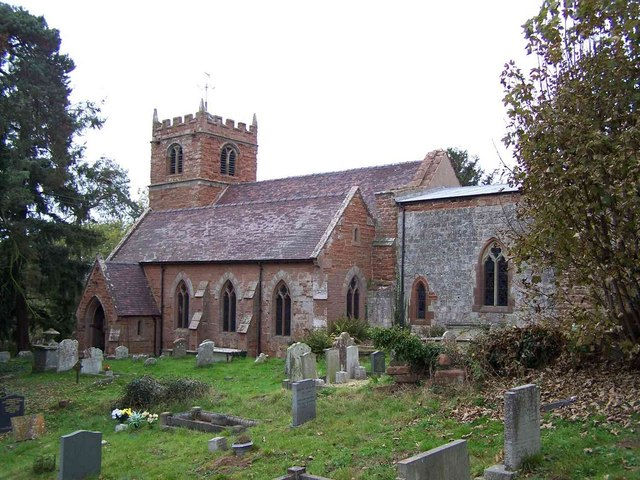
- St. Mary Magdalene Church, Quatford

- Location within Shropshire
- OS grid reference: SO738906
- Civil parish: Bridgnorth
- Unitary authority: Shropshire
- Ceremonial county: Shropshire
- Region: West Midlands
- Country: England
- Sovereign state: United Kingdom
- Post town: BRIDGNORTH
- Postcode district: WV15
- Dialling code: 01746
- Police: West Mercia
- Fire: Shropshire
- Ambulance: West Midlands
- UK Parliament: Ludlow

Quatford is a village in the civil parish of Bridgnorth, in the Severn Valley, Shropshire, England. It is located on the A442, just south of the town of Bridgnorth and on the bank of the River Severn. The majority of residents in the village live on one of the Caravan Parks.

== History ==
Quatford is one of the oldest settlements in the area. It was listed in the Domesday Book, the draft of which was finished in 1086. Quatford was settled because of the ease of fording the River Severn. Its name came from it being a ford near Quatt. As the River Severn became deeper a bridge was built at the site instead. In the 11th century a small castle was built on high ground overlooking the river, but was demolished a few years later. Traces of the motte still remain.

Quatford's importance as a crossing of the River Severn was diminished when another bridge was built 2 miles upstream. A settlement was formed at the "bridge north of Quatford", now known as Bridgnorth, which became the major town in the district.

North of the village is a mock castle now known as Quatford Castle. It was built circa 1830 by John Smalman for himself and originally called Morf Mount; later, it became the residence of Smalman's grand-nephew, Henry Edward James Bevan, and in turn the latter's son Hugh.

In 1951 the civil parish had a population of 185. On 1 April 1967 the parish was abolished to form Bridgnorth.

The village appears in the 2020 video game Assassin's Creed Valhalla as the capital of Shropshire, there known as Sciropescire.

== Amenities ==
- The Danery Pub
- The Foodstop Cafeteria
- St Mary Magdalene Church
- Quatford Cattery
- Quatford Petrol Station

== See also ==
- Listed buildings in Bridgnorth
