= Sheringham Park =

Landscaped park and gardens near Sheringham, Norfolk, England

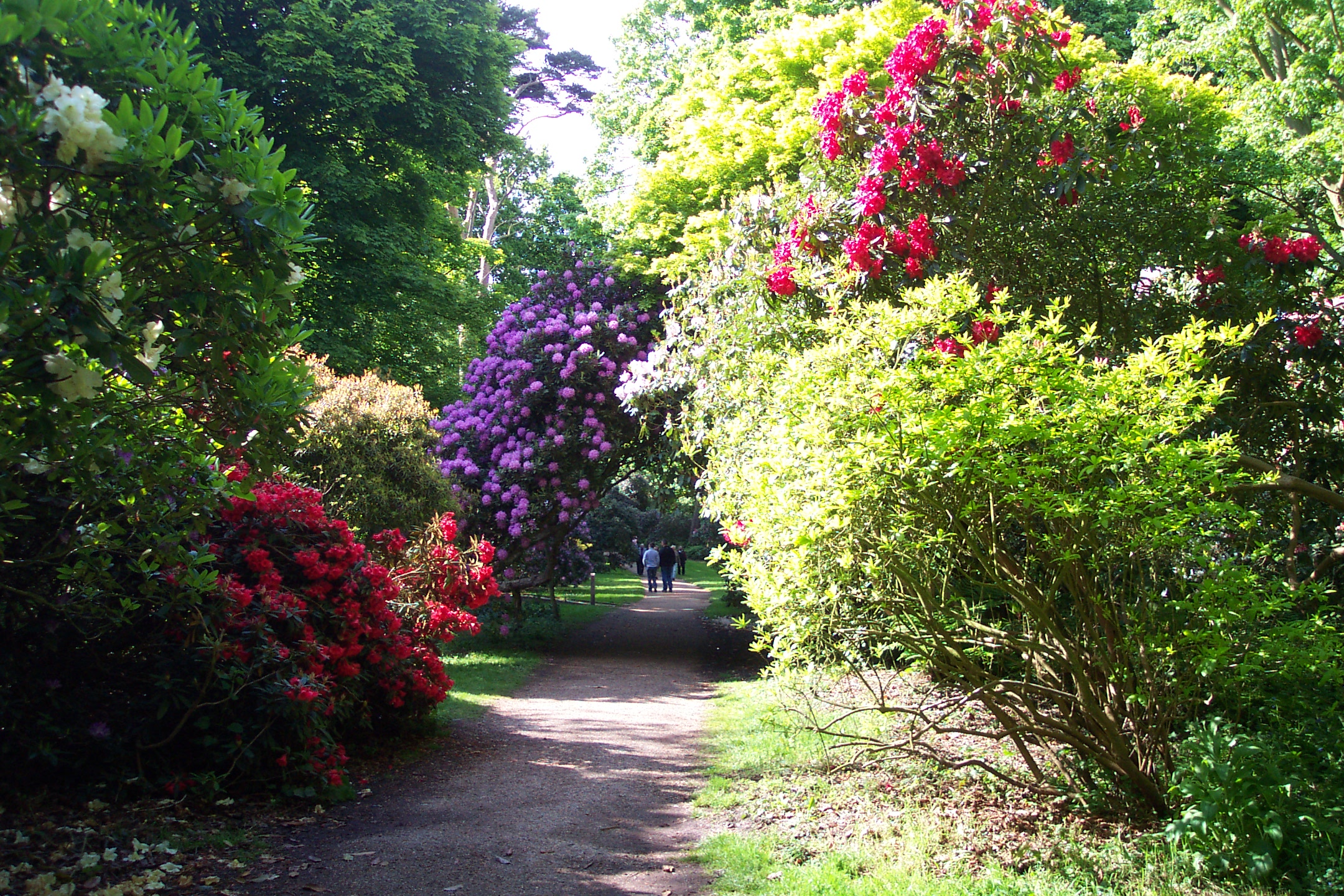
- Sheringham Park. The rhododendron gardens

- Location within Norfolk
- Location: Sheringham, North Norfolk, East of England, Norfolk
- Coordinates: 52°55′48″N 01°10′30″E
- Established: July 1812
- Owner: In the care of the National Trust
- Website: www.nationaltrust.org.uk/sheringham-park/

Sheringham Park is a landscape park and gardens near the town of Sheringham, Norfolk, England. The park surrounds Sheringham Hall (which is not open to the public), lying mostly to its south. The plantations of Sheringham Park are in the care of the National Trust and open to visitors.

The park was designed by Humphry Repton (1752–1818) who presented his proposals in July 1812 in the form of one of his Red Books. He described Sheringham as his "favourite and darling child in Norfolk". Abbot and Charlotte Upcher bought the estate in 1811, and successive generations of the Upcher family did much to develop the estate, the hall and the park, as well as building a school.

There are fine mature woodlands and a large variety of rhododendrons and azaleas. In the early 20th century, Henry Morris Upcher obtained rhododendron seeds of various types from plantsman Ernest "Chinese" Wilson. Plants from this source which can found at the garden include Rhododendron ambiguum, calophytum and decorum, among others. Many other species of tree and shrub are represented in the garden, including fifteen kinds of magnolia, large specimen pieris. Among the other trees are maples, acers, styrax, eucryphia, pocket handkerchief tree davidia involucrata and a fine example of the snowdrop tree. Several overlook towers provide good views over the plantations, and of the nearby coast and surrounding countryside. A garden temple was constructed in the park in 1975 to the designs of James Fletcher-Watson.

== Location ==
Sheringham Park is located 2 miles south west of the coastal town of Sheringham, 5 miles west of Cromer and 6 miles east of Holt. The main entrance is at the junction of the A148 Cromer to Holt road and the B1157 road to Upper Sheringham. The Norfolk Coast Path passes through the property. A car park, cafe and visitor centre are near the main entrance. Waymarked paths through the estate link the gardens and visitors centre to the coast, and to the Weybourne station on the North Norfolk Railway, a preserved steam railway. Pedestrian access to the park is from the village of Upper Sheringham, which is adjacent to the park.

== Visitor centre ==
The visitor centre is located within Wood Farm Barn at the southern end of the park, the barn also houses an exhibition of the history and the wildlife of Sheringham Park. Together with a reception desk and information kiosk. From the reception there are hearing loops available. Wheelchairs and powered mobility vehicles available at no charge although it is necessary to take a small test before use. The refreshment kiosk is also at Wood Farm Barn.

The exhibition area explores the life and work of the landscape architect Humphry Repton and also of the Upcher family who owned the park. There are several examples of Humphry Repton's red book of plans for the designs of the park. Part of the exhibition area has an area dedicated to the wildlife and nature of the park with identification games and interactive displays.

=== Volunteers ===
The park has a group of regular volunteers who help the garden staff with their duties. Under the guidance of the head gardener they undertake tasks such as pruning trees and other tasks, and generally keeping the park in a condition fit for visitors.

=== Gallery ===
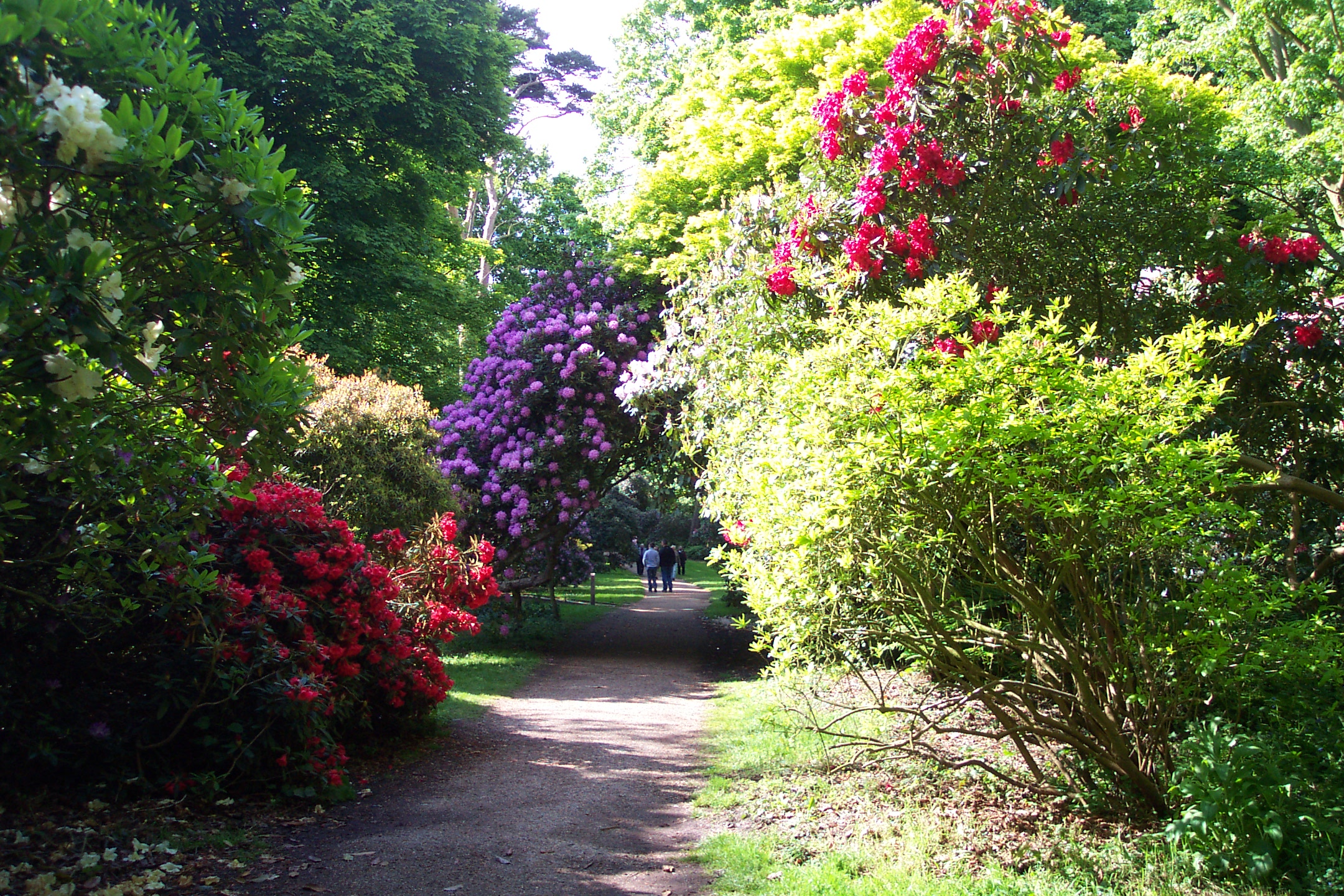
The Rhododendron gardens.

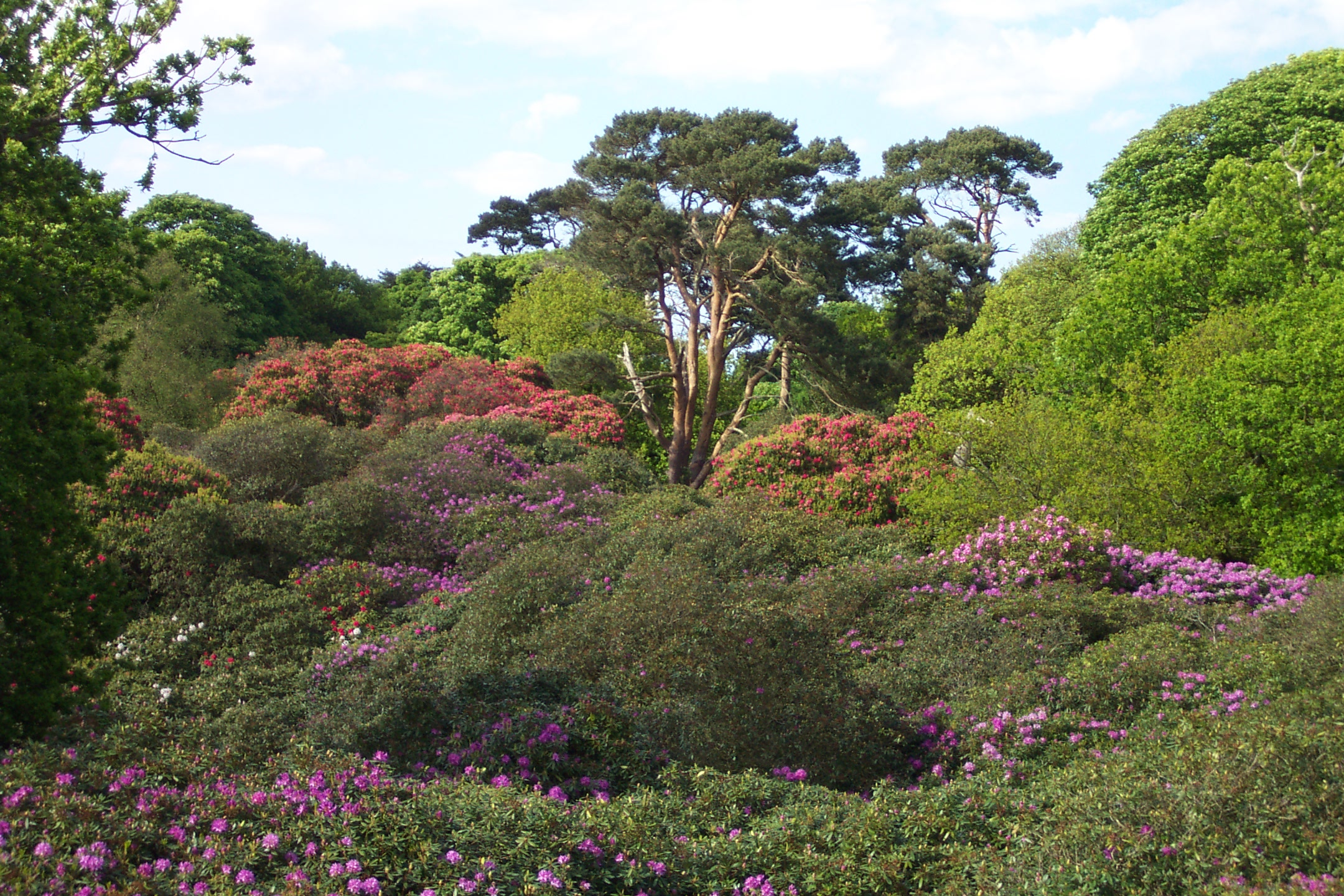
View from one of the overlook towers.

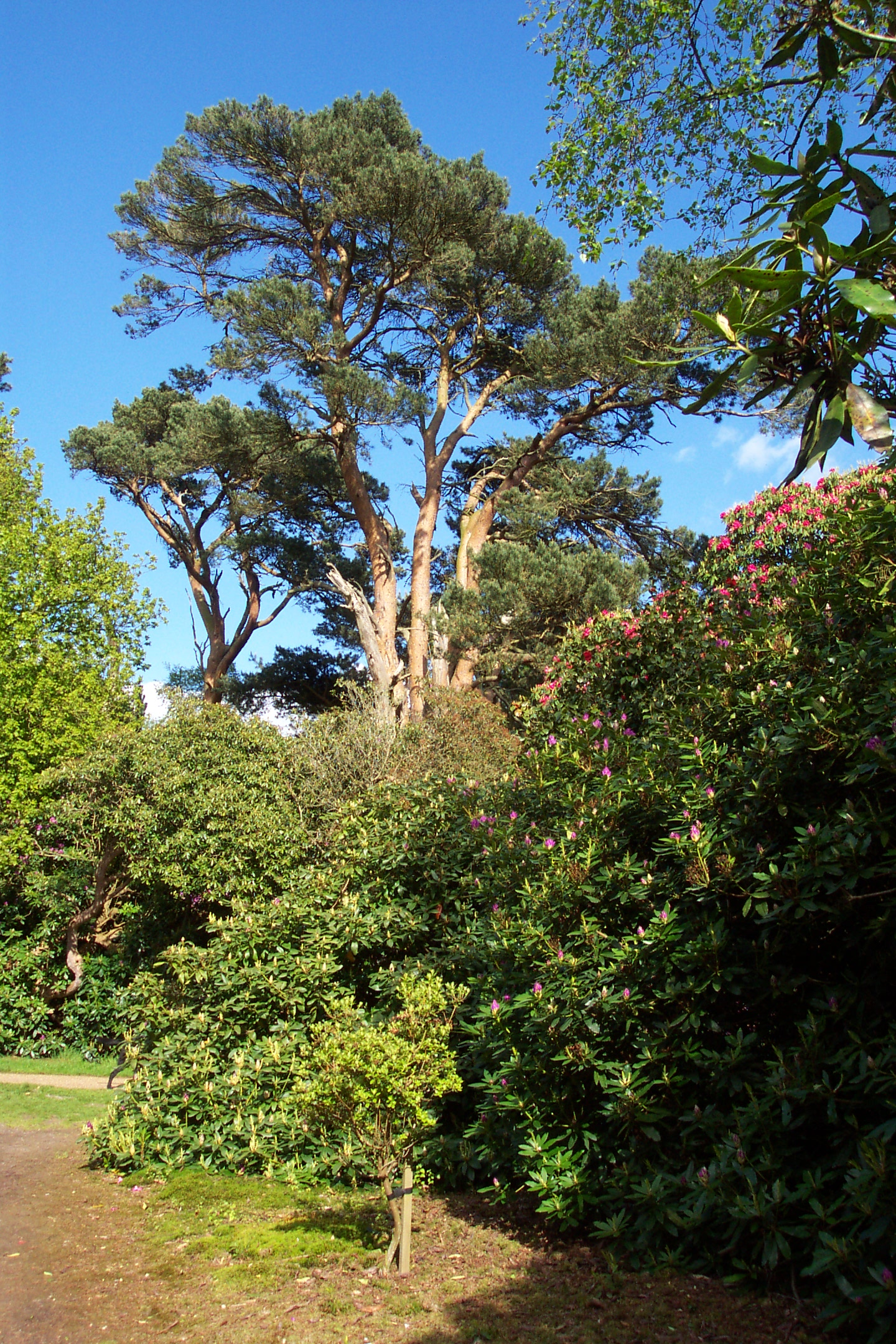
Treescape in the gardens

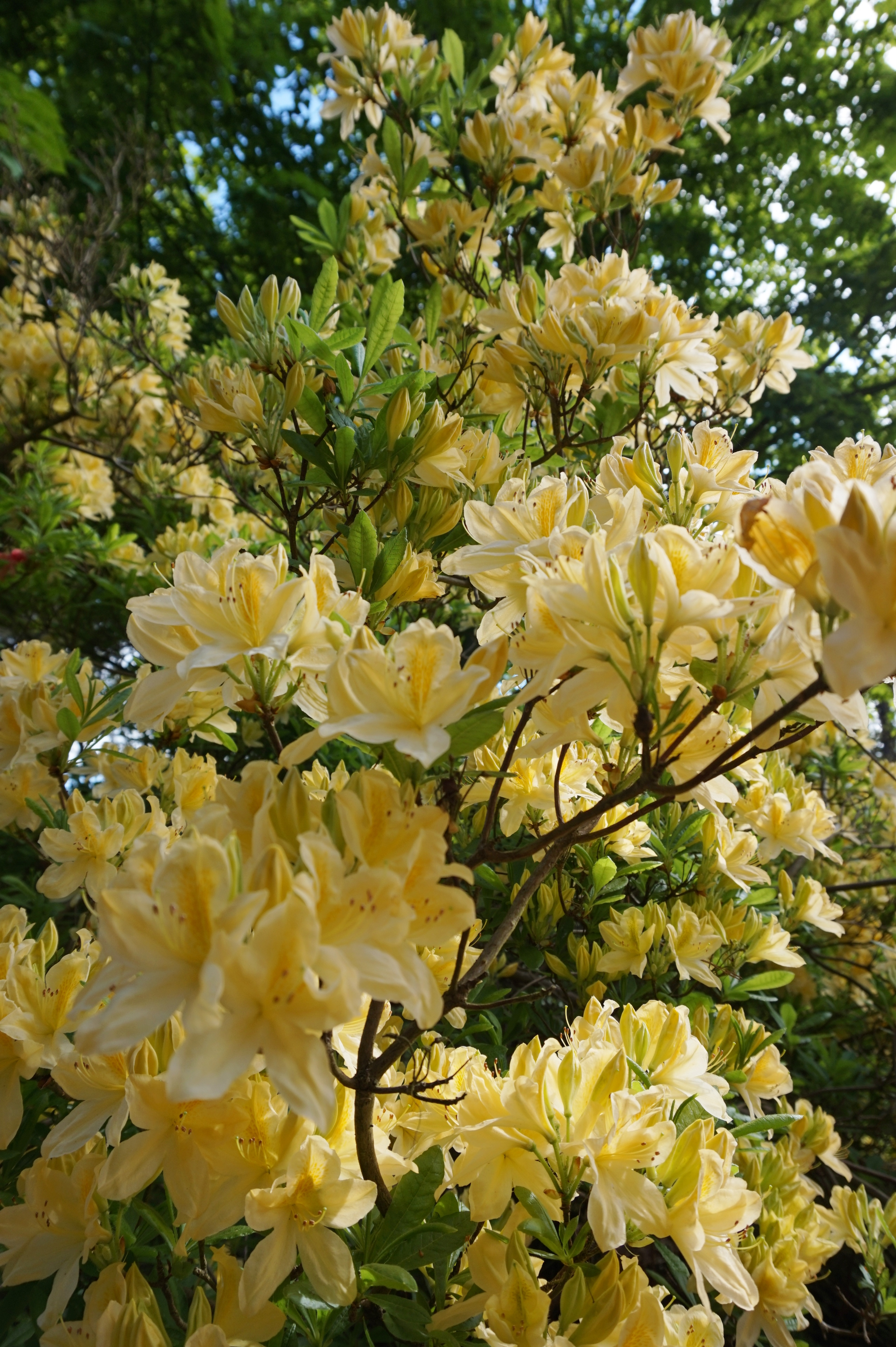
Rhododendron in full bloom. May 2018

== Sheringham Hall ==
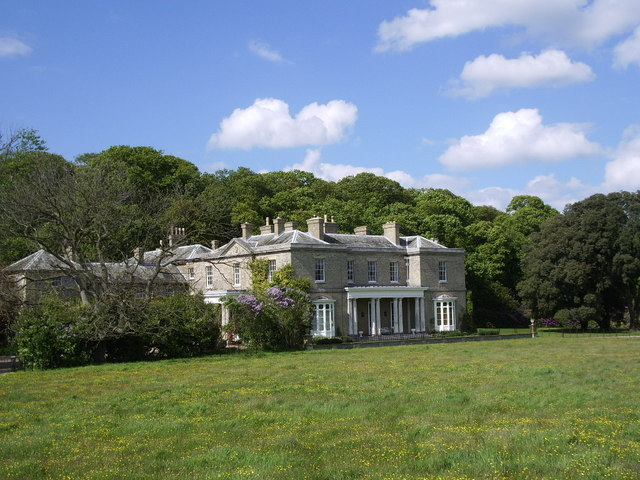
Sheringham Hall

The Regency, Grade II listed building is finished in grey, gault, Lincolnshire brick was designed and built by Humphry Repton and his architect son, John Adey Repton. Due to the Norfolk coast's glacial winds, Repton chose a south facing site in the lee of a wooded hillside. In July 1813 the Upcher family laid the foundation stone and the family hoped to move into the house in the summer of 1817, but the owner of the estate Abbot Upcher fell ill and died in 1819 at the age of 35. The hall remained empty for 20 years until Henry Ramey Upcher completed the house in 1839.

The hall's lease was offered for sale in 2008 and the lease was further extended at that time.
