= Henry Wilson, 10th Baron Berners =

The Right Honourable The Lord Berners
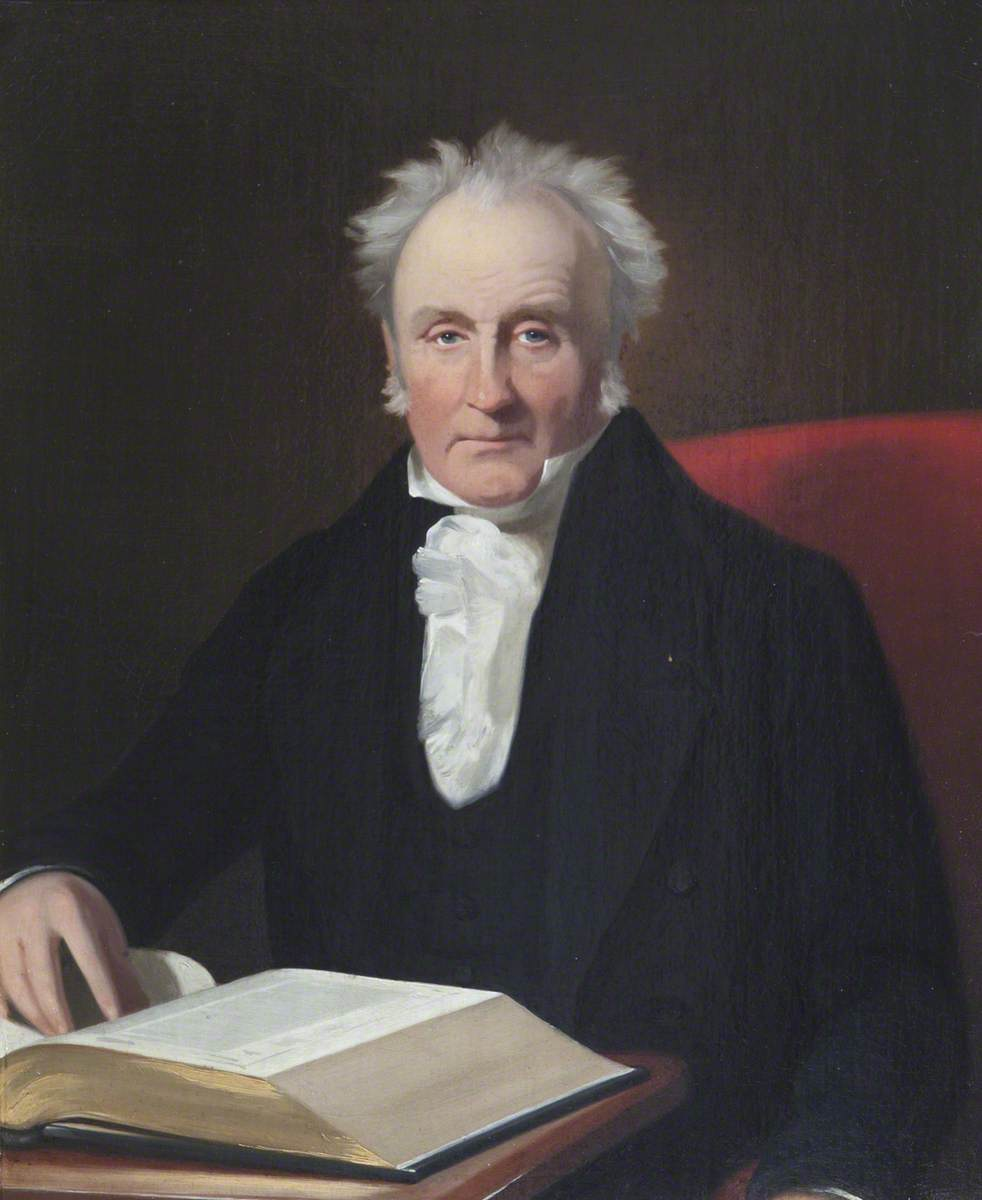
- Portrait of Lord Berners, by Robert Scott Tait, 1841
- Born: Henry Wilson; 1 October 1762
- Died: 26 February 1851 (aged 88); Kirby Cane, Norfolk
- Education: Emmanuel College, Cambridge
- Spouse: Elizabeth Sumpter (m. 1788; died 1845)
- Parent(s): Henry William Wilson; Mary Miller
- Relatives: Harriet Tyrwhitt, 12th Baroness Berners (granddaughter)

Henry Wilson, 10th Baron Berners (1 October 1762 – 26 February 1851) was an English reverend and peer.

== Early life ==
Wilson was born on 1 October 1762. He was the son of Mary (née Miller) Wilson and Henry William Wilson (1728–1796) of Didlington Hall and Ashwellthorpe Hall. Among his siblings were elder brother, Robert Wilson, 9th Baron Berners, and sister, Mary Wilson (the wife of Col. George Crump, of Allexton Hall). His younger brother, Rev. George Wilson, was the father of Sir Archdale Wilson, 1st Baronet.

His paternal grandparents were Henry Wilson and Elizabeth (née Knyvett) Wilson. His maternal grandparents were Sir John Miller, 4th Baronet, and the former Susan Combe (a daughter of Dr. Matthew Combe of Winchester).

He was educated at Emmanuel College, Cambridge, graduating with a B.A. in 1785 and a M.A. in 1789.

== Career ==
From 1789 to 1845, he served as Rector of Allexton, Leicestershire, as well as Rector at Kirby Cane, Norfolk, between 1820 and 1851.

Upon the death of his elder brother on 25 March 1838, he succeeded as the 10th Baron Berners. (Note: Both the 9th and 10th Barons Berner were grandchildren of Elizabeth Knyvett (wife of Henry Wilson), a great-granddaughter of Thomas Knyvett (younger brother of John Knyvett, 6th Baron Berners). Following the 1743 death of Katherine Bokenham, 8th Baroness Berners (sister to Thomas Knyvett, 7th Baron Berners, both children of the 6th Baron Berners), the barony had fallen into abeyance between Elizabeth and her sister, Lucy Knyvett (wife of Thomas Holt and John Field) for 89 years until the abeyance was terminated in 1832 in favour of Henry's brother, Robert Wilson, who became the 9th Baron.) His portrait was painted in 1841 by Robert Scott Tait. Today, it is owned by the National Trust and held at Sheringham Park.

== Personal life ==
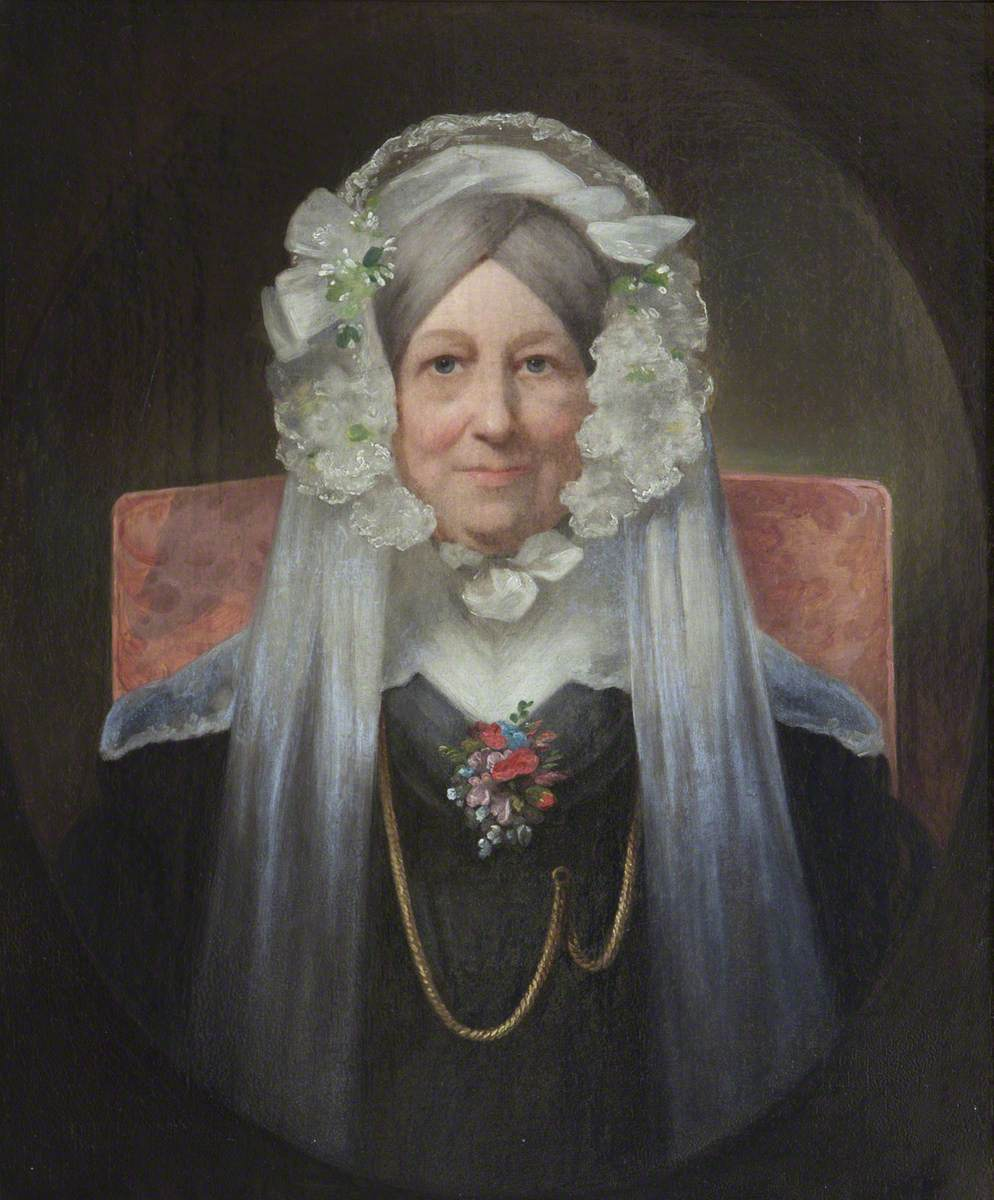
Portrait of his wife, Elizabeth Sumpter, by Robert Scott Tait, 1841

On 1 May 1788 Wilson married Elizabeth Sumpter (c. 1763–1845), daughter of Thomas Sumpter of Histon Hall, Cambridgeshire. Together, they were the parents of:

- Hon. Charlotte Wilson (1790–1857), who married Abbot Upcher in 1809; they built Sheringham Hall.
- Hon. Elizabeth Wilson (1792–1865), who married Rev. William Chester, son of Charles Chester (son of Sir Walter Bagot, 5th Baronet) and Catherine Legge (granddaughter of the 1st Earl of Dartmouth), in 1810.
- Anne Wilson (b. 1793), who died in infancy.
- Hon. Mary Wilson (1795–1874), who died unmarried.
- Henry William Wilson, 11th Baron Berners (1797–1871), who married his cousin Mary Letitia Crump, daughter of Col. George Crump, in 1823. After her death, he married Hon. Henrietta Charlotte Cholmondeley, daughter of Thomas Cholmondeley, 1st Baron Delamere, in 1857.
- Hon. Anne Wilson (1799–1875), who married Rev. John Munnings Johnson in 1833.
- Hon. Robert Wilson (1801–1850), a Reverend who served as Rector of Ashwellthorpe; he married Emma Anne Pigott, daughter of William Pigott, in 1826. After her death, he married his cousin Harriet (née Crump) Sheppard, daughter of Col. George Crump, in 1832.

Lady Berners died on 15 December 1845 at Kirby Cane, Norfolk. Lord Berners died on 26 February 1851, also at Kirby Cane and was succeeded by his eldest son, Henry.

Peerage of England
Preceded by Robert Wilson	Baron Berners; 1838–1851	Succeeded by Henry William Wilson
