= Henry Wilson, 11th Baron Berners =

English peer and agriculturalist (1797–1871)

The Right Honourable The Lord Berners DL JP
- Born: Henry William Wilson; 23 February 1797
- Died: 27 June 1871 (aged 74)
- Education: Eton College; Emmanuel College, Cambridge
- Spouses: Mary Letitia Crump (m. 1823; died 1856); Hon. Henrietta Charlotte Cholmondeley (m. 1857)
- Parent(s): Henry Wilson, 10th Baron Berners; Elizabeth Sumpter
- Relatives: Harriet Tyrwhitt, 12th Baroness Berners (niece)

Henry William Wilson, 11th Baron Berners, DL, JP (23 February 1797 – 27 June 1871) was an English peer and agriculturalist.

== Early life ==
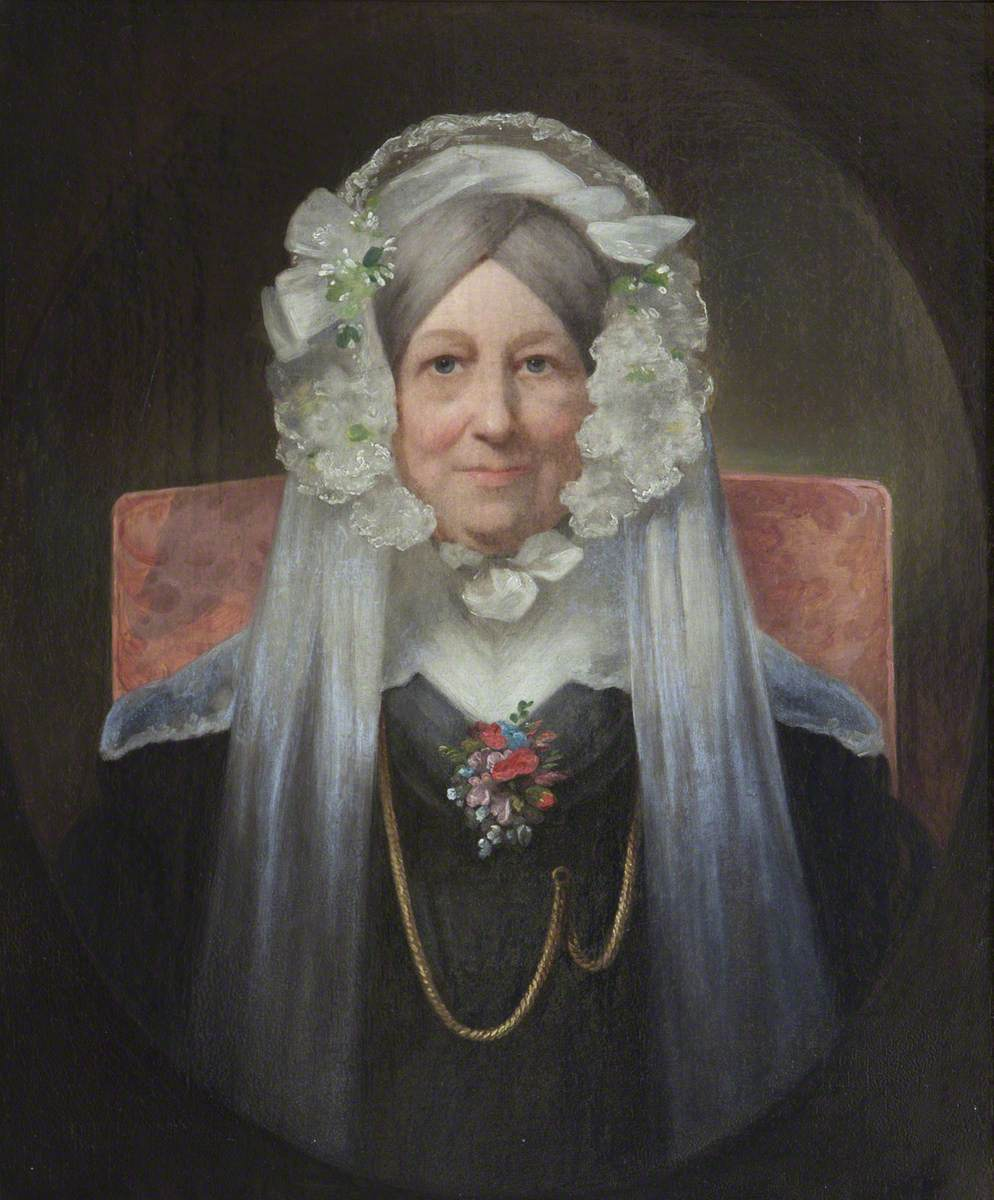
Portrait of his mother, Elizabeth Sumpter, Lady Berners, by Robert Scott Tait, 1841

Wilson was born on 23 February 1797. He was the eldest son of Henry Wilson, 10th Baron Berners and the former Elizabeth Sumpter. Among his siblings were Hon. Charlotte Wilson (wife of Abbot Upcher; they built Sheringham Hall), and Hon. Elizabeth Wilson (wife of the Rev. William Chester, a grandson of Sir Walter Bagot, 5th Baronet and great-grandson of the 1st Earl of Dartmouth).

His paternal grandparents were Mary (née Miller) Wilson and Henry William Wilson of Didlington Hall and Ashwellthorpe Hall. His maternal grandfather was Thomas Sumpter of Histon Hall, Cambridgeshire.

He was educated at Eton before attending Emmanuel College, Cambridge.

== Career ==
He served as Justice of the Peace for Rutland, Leicestershire, and Norfolk and was Deputy Lieutenant of Leicestershire. He served as President of the Royal Agricultural Society in 1858 and served as Constable of Leicester Castle.

On 26 February 1851, he succeeded his father as the 11th Baron Berners. Lord Berners lived at Keythorpe Hall in Leicestershire and at Ashwellthorpe Hall in Norfolk.

== Personal life ==
On 24 February 1823, he married his first cousin, Mary Letitia Crump (1800–1856), a daughter of Col. George Crump and Mary (née Wilson) Crump. Her sister Harriet married Henry's younger brother, the Rev. Robert Wilson, the Rector of Ashwellthorpe.

After her death on 30 September 1856, he married Hon. Henrietta Charlotte Cholmondeley (1823–1874), a daughter of Thomas Cholmondeley, 1st Baron Delamere, and the former Henrietta Elizabeth Williams-Wynn (a daughter of Sir Watkin Williams-Wynn, 4th Baronet), on 21 July 1857 at Vale Royal, Cheshire.

Lord Berners died on 27 June 1871 at age 74, without issue, and was succeeded by his niece, Harriett Tyrwhitt. His widow, Lady Berners, died on 13 August 1874.

Peerage of England
Preceded by Henry Wilson	Baron Berners; 1851–1871	Succeeded by Emma Harriett Tyrwhitt
