= Leonard Francis =

Leonard Francis may refer to:

- Leonard Glenn Francis, a.k.a. Fat Leonard
- Leonard Francis Lindoy, an Australian chemist
- Leonard Francis Tyrwhitt, a Canon of Windsor, 1910-1921
