= Harriet Tyrwhitt, 12th Baroness Berners =

English baroness (1835–1917)

The Right Honourable The Lady Berners
- Born: Emma Harriet Wilson; 18 November 1835
- Died: 18 August 1917 (aged 81); Ashwellthorpe, Norwich
- Spouse: Sir Henry Tyrwhitt, 3rd Baronet (m. 1853; died 1894)
- Children: 12
- Parent(s): Hon. Robert Wilson; Harriet Crump Sheppard
- Relatives: Edward Knollys, 2nd Viscount Knollys (grandson); Gerald Tyrwhitt-Wilson, 14th Baron Berners (grandson); Vashon James Wheeler (grandson)

Emma Harriet Tyrwhitt, 12th Baroness Berners (18 November 1835 – 18 August 1917) was a suo jure Baroness in the Peerage of England.

== Early life ==
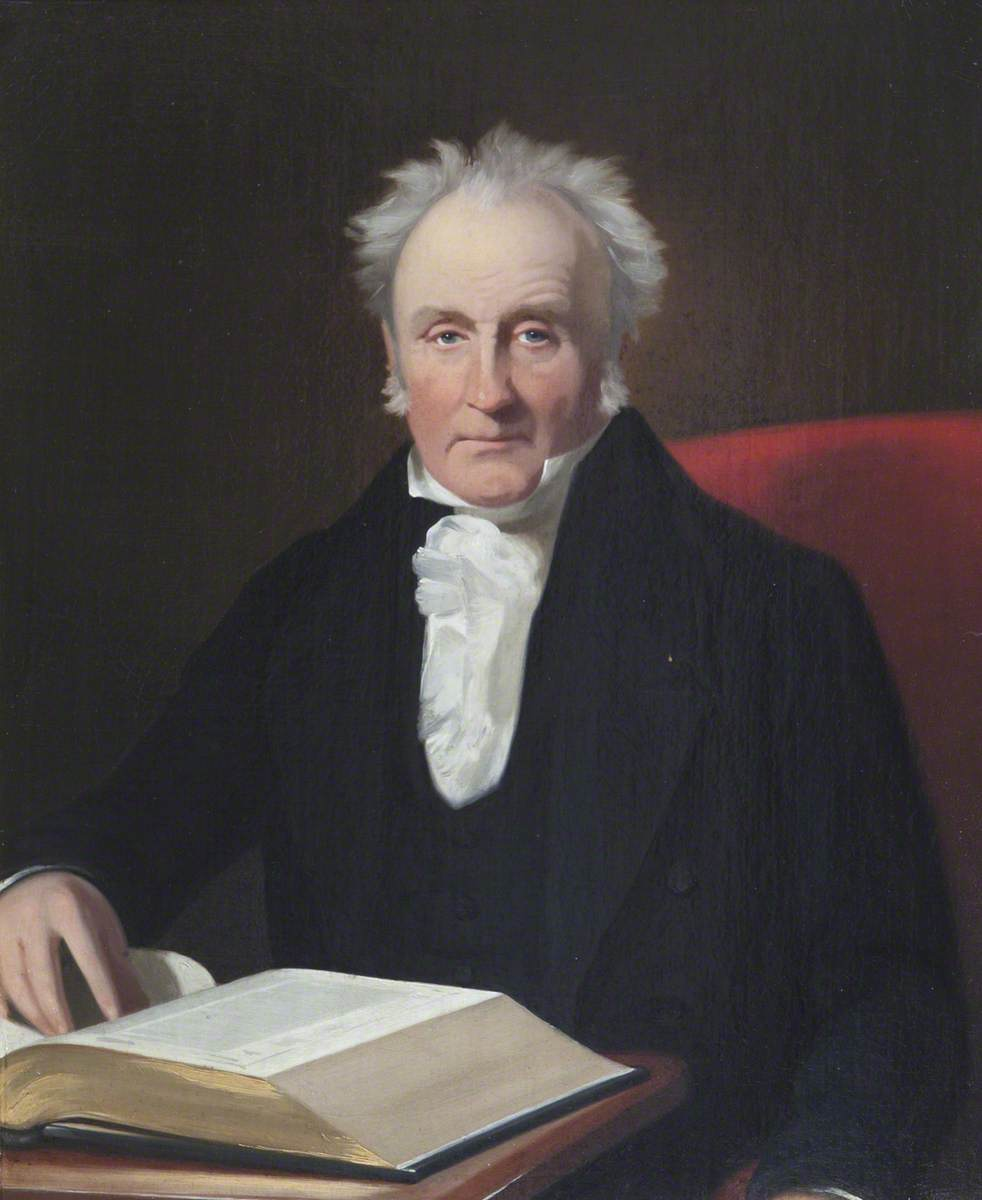
Portrait of her grandfather, the 10th Baron Berners, by Robert Scott Tait, 1841

Harriet was born on 18 November 1835. She was the daughter of the Rev. Hon. Robert Wilson (1801–1850) and his second wife (and cousin), Harriet (née Crump) Sheppard. Her father served as Rector of Ashwellthorpe. His father's first wife was Emma Pigott, a daughter of Col. Piggott of Doddershall Park, and her mother's first husband was John Sheppard. She had an elder brother, Harry William Piggott Wilson, who died in 1853. After her father's death in 1850, her mother married Very Rev. Edward Hoare, Dean of Waterford.

Her paternal grandparents were Henry Wilson, 10th Baron Berners and the former Elizabeth Sumpter (a daughter of Thomas Sumpter, of Histon Hall). Her mother was a daughter and co-heiress of Col. George Crump, of Allexton Hall and the former Mary Wilson (the third daughter of Henry William Wilson, of Didlington Hall and Ashwellthorpe Hall, who was a sister of the 9th and 10th Barons Berners).

== Peerage ==
On 27 June 1871, she succeeded her uncle Henry, who had served as the President of the Royal Agricultural Society in 1858, as the 12th Baroness Berners, a title created in 1455 for her ancestor, John Bourchier (the fourth son of William Bourchier, 1st Count of Eu). Upon inheriting the title, she became the third suo jure Baroness Berners after Jane Knyvett, 3rd Baroness Berners (d. 1562) and Katherine Bokenham, 8th Baroness Berners (d. 1743).

Lady Berners was known to be "extremely religious", holding household prayer services for her staff, and "violently low-church," describing herself in Who's Who as "distinctly low".

== Personal life ==
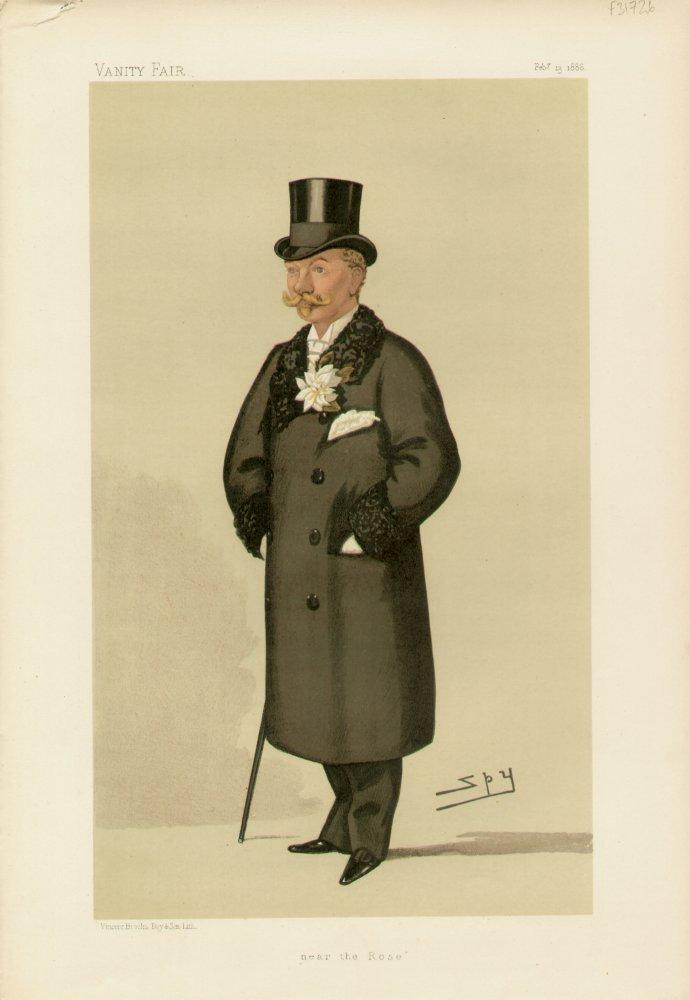
Caricature of her eldest son, the Hon. Harry Tyrwhitt-Wilson, by "Spy" (Sir Leslie Ward) in Vanity Fair, 1886

On 3 November 1853, Harriet married Sir Henry Tyrwhitt, 3rd Baronet of Stanley Hall, at St. Michael's, Pimlico. Sir Henry, a Lieutenant in the Rifle Brigade, was the son of Sir Thomas Tyrwhitt-Jones, 2nd Baronet (son of Thomas Tyrwhitt Jones, MP) and Eliza Walwyn Macnamara (the youngest daughter of John Macnamara, of Saint Kitts, West Indies). Together, they were the parents of nine sons and three daughters:

- Hon. Harry Tyrwhitt-Wilson (1854–1891), who served as Equerry to the Prince of Wales (later King Edward VII) and was involved in the Royal baccarat scandal; he lived at Keythorpe Hall and died unmarried.
- Raymond Robert Tyrwhitt-Wilson, 13th Baron Berners (1855–1918), the High Sheriff of Shropshire who died unmarried.
- Hon. Hugh Tyrwhitt (1856–1907), Private Secretary to First Lord of the Admiralty, and aide-de-camp to the Prince of Wales (later King George V); he married Julia Mary Foster, daughter of William Orme Foster, MP, of Apley Hall, in 1882. After his death in 1907, Julia married Col. William Ward Bennitt, of Stoke Green House, in 1908.
- Hon. Clement Tyrwhitt (1857–1939), who married Annie Webb, a daughter of John Webb, of Adelaide, Australia, in 1884.
- Hon. Rupert Tyrwhitt (1859–1940), a Major who married Louisa Isabel Frances Wells, eldest daughter of Walter Fox Williamson Wells of the Indian Civil Service, in 1900.
- Hon. Arden Mary Tyrwhitt (1860–1922), who married Francis Knollys, 1st Viscount Knollys, the son of Sir William Thomas Knollys, of Blount's Court.
- Hon. Philip Bourchier Tyrwhitt (1861–1938), a Sub-Lt. in the Royal Navy who married Grace Agnes (née May) Gallagher, widow of Hugh Gallagher, and daughter of John May, of Fitzwilliam Street, Dublin, in 1905.
- Hon. Leonard Francis Tyrwhitt (1863–1921), the Vicar of Fenton, Rector of Rolleston, Chaplain-in-Ordinary to Queen Victoria, and Canon of Windsor who also served in World War I as Chaplain to the Forces.
- Hon. Thomas Knyvet Tyrwhitt (1864–1886), who died unmarried.
- Hon. Sybil Grace Tyrwhitt (1866–1962), who married James Volant Wheeler, second son of Edward Vincent Wheeler DL, of Newnham Court, in 1895.
- Hon. Hester Efa Tyrwhitt (1869–1949), who died unmarried.
- Hon. John Tyrwhitt (1876–1937), a surveyor and civil engineer who married Florence Collins, a daughter of Richard Collins, of Victoria, Australia, in 1905.

In an autobiography, a descendant referred to her appearance as "not unlike Holbein's portrait of Bloody Mary with just a touch of Charley's Aunt."

Lady Berners died at Ashwellthorpe, Norwich on 18 August 1917. As her eldest son predeceased her, the barony passed to her second son, Sir Raymond, who had already inherited the Tyrwhitt baronetcy upon her husband's death in 1894.

=== Descendants ===
Through her third son Hugh, she was a grandmother to Gerald Tyrwhitt-Wilson, better known as Lord Berners, the composer, novelist, painter, and aesthete, upon whose death her husband's baronetcy became extinct. The barony, however, passed to her granddaughter, Vera, the eldest child of her fifth son, Rupert.

Through her daughter Arden, she was a grandmother to Edward Knollys, 2nd Viscount Knollys, the Governor of Bermuda.

Through her daughter Sybil, she was a grandmother to Wing Commander Vashon James Wheeler, a British Army and Royal Air Force officer who served as an infantry officer in both the First World War and the North Russia intervention, and then as a fighter and bomber pilot in the Second World War.

Peerage of England
Preceded by Henry William Wilson	Baroness Berners; 1871–1917	Succeeded by Raymond Tyrwhitt-Wilson
