= Pamela Kirkham, 16th Baroness Berners =

British parliamentarian (1929–2023)

Pamela Vivien Kirkham, 16th Baroness Berners (née Williams; 30 September 1929 – 23 January 2023) was a British hereditary peer who worked as a nurse in the National Health Service. She was a member of the House of Lords from 1995 to 1999.

== Family and career ==
Born in Gloucestershire, she was the elder daughter of Vera Ruby Tyrwhitt, 15th Baroness Berners, and Harold Williams JP. She was educated at Stonar School and Radcliffe Infirmary in Oxford, where she qualified as a State Registered Nurse in 1951, thereafter working in the National Health Service.

In 1952 she married Captain Michael Kirkham, an officer in the Derbyshire Yeomanry. They had three children.

== Peerage and succession ==
Upon her mother's death in 1992, the ancient Berners barony by writ of summons fell into abeyance between Pamela and her younger sister, Rosemary, the wife of Kelvin Pollock FCA. As is customary in such uncontested cases, the House of Lords Committee of Privileges terminated the abeyance in favour of the elder daughter. Pamela succeeded her mother as Lady Berners in 1995. She joined the Conservative benches in the House of Lords, where she sat until 1999, speaking about health and nursing matters.

Berners died from a stroke on 23 January 2023, at the age of 93. Her title passed to her elder son, Rupert William Tyrwhitt Kirkham, who on 12 February 1994 had married Lisa Lipsey, daughter of the decorated United States Air Force pilot, Colonel Edward Lipsey.

== See also ==
- Ashwellthorpe
- John Radcliffe Hospital
- Baron Berners

== Arms ==
Coat of arms of Pamela Kirkham, 16th Baroness Berners
Notes Style: The Lady Berners; Shield: displayed on a Lozenge Coronet Coronet of a Baroness Crest Not applicable Escutcheon Quarterly of ten: 1st Argent a Chevron reversed per pale Azure and Gules per chevron reversed counter-changed (Williams); 2nd Grandquarters (Tyrwhitt & Jones), quarterly of four first and fourth Gules three Peewits two and one Or, second and third Argent a Lion rampant Vert vulned in the mouth Proper; 3rd Gules three Peewits two and one Or (Tyrwhitt); 4th Argent three Boars' Heads erect and erased Sable (Booth); 5th Sable a Wolf salient Or in chief a Fleur-de-lys Argent between two Bezants (Wilson); 6th Argent a Bend Sable within a Bordure engrailed Sable (Knyvett); 7th Argent a Cross engrailed Gules between four Water Bougets Sable, over all a Label of three points Azure charged with three Lions rampant Or (Bourchier); 8th Gules Billety Or a Fess Argent (Lovayne); 9th Grandquarters, quarterly of four first and fourth France modern, second and third England all within a Bordure Argent (Thomas of Woodstock); 10th Quarterly Or and Vert (Berners). Supporters Dexter: A Falcon rising wings elevated Argent jessed and belled Or; Sinister: A Greyhound Proper gorged with a Collar Gules studded Or. Motto "Time tryeth truth" Symbolism The heraldic quarterings represent the family's descent since the creation of the Berners title for a cadet branch of the Bourchier family (7th quart.), which for example depict in the 2nd the arms of the Tyrwhitt-Wilson baronets and in the 9th Thomas of Woodstock (Duke of Gloucester)'s coat of arms:

Peerage of England
Preceded by Vera Williams	Baroness Berners; 1995–2023	Succeeded by Rupert Kirkham
