= Henry Morris Upcher =

English naturalist and ornithologist (1839–1921)

Henry Morris Upcher (15 December 1839 – 6 April 1921) was an English naturalist and ornithologist. He was born in Sheringham Hall, Upper Sheringham, Norfolk, England and took a keen interest in birds and wildlife from a very early age. He was the oldest of six brothers and little is known about his early life. He married Maria Hester Bowyer-Sparke on 10 June 1869 at Feltwell, Norfolk. He was High Sheriff of Norfolk in 1899 and was elected alderman to the county council in 1901. He took an interest in the protection of wild birds and when Pallas's sandgrouse were found visiting England in 1888 he worked to prevent them from being shot by sportsmen. He was a supporter of the Norfolk and Norwich Naturalists' Society of which he became a president in 1883. He was a member of the British Ornithologists' Union from 1864. Upcher's warbler was named after him by his friend Henry Baker Tristram.
