= Leonard Francis Tyrwhitt =

English canon (1863–1921)

Reverend The Honourable Leonard Francis Tyrwhitt OBE, MVO
- Born: 29 October 1863
- Died: 7 July 1921 (aged 57)
- Education: Marlborough College
- Alma mater: Magdalene College, Cambridge; Wells Theological College
- Parent(s): Sir Henry Thomas Tyrwhitt, 3rd Baronet; Harriet Tyrwhitt, 12th Baroness Berners
- Relatives: Hugh Tyrwhitt (brother)

Hon. Leonard Francis Tyrwhitt, MVO, OBE (29 October 1863 – 7 July 1921) was a Canon of Windsor from 1910 to 1921

== Early life ==
Tyrwhitt was born on 29 October 1863 as the seventh son of Sir Henry Thomas Tyrwhitt, 3rd Baronet and Harriet Tyrwhitt, 12th Baroness Berners. Among his siblings was Hon. Harry Tyrwhitt-Wilson (equerry to the Prince of Wales, later King Edward VII) Raymond Tyrwhitt-Wilson, 13th Baron Berners, Hugh Tyrwhitt (Private Secretary to First Lord of the Admiralty, and aide-de-camp to the Prince of Wales, later King George V), and Arden Tyrwhitt (wife of Francis Knollys, 1st Viscount Knollys).

He was educated at Marlborough College, Magdalene College, Cambridge and Wells Theological College.

== Career ==
He was appointed Vicar of Fenton, Staffordshire and served from 1897 to 1907. He also served as Rector of Rolleston on Dove, Burton-on-Trent and as the Hon. Chaplain to Queen Victoria. as well as Chaplain in ordinary to Queen Victoria and King Edward VII. During World War I, he served as Chaplain to the Forces from 1914 to 1919.

He was invested as a Member of the Royal Victorian Order in 1906, and was appointed Officer, Order of the British Empire in 1919.

He was appointed to the eleventh stall in St George's Chapel, Windsor Castle in 1910, and held the stall until 1921.

== Personal life ==
Tyrwhitt died, unmarried, on 7 July 1921 at a nursing home in Windsor after contracting trench fever in the War. His funeral was held at St George's Chapel, Windsor Castle and was conducted by the Dean of Windsor and assisted by Canon John Neale Dalton, Canon Edgar Sheppard, Minor Canon B. S. Everett, and Minor Canon L. G. Reed.
