= Thomas Knyvett, 7th Baron Berners =

English peer and MP (1655/56-1693)

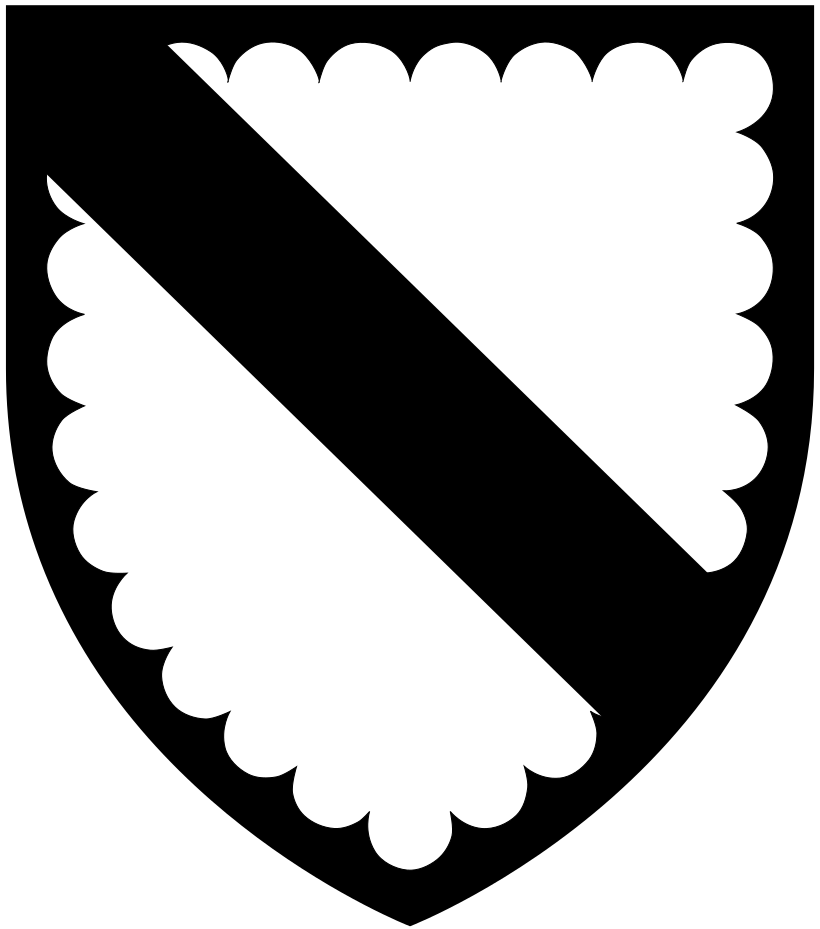
Arms of Knyvett: Argent, a bend sable a bordure engrailed of the last

Thomas Knyvett, 7th Baron Berners (1655 or 1656 – 28 September 1693) was an English peer and Tory politician.

The son of Sir John Knyvett and Mary Bedingfield, he was baptised in Darsham in Suffolk in February 1655 or 1656. In 1673, Knyvett succeeded his father de jure as Baron Berners. He was member of parliament (MP) for Dunwich from 1685 to 1687 and for Eye from 1689 to 1690.

Knyvett died unmarried and was buried in Ashwellthorpe in Norfolk on 30 September 1693. With his death the barony fell into abeyance, but was terminated in 1711 in favour of his sister Katherine Bokenham.

Parliament of England
Preceded by Sir Philip Skippon; Sir Robert Kemp, Bt	Member of Parliament for Dunwich; 1685–1687; With: Roger North	Succeeded by Sir Robert Rich, Bt; Sir Philip Skippon
Preceded by Sir Charles Gawdy; Sir John Rous	Member of Parliament for Eye; 1689–1690; With: Henry Poley	Succeeded by Henry Poley; Thomas Davenant
Peerage of England
Preceded by John Knyvett	Baron Berners (de jure); 1673–1693	Succeeded by Abeyant (terminated in 1711 for); Katherine Bokenham
