= Sheringham Hall =

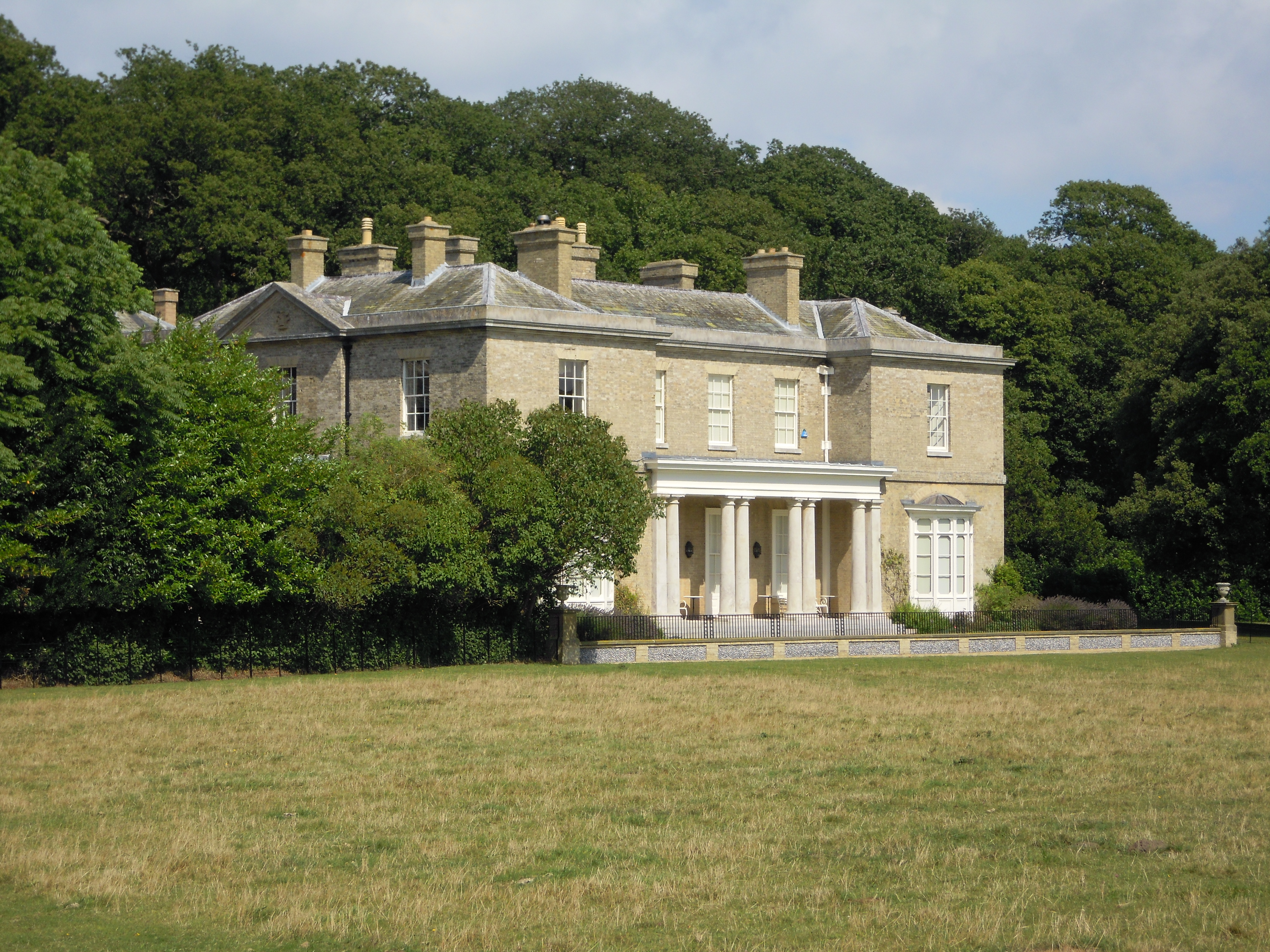
- The south elevation

- Location within Norfolk

General information
- Type: Historic house
- Location: Upper Sheringham, Sheringham Hall, Upper Sheringham, Norfolk, NR26 8TB, Sheringham, England
- Coordinates: 52.9359°N 1.1736°E
- Construction started: July 1813
- Completed: 1817
- Client: Abbot and Charlotte Upcher

Technical details
- Structural system: Gault-brick house with Welsh slate roof

Design and construction
- Architects: John Adey Repton (hall), Humphrey Repton (landscape)

Website

Listed Building – Grade II
- Designated: 30 September 1987
- Reference no.: 1049799

Sheringham Hall is a Grade II* listed building which stands in the grounds of its park. The house is close to the village of Upper Sheringham in the English County of Norfolk in the United Kingdom. The hall was built on the instructions of Abbot and Charlotte Upcher who engaged the architect and landscape designer Humphry Repton and his son John Adey Repton to build the house and to present designs for the surrounding parkland. Humphry worked on the landscape and John Adey designed the hall. National Trust members and guests have no rights of access across the park and farmland surrounding Sheringham Hall. Access is solely at the discretion of the owners of George Youngs (Farms) Ltd which farms the Sheringham estate. George Youngs (Farms) Ltd is owned by Paul Doyle and Gergely Battha-Pajor who also own the long leasehold of Sheringham Hall.

== Description ==
The main body of the house is two storeys and has a low pitched slate roof. To the south facing facade there is a bay to each side with a portico with four pairs Tuscan columns creating a veranda. This leads out on to a terrace which runs across the front of the south elevation. There is a porch over the main door on the western façade which is also supported by two pairs of Tuscan columns. Above is a pediment embellished with the Upcher crest of a unicorn surrounded by five ostrich feathers. Inside the house on the ground floor there are five rooms. The three rooms on the south front of the building start with a parlour to the south west corner, a dining room to the centre and a living room and library to the south east corner which takes up the whole of the east side of the house. Off this room there is a recess to the eastern elevation. At the back of the house there is a study to the north west corner which leads off from the main door hallway. Next to the study is the service staircase down to the cellar and next to that is the main stairwell of a main corridor which runs through the centre of the house linking the main hall, dining room, stairwell and library-living room at the eastern end. To the north and west attached to the main body of the house there is a service wing. The main staircase is a curved cantilevered stair with stone treads with shaped soffits. The balustrade sits on the inner open stringer and is fabricated from cast iron with a hexagonal pattern. The handrail is made from hand carved wreathed mahogany with mother of pearl and ebony inlay at the turned newel post.

=== Other estate buildings ===
==== The stable block and coachman's house ====
Set back and to the west of the hall stands the stable block and coachman's house which were also designed by John Adey Repton. This building is also a Grade II listed building. The brick built building is faced with pebble flintwork with gault brick quoining. The building is topped with a Welsh slate roof which has a central wooden cupola bell turret faced with a clock. This is topped with a gilded arrow weathervane. In front of the block is an enclosed courtyard with brick walls.

==== Ivy Lodge ====
At the southern main entrance to the estate the gatehouse is called Ivy Lodge and was designed in the Cottage orné style by the Reptons. This lodge is also a Grade II listed building. The lodge is built over two storeys with the ground floor faced in Norfolk red bricks. The second floor is faced in pebble dashed render with some parts of render panels between black timber vertical stud posts. The south east corner of the lodge has a circular forward facing wing. The roof is now finished in plain red tiles and has wide overhanging eaves with finial to the top of the turreted roof. The lodge was extensively renovated in 1905 when the thatched roof was replaced with the tiled roof.

==== Lodge cottage ====
The hall and estate's east entrance from the nearby village of Upper Sheringham passes by another entrance lodge simply known as Lodge cottage. It is built over two storeys and is built from brick faced with pebble flint work with Norfolk red brick quoining. The south elevation has a projecting bay with a hip roof with the upper storey clad in dark shiplap timber planking. The house has a Norfolk pantile roof.

==== West Lodge ====
The West Lodge gatehouse is situated just off the A149 coast road between Sheringham and Weybourne. It is on the north-west corner of Oak Wood which is the estate's area of woodland on the hill north of the Hall. This gatehouse is no longer part of the estate and the drive which ran to the hall from here is no longer connected to the estate or hall. The building is a two-storey flint and tile house with a pantile roof and has been a private residence for many years.

==== The walled garden and gardener’s cottage ====
The walled garden and cottage are 250 metres to the north-east of the house and were constructed at the same time as the hall, and again to the Reptons' plans. The wall and cottage are Grade II listed. The garden is rectangular in plan and is bounded with high brick walls which are part-buttressed at stress points around the enclosure. The south wall of the garden has a number of lean-to greenhouses either side of the boundary wall. There are several auxiliary buildings and potting sheds. At the north-east corner of the enclosure there is a two-storey gardener's cottage which is integral to the boundary wall and a further two buildings attached to the north wall. The garden inside the walls was redesigned by Arabella Lennox-Boyd (born 1938). A classical openwork pavilion in cast iron was designed by John Simpson and erected in 2012 to mark the sixtieth year of the reign of Elizabeth II and the bicentenary of Humphry and John Adey Repton’s designs for Sheringham. The enclosure has three access points. The main entrance is a double door with brick support piers to either side which is located in the middle of the west wall. There is a connecting driveway to the hall from here. A second entrance is in the south wall near to the buildings located there. The third access is a single entrance in the south-west corner of the garden.

== History ==
The current hall in Sheringham park was built close to the site of an earlier Jacobean style hall, which was demolished, that had stood some 600 metres east of today's hall. This house stood in a smaller estate and was owned by Cook Flower's family who were an influential family from the Sheringham area. Records show that a Cook Flower was one of three lords of the manor in Sheringham In 1792 Cook Flower bought the previous house that stood here. It was described as an extensive and attractive estate. It was Cook Flower who began to landscape and plant the woodland on the hilltops around the house leaving the rolling pastures below as arable farmland.

=== Sale to Abbot Upcher ===
Abbot Upcher was the son of Peter and Elizabeth Upcher of Ormesby St Michael a small village seven miles from Great Yarmouth. He was married to Charlotte Wilson (eldest daughter of Henry Wilson, 10th Baron Berners) and now had a rapidly growing family with a son called Henry Ramey Upcher and a daughter called Charlotte Mary. Upcher decided that what his family needed was a larger house and in 1811 he purchased the estate and the existing manor house owned by Cook Flower at Sheringham. After some negotiation a fee of £52,000 was agreed between the two men and an agreement was signed with Flowers legal representative by the name of William Repton who resided in Aylsham. William Repton was the son of Humphry Repton the landscape designer and architect. Upcher attended dinner with William Repton at the time of the purchase of the hall and estate and it was at this dinner where Upcher was introduced to William Repton's father Humphry Repton, the Landscape architect. It was during this dinner where it was discussed and agreed that Repton's father should oversee the design and construction of the house and the estate. Humphry Repton concentrated on the Landscaping whilst his other son, John Adey Repton was placed in charge of the design and construction of the new hall. At this time Britain was at War with its North American colonies and its American Indian allies. This along with the continuing war with France, had put the country into a deep recession. Repton was pleased to get the work, as in recent times his business had dried up and was putting him into increasing difficulties. He had also been badly injured in a carriage accident which had left him disabled and confined to a bath chair. The Upcher contract came as welcome relief. For the same reasons, Upcher had toned down his plans for his home and estate.

=== Construction ===
Two years after Upcher had purchased the property work finally began on the new hall on 2 July 1812. By this time Humphry Repton had begun to recover from his accident but he increasingly relied on his son for the day-to-day running of the contract. One of the first scheduled jobs was to construct a new track (Now known as the Back Drive) down to the coast road which would be necessary to transport all the building materials to the estate. The Gault bricks for the face brickwork of the hall were from Lincolnshire and were brought to Norfolk by sea. Other materials arrived along the new road. Other building materials used on the new hall were reclamations from local sources. These included Oak retrieved from a wrecked ship at Blakeney and other timber from a local demolished granary. The Reptons employed a clerk of works to oversee the job on the recommendation of Abbot Upcher. He had been the master of a local workhouse and although Upcher admired the man's diligence and enthusiastic attitude, this did not make up for his inexperience in the building trade. Upcher allowed the clerk to have the wooden arch centres which had been used to form the cellar, removed prematurely. This was done at a time when there had been torrential rain in the area for several days. Unsurprisingly the removal of the arch Centring caused the collapse of the cellar ceiling throwing progress back quite considerably. The construction of the house ran simultaneously with the landscaping of the estate. This work also included a terrace garden to the north of the hall which sat in the lee of the hill.

=== Tragedy ===
During the period of construction of the new house Abbot and his wife Charlotte moved into Cook Flower's old farmhouse close to the village of Upper Sheringham. By 1817 the house was nearing completion and the family hoped to move into the hall by the summer of that year. There was still work needed on the interior of the house and the work moved on to 1818. Unfortunately in March 1818 Humphry Repton died as a consequence of the ill health caused by his carriage accident which he had never fully recovered from. In just under a year later Abbot Upcher died in February 1819 succumbing to the illness that had plagued his health for many years, He was aged 35. By the time of Abbot's death the house was all but finished, but his wife Charlotte had lost interest in the new house and stayed in the old farmhouse. By the time of Abbot's death the house had cost £6,600. Work was stopped on the house and it remained empty and unfinished until Abbot and Charlotte's son Henry Ramey Upcher married and he finished the hall and moved in with his family in 1839. Charlotte had remained in the farmhouse and dedicated herself to the village's wellbeing, the church and her family. She was also instrumental in the inauguration of Sheringham's first lifeboat, the Augusta.

=== Upcher residency ===
By the time that Henry Upcher had finally completed the hall and moved in with his family, the cost for the build had risen to £12,618. Henry lived in the hall with his wife Caroline and his 11 children. He died on the 30 March 1892 leaving the hall to Henry Morris Upcher who was his eldest son, and his wife Maria. Henry was instrumental in the development of Sheringham town and spent time and money promoting the seaside resort, increasing its popularity. Henry also became the High Sheriff of Norfolk in 1899 and was elected alderman to the County Council in 1901. Henry had seven children and he left the hall to his eldest son Henry Edward Sparke Upcher. Henry Edward Sparke Upcher was knighted and from 1941 until 1950 he was Chairman of Norfolk County Council. Sir Henry died in 1954 and left his estate to his only child, a son. His full name was Henry Thomas Simpson Upcher but he went by the name Thomas. It was Thomas who completed Humphry Repton's design for the estate when he erected a Temple in the park. This had always been included in Repton's original red book scheme for the estate. The Temple was built in 1975, 160 years after it was first envisaged by Repton, Thomas Upcher had it built to celebrate his seventieth birthday and although it is in a slightly different position to Repton's original specification it still commands the views of the estate and surrounding countryside intended by Repton. Thomas Upcher died in 1985. He was a bachelor and had no heir to whom to leave the property. In 1986 the National Trust bought the wider estate and opened parts of it to the general public. The Hall is not open to the public and is owned privately on a long leasehold.

== Gallery ==
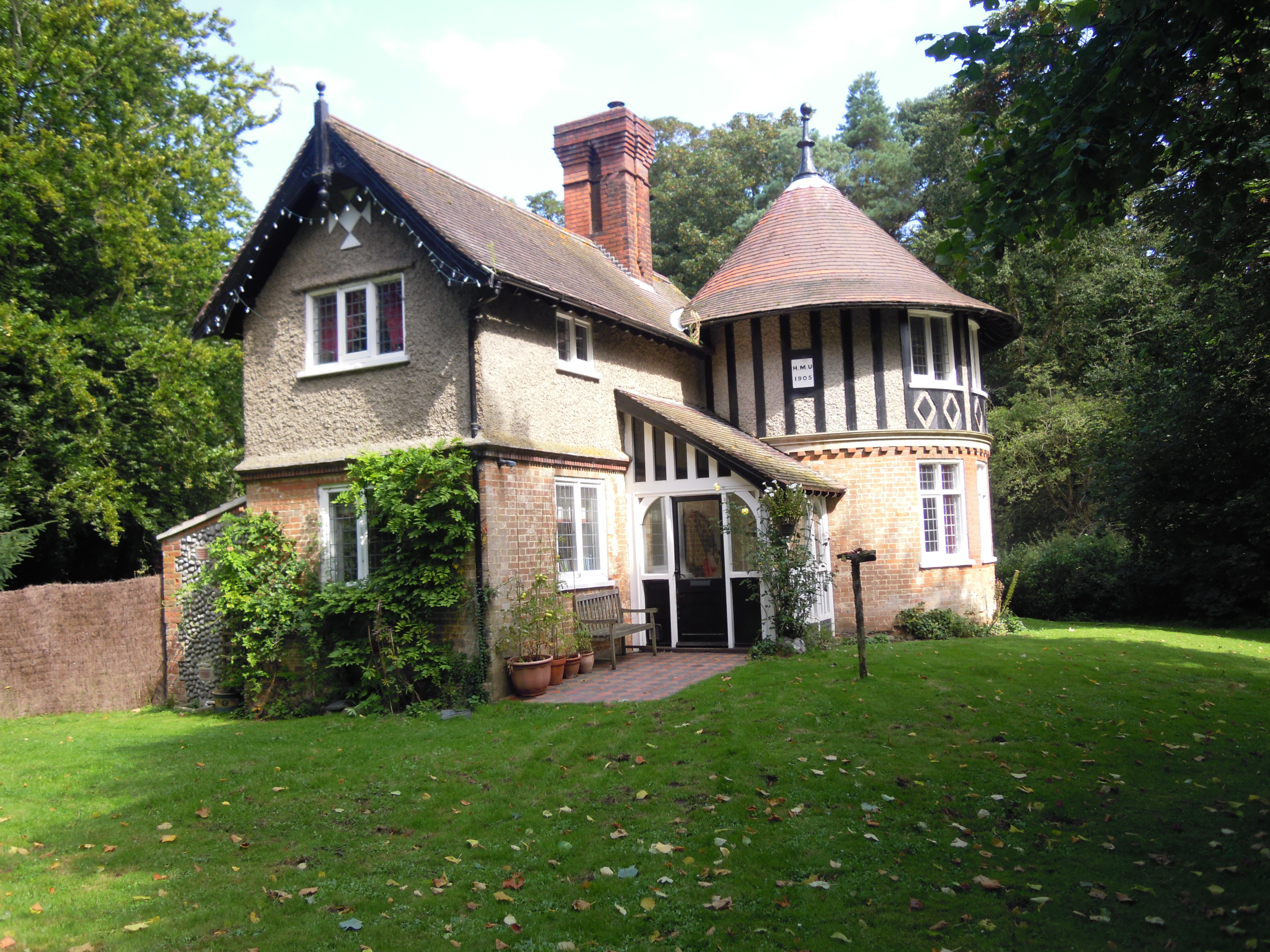
Ivy Lodge was at the southern main driveway into Sheringham estate.

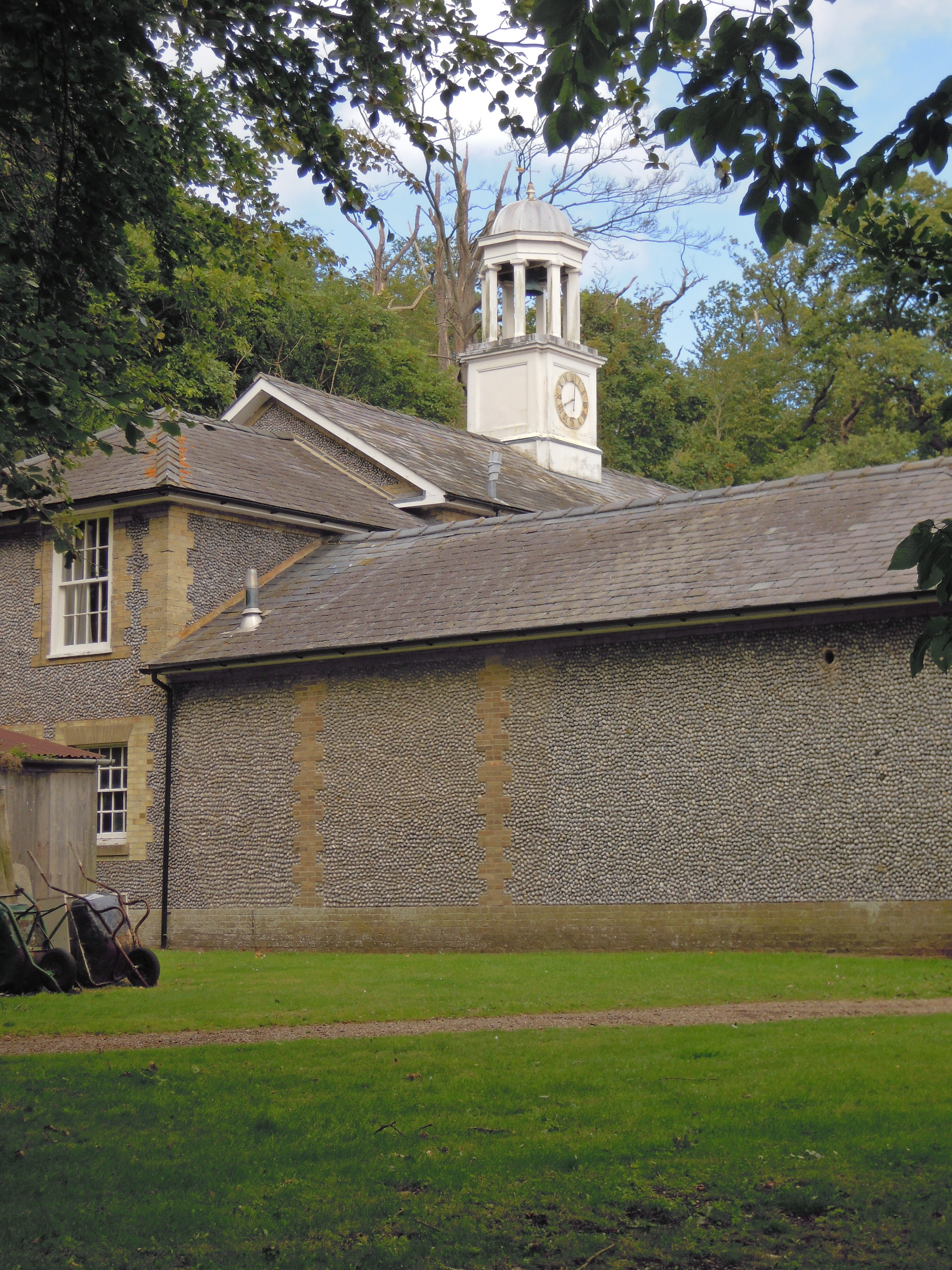
The stable block at Sheringham Hall with its cupola bell turret faced with a clock.

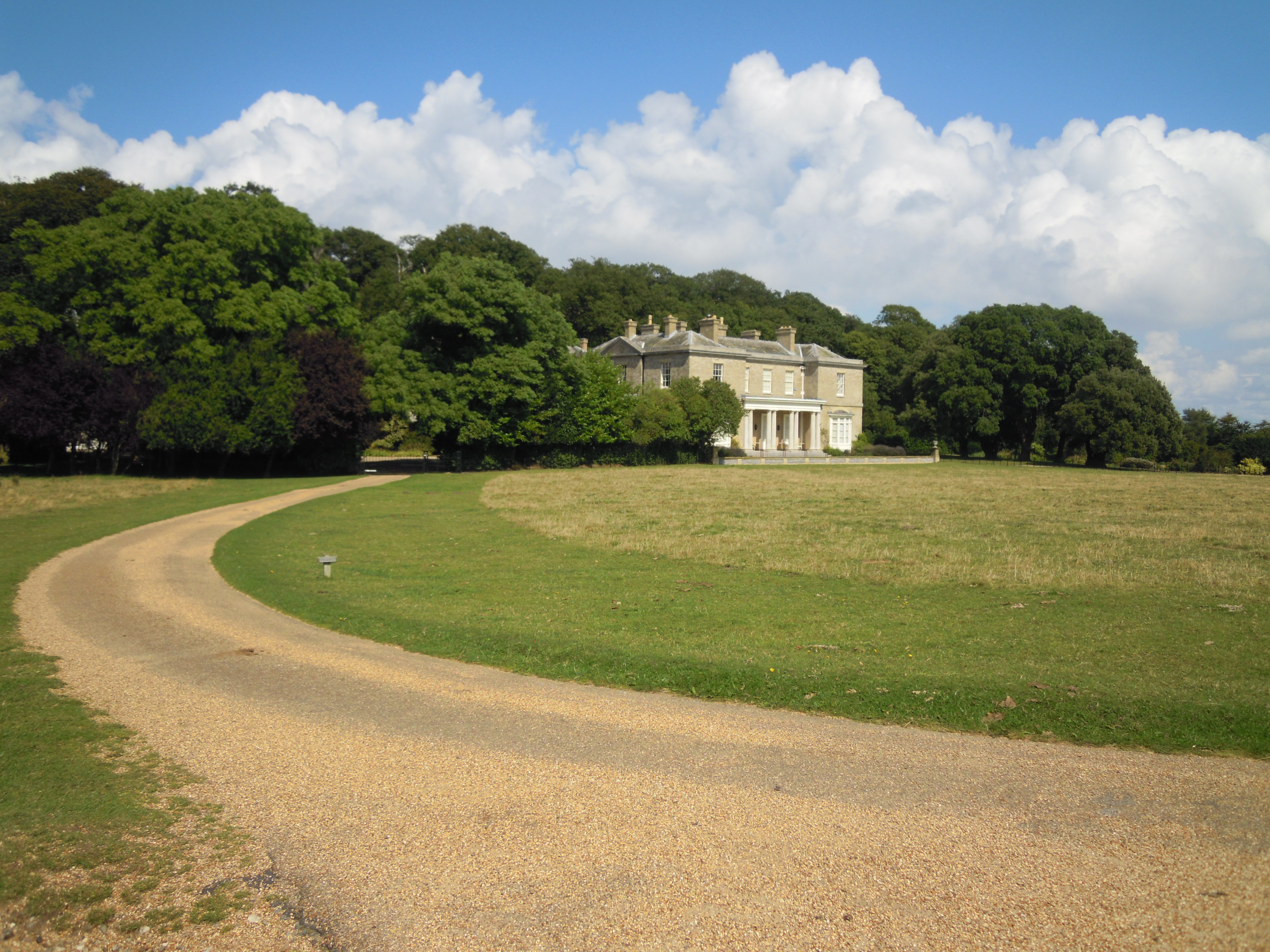
The approach to the hall along the southern driveway.

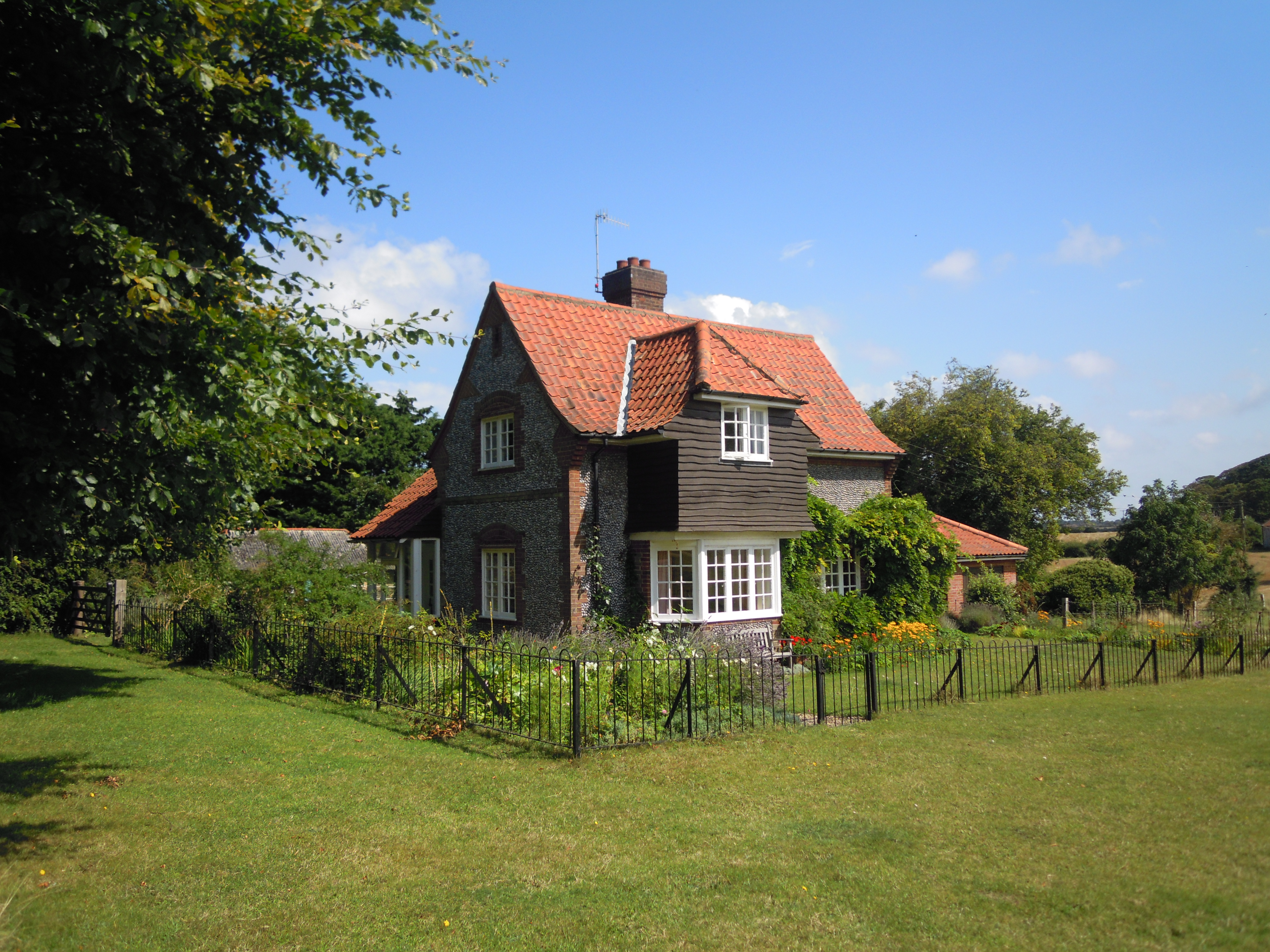
Park Lodge on the driveway from Upper Sheringham village to the east of the hall.
