= Baron Berners =

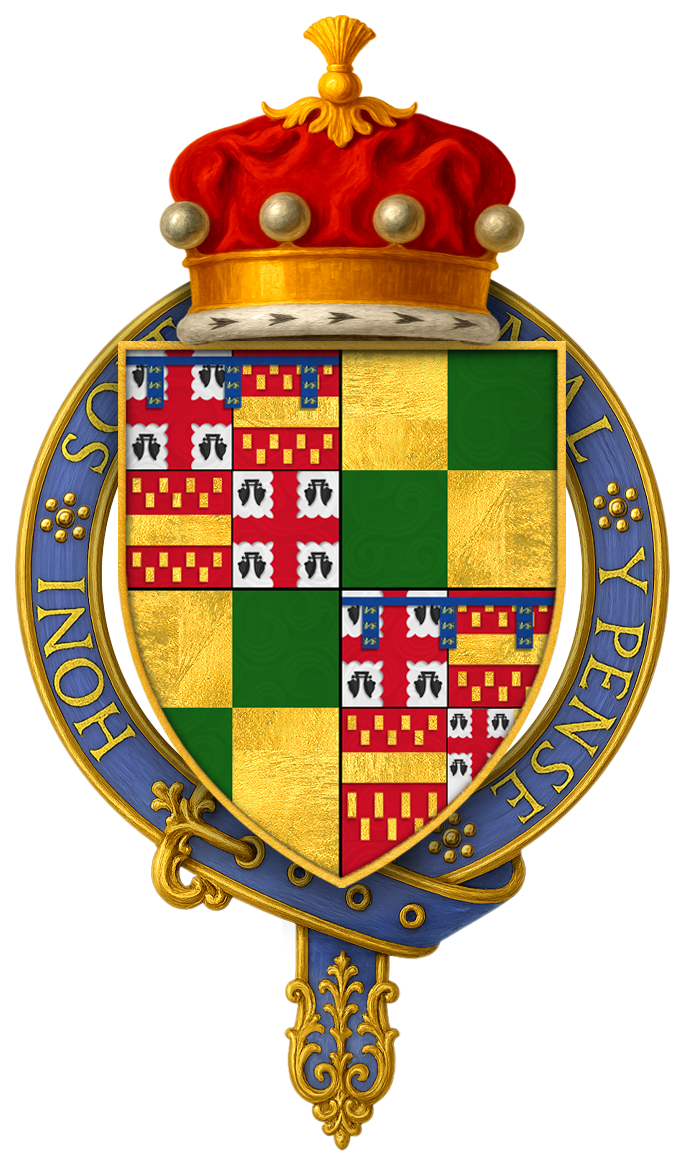
Quartered arms of John Bourchier, 1st Baron Berners (d. 1474), KG

Baron Berners is a barony created by writ in the Peerage of England.

== From creation to first abeyance (1455–1693) ==
Arms of Bourchier: Argent, a cross engrailed gules between four water bougets sable

The barony was created in 1455 for Sir John Bourchier, youngest son of William Bourchier, 1st Count of Eu, and younger brother of Henry Bourchier, 1st Earl of Essex and of William Bourchier, 9th Baron FitzWarin (from whom the Bourchier Earls of Bath descended). He married Margery Berners, daughter of Sir Richard Berners. The peerage is so ancient as to have been established by writ, and thus can descend through both male and female lines (in the absence of an official grant of remainder). He was succeeded by his grandson John Bourchier, 2nd Baron Berners, who served as Chancellor of the Exchequer between 1516 and 1527 and is well known in literature as Lord Berners, having made a well-regarded English translation of Froissart's Chronicles.

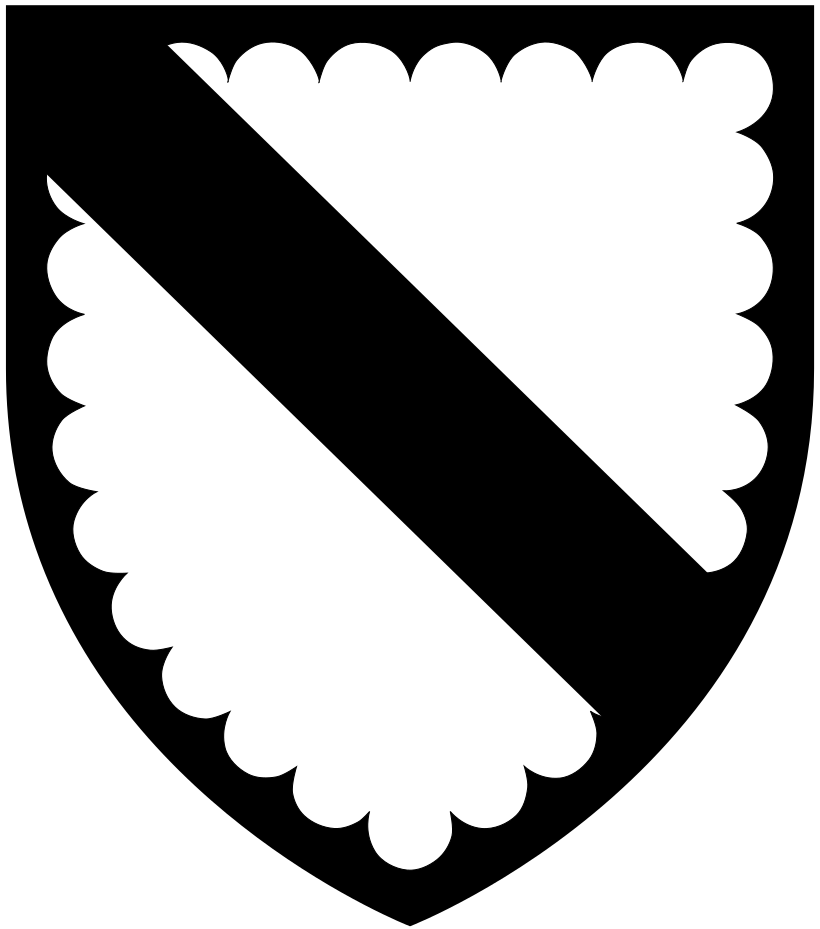
Arms of Knyvett: Argent, a bend sable a bordure engrailed of the last

He died without male progeny and was thus succeeded by his daughter Jane Bourchier, wife of Sir Edmund Knyvett and de jure 3rd Baroness Berners, although she never assumed the title. Her grandson Thomas Knyvett, the de jure 4th Baron, received a writ of summons in this title but died before obtaining the King's confirmation. His great-great-grandson Sir Thomas Knyvett, the de jure 7th Baron Berners, sat as a Member of Parliament for Dunwich and Eyre. On his death in 1693 the peerage fell into abeyance between his two sisters, Elizabeth Knyvett, wife of Sir Thomas Glemham, and Katherine Knyvett, wife firstly of John Harris and secondly of Richard Bokenham.

== From restoration to death of 14th Baron (1711–1950) ==
The barony by writ of summons remained in abeyance until 1711, when, on the death of Sir Thomas Glenham, only child of Elizabeth Glenham (see above), the peerage title devolved on the aforementioned Katherine Bokenham, who became the de jure eighth holder.

In 1720 she was confirmed by the House of Lords as 8th Baroness Berners. However, on her death in 1743 the barony again fell into abeyance, this time between the heirs of the sisters Elizabeth Knyvett (wife of Henry Wilson) and Lucy Knyvett (wife firstly of Thomas Holt and secondly of John Field), both great-granddaughters of Thomas Knyvett, younger brother of John Knyvett, 6th Baron Berners. This time the peerage remained in abeyance for 89 years, until the abeyance was terminated in 1832 in favour of Robert Wilson, who became the ninth Baron. He was the grandson of Elizabeth Knyvett. He was succeeded by his younger brother, the tenth Baron. When he died the title passed to his son, the eleventh Baron.

He died childless and was succeeded by his niece Harriet Tyrwhitt, the twelfth Baroness. She was the daughter of Hon. Robert Wilson, younger son of the tenth Baron, and wife of Sir Henry Thomas Tyrwhitt, 3rd Baronet (see below for earlier history of this title). She was succeeded by her son, the thirteenth Baron. In 1892 he assumed by Royal Licence the additional surname of Wilson and in 1894 succeeded his father as the fourth baronet, of Stanley Hall; he did not marry and was succeeded by his nephew, the fourteenth Baron, a writer, painter and composer of classical music. He also never married and on his death in 1950 the baronetcy became extinct.

== Tyrwhitt baronetcy ==
The Tyrwhitt baronetcy, of Stanley Hall in the County of Shropshire, was created in the Baronetage of the United Kingdom on 3 October 1808 for Thomas Tyrwhitt Jones. He represented Weymouth and Melcombe Regis, Denbigh Boroughs, Athlone and Shrewsbury in the House of Commons. Born Thomas Tyrwhitt, he assumed by Royal Licence the additional surname of Jones in 1790. His son, the second baronet, was High Sheriff of Shropshire in 1816 and sat as a Member of Parliament for Bridgnorth (1818–1820). He was succeeded by his son, the aforementioned Sir Henry Thomas Tyrwhitt, 3rd Baronet, who married Harriet Wilson, 12th Baroness Berners. Their son Raymond Robert Tyrwhitt-Wilson succeeded in both the baronetcy and barony.

== Succession of the Berners barony ==
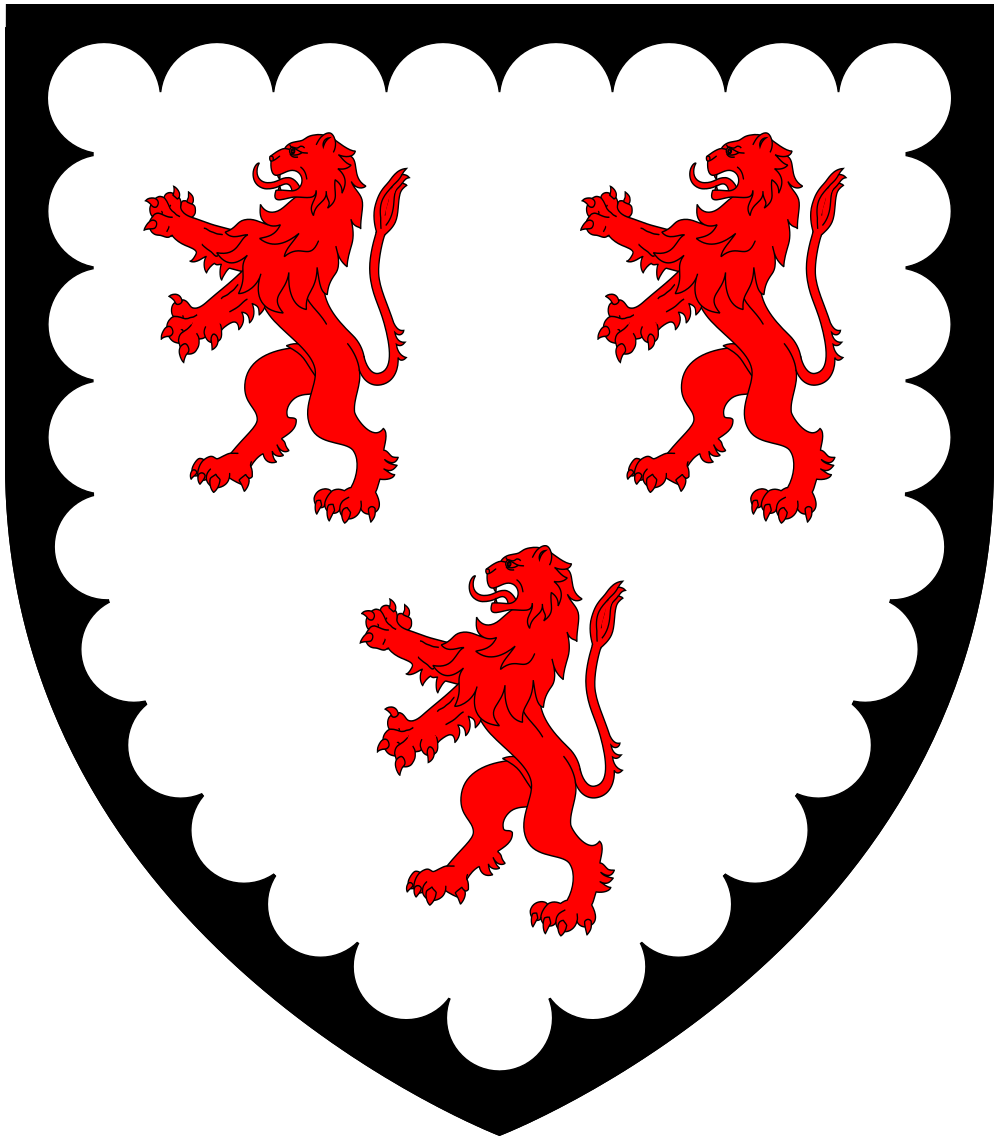
Arms of Kirkham, borne by the present heir apparent to the barony of Berners: Argent, three lions rampant gules a bordure engrailed sable

However, he was succeeded in the barony of Berners by his first cousin Vera Ruby Tyrwhitt (1901–1992) (daughter of Hon. Rupert Tyrwhitt, fifth son of the 12th Baroness), who became the 15th Baroness Berners and married Harold Williams (d.1971). On her death in 1992 the barony again fell into abeyance between her two daughters, namely Hon. Pamela Vivien Williams, the eldest, wife of Michael Joseph Sperry Kirkham, and Hon. Rosemary Tyrwhitt Williams, wife of Kelvin Alexander Pollock. In 1995 the abeyance was terminated in favour of the elder daughter, Pamela Vivien Kirkham.

== Barons Berners (1455) ==
- John Bourchier, 1st Baron Berners (d. 1474)
- John Bourchier, 2nd Baron Berners (1467–1533)
- Jane Knyvett, de jure 3rd Baroness Berners (d. 1562)
- Thomas Knyvett, de jure 4th Baron Berners (c. 1539–1618)
- Thomas Knyvett, de jure 5th Baron Berners (1596–1658)
- John Knyvett, de jure 6th Baron Berners (d. 1673)
- Thomas Knyvett, de jure 7th Baron Berners (d. 1693) (abeyant 1693)
- Katherine Bokenham, 8th Baroness Berners (1658–1743) (abeyance terminated 1711; abeyant 1743)
- Robert Wilson, 9th Baron Berners (1761–1838) (abeyance terminated 1832; abeyant 1838)
- Henry Wilson, 10th Baron Berners (1762–1851) (abeyance terminated 1838)

- Henry William Wilson, 11th Baron Berners (1797–1871)
- Harriet Tyrwhitt, née Wilson, 12th Baroness Berners (1835–1917)
- Raymond Robert Tyrwhitt-Wilson, 13th Baron Berners (1855–1918)
- Gerald Hugh Tyrwhitt-Wilson, 14th Baron Berners (1883–1950) (Tyrwhitt baronetcy extinct)
- Vera Ruby Williams, 15th Baroness Berners (1901–1992) (abeyant 1992)
- Pamela Vivien Kirkham, 16th Baroness Berners (1929–2023) (abeyance terminated 1995)
- Rupert William Tyrwhitt Kirkham, 17th Baron Berners (b. 1953)

The heir apparent is the present holder's son the Hon. Edward Michael Tyrwhitt Kirkham (b. 1994).

== Tyrwhitt Baronets, of Stanley Hall (1808) ==

- Sir Thomas Tyrwhitt Jones, 1st Baronet (1765–1811)
- Sir Thomas John Tyrwhitt Jones, 2nd Baronet (1793–1839)
- Sir Henry Thomas Tyrwhitt, 3rd Baronet (1824–1894)
- Sir Raymond Robert Tyrwhitt-Wilson, 4th Baronet (1855–1918) (succeeded as Baron Berners in 1917)

See 13th & 14th Lord Berners for later holders of the baronetcy

== See also ==
- Earl of Essex (1461 creation)
- Earl of Bath (1536 creation)

== Notes ==
Baronetage of the United Kingdom
Preceded by Montgomery baronets	Tyrwhitt baronets of Stanley Hall; 3 October 1808	Succeeded by Corbet baronets
