= Upper Sheringham =

Village in Norfolk, England

Coordinates: 52.93141°N 1.18966°E

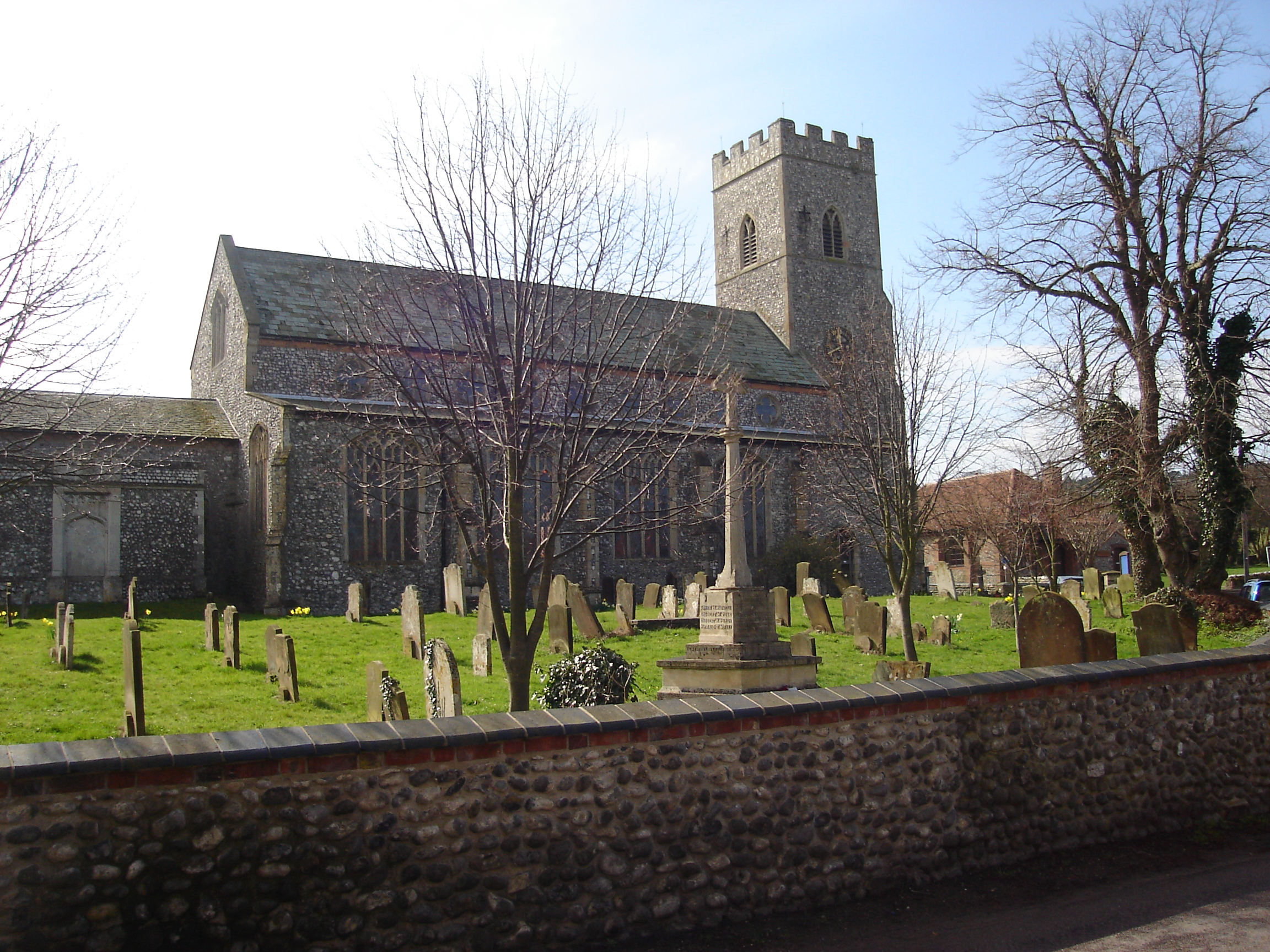
- All Saints' Church

- Location within Norfolk
- Area: 6.19 km^{2} (2.39 sq mi)
- Population: 209 (parish, 2011 census)
  - Density: 34/km^{2} (88/sq mi)
- OS grid reference: TG1441
  - London: 132 miles (212 km)
- Civil parish: Upper Sheringham
- District: North Norfolk
- Shire county: Norfolk
- Region: East
- Country: England
- Sovereign state: United Kingdom
- Post town: SHERINGHAM
- Postcode district: NR26
- Dialling code: 01263
- Police: Norfolk
- Fire: Norfolk
- Ambulance: East of England
- UK Parliament: North Norfolk

Upper Sheringham is a village and civil parish in the English county of Norfolk. The village is 26.8 miles (43.1 km) north-north-west of Norwich, 6 miles (9.7 km) west of Cromer and 132 miles (212 km) north-north-east of London. The village is 1.2 miles (1.9 km) from the town of Sheringham.

The nearest railway station is at Sheringham for the Bittern Line which runs between Sheringham, Cromer and Norwich. The nearest airport is Norwich International Airport. Nearby road connections are the A149 King's Lynn to Great Yarmouth road to the north of the village and the A148 King's Lynn]to Cromer road just to the south. The parish of Upper Sheringham at the 2001 census had a population of 214, reducing slightly to 209 at the 2011 census. For the purposes of local government, the parish falls within the district of North Norfolk.

== Description ==
The name Sheringham is of Scandinavian origin and has the meaning The Ham of Scira’s people. It is thought that Scira may have been a Viking warlord who was given the land as a reward for his performance in battle. The village is located a little south west below the town of Sheringham. The village is bound to the west by Sheringham Hall and its estate. To the south is the hill line known as the Cromer Ridge. The village is known locally as "Upper Town" as compared to the town of Sheringham (formerly Lower Sheringham) itself.

== All Saints' Church ==
The Church of England parish church of All Saints is famous for its 15th-century bench ends including one, just inside the north door, of a mermaid. The church also retains the floor and front parapet of the rood loft described as "the best survival of its kind in all East Anglia's 1200-odd medieval churches".

== Gallery ==
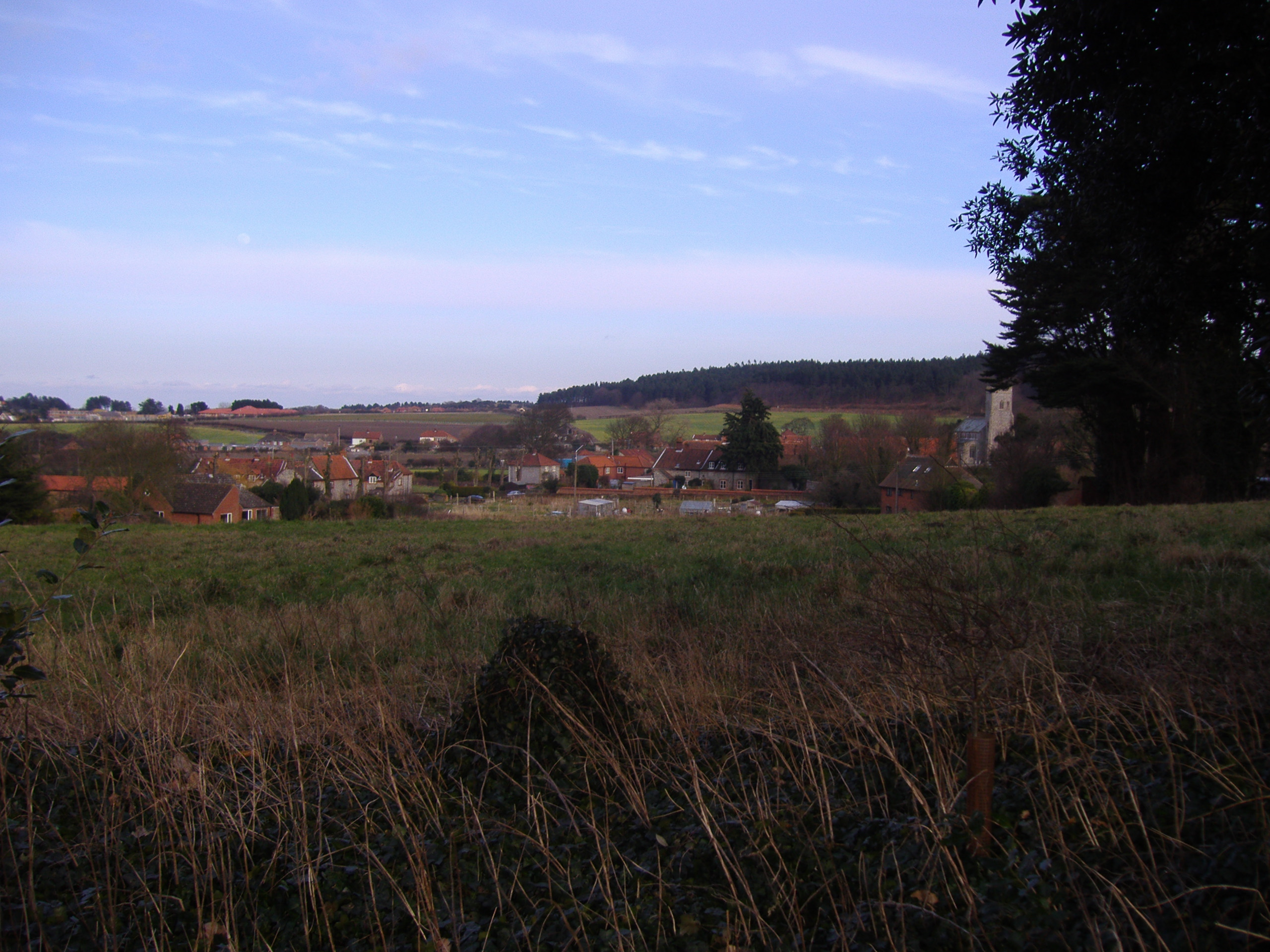
The village

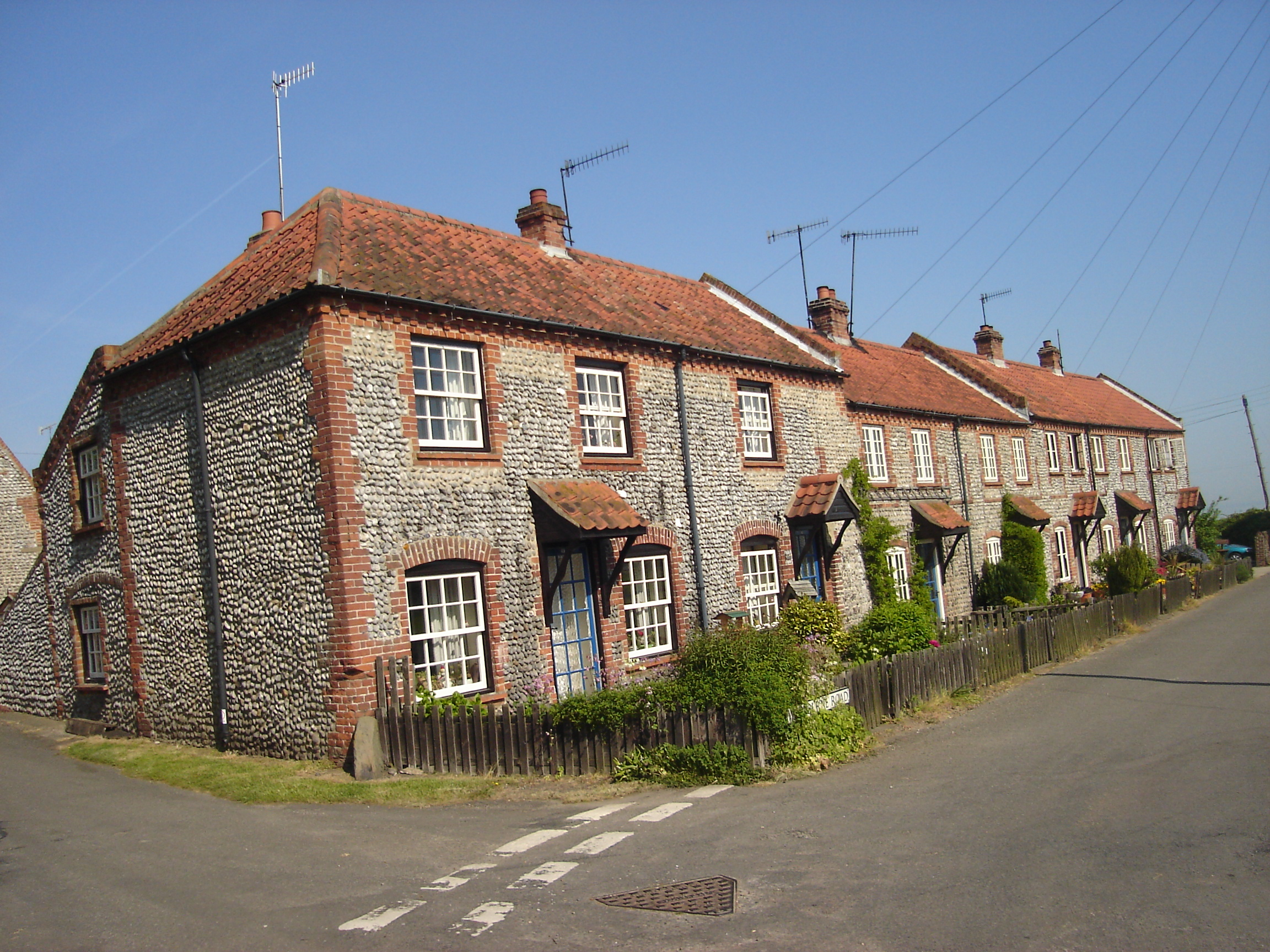
Row of cottages

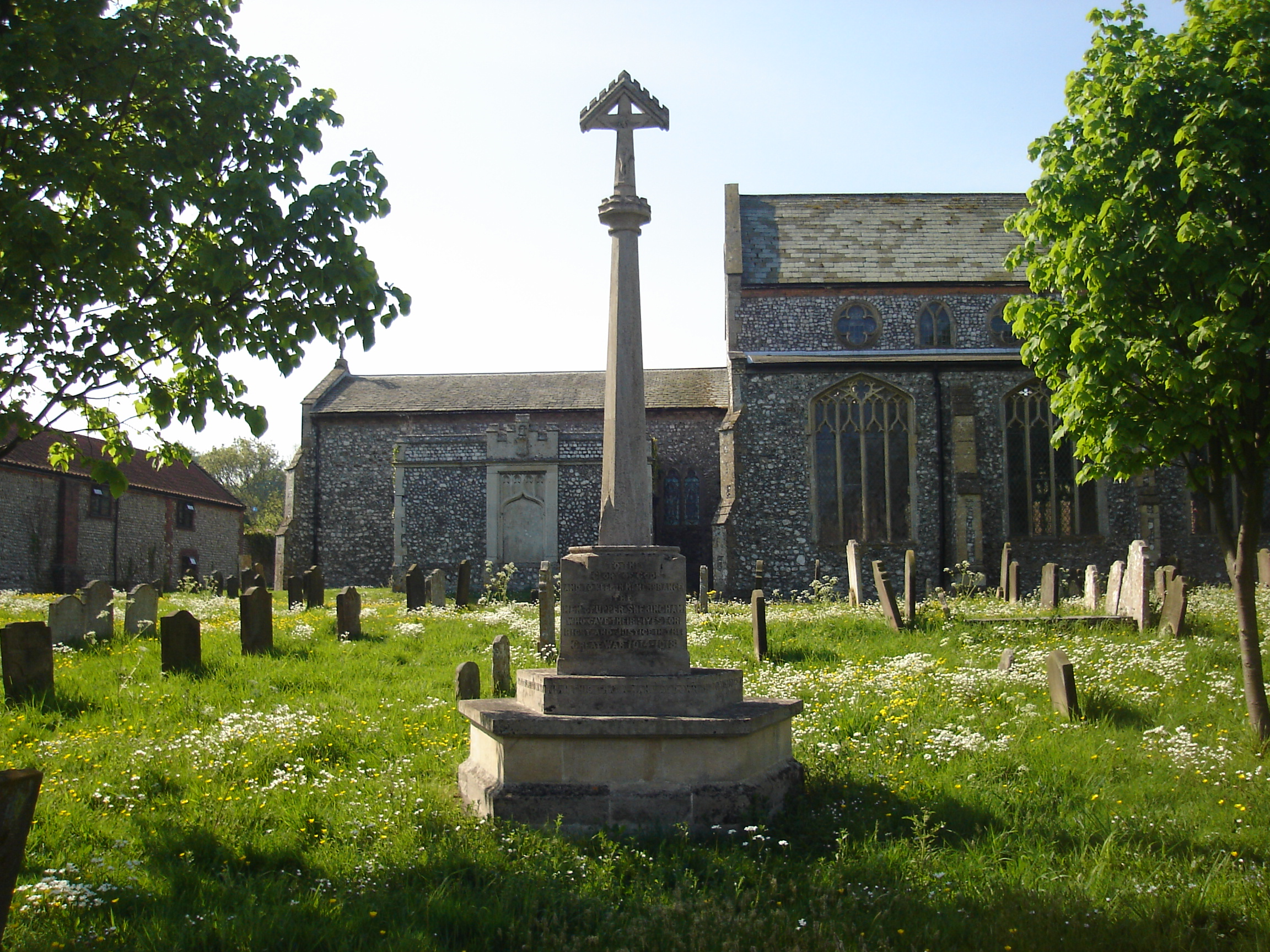
The war memorial located at the church of All Saints

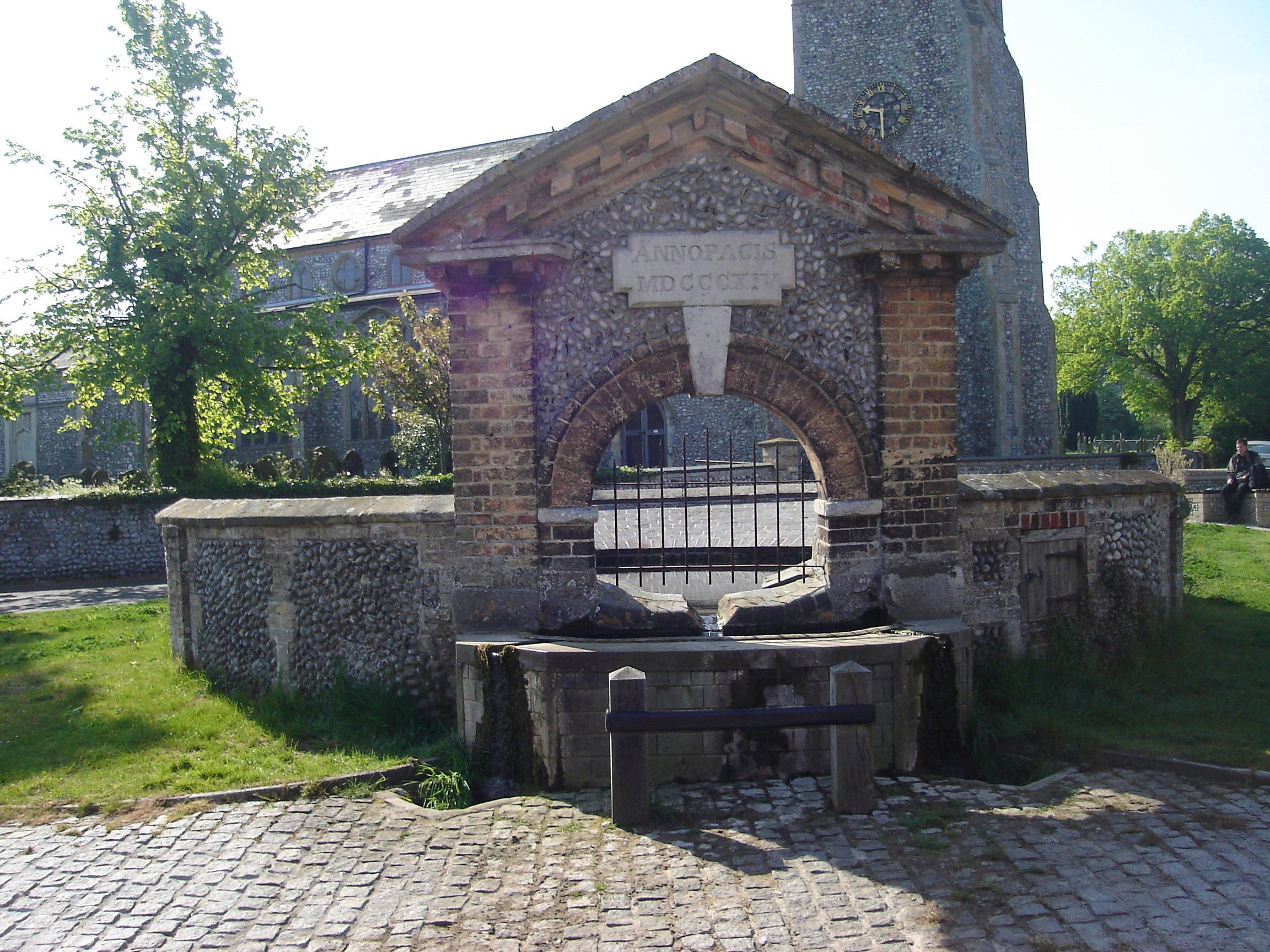
The reservoir. All Saints' Church is in the background.

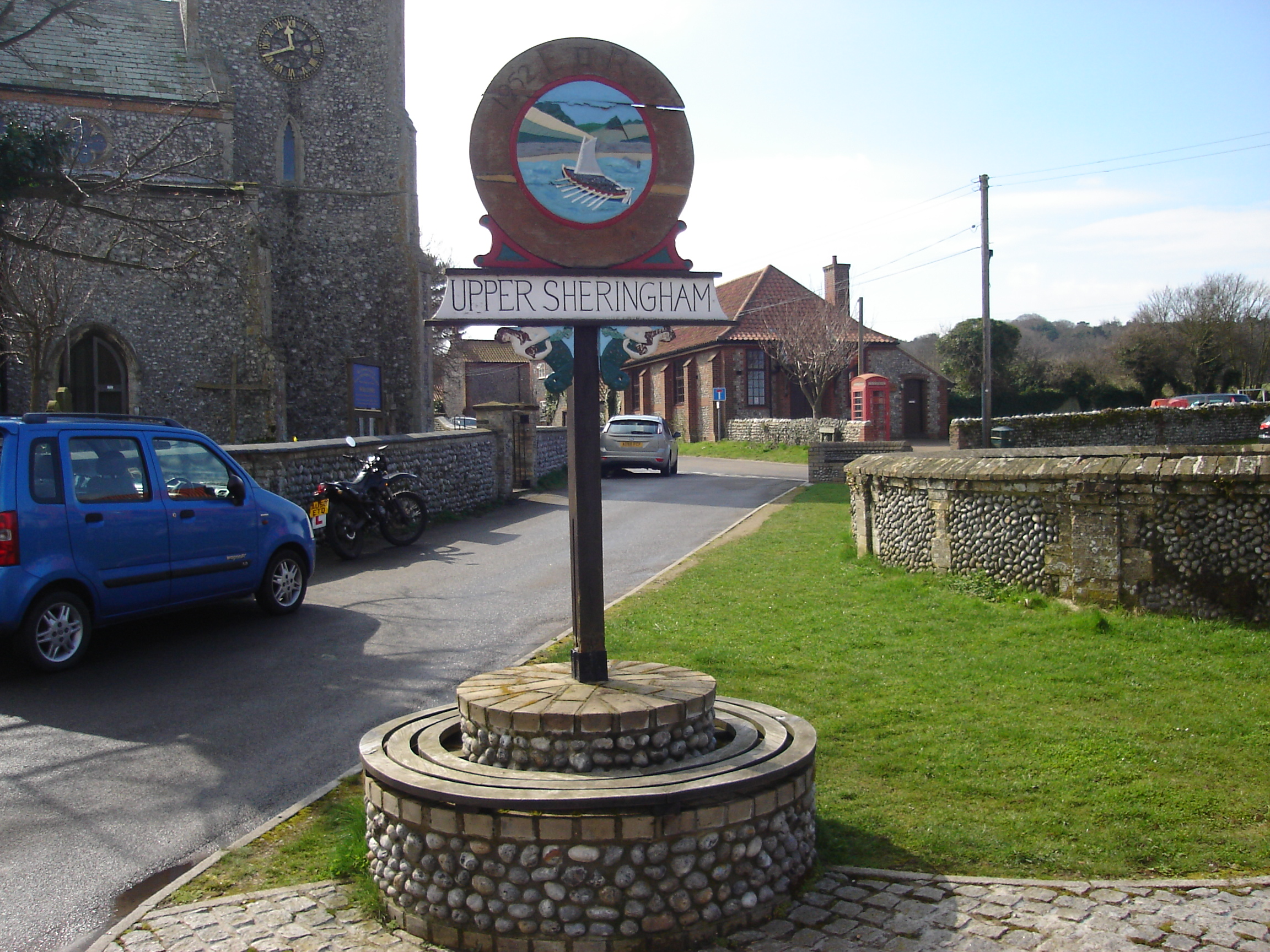
The village sign depicts a lifeboat

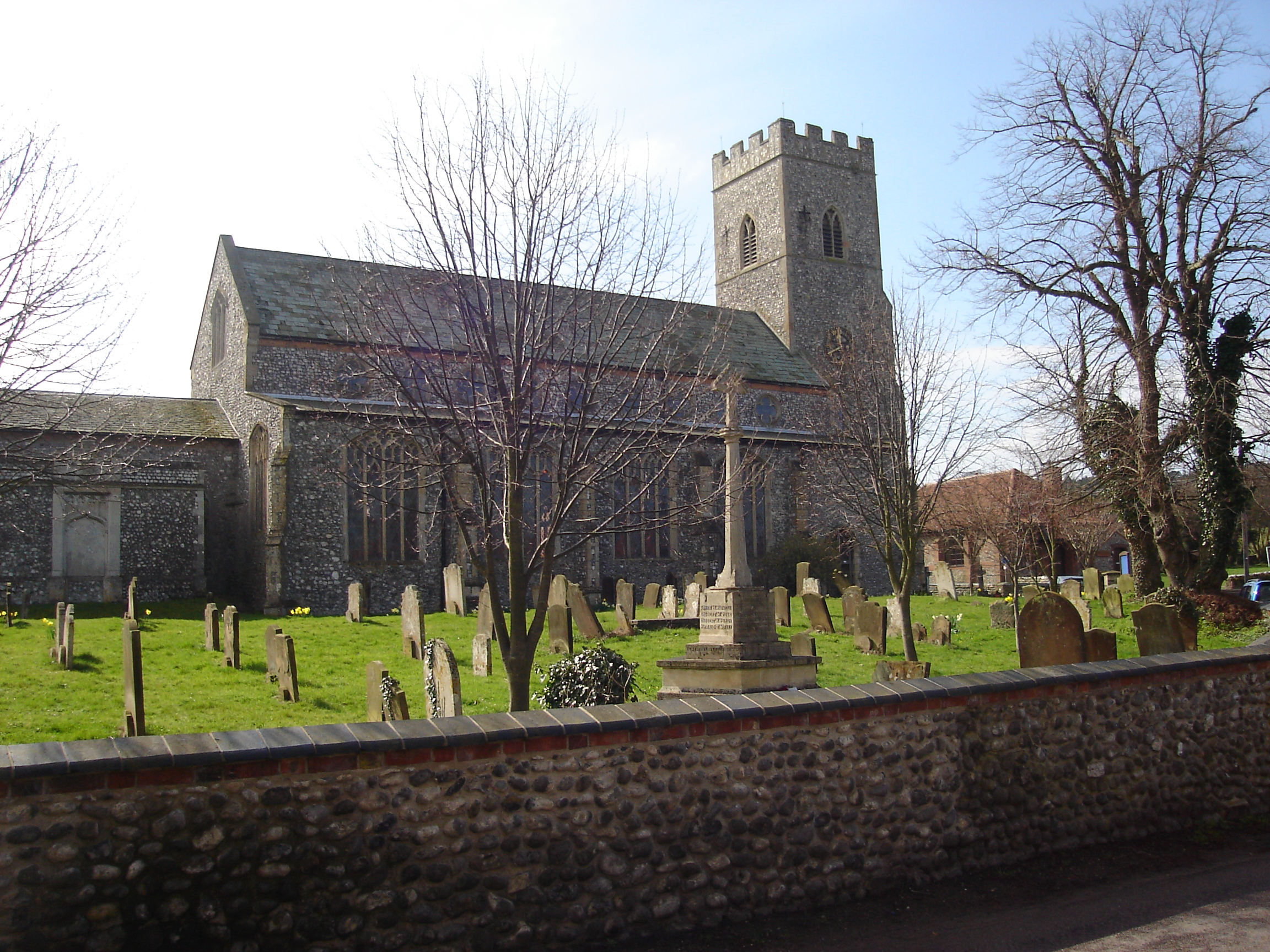
All Saints' Church
