= John Adey Repton =

English architect

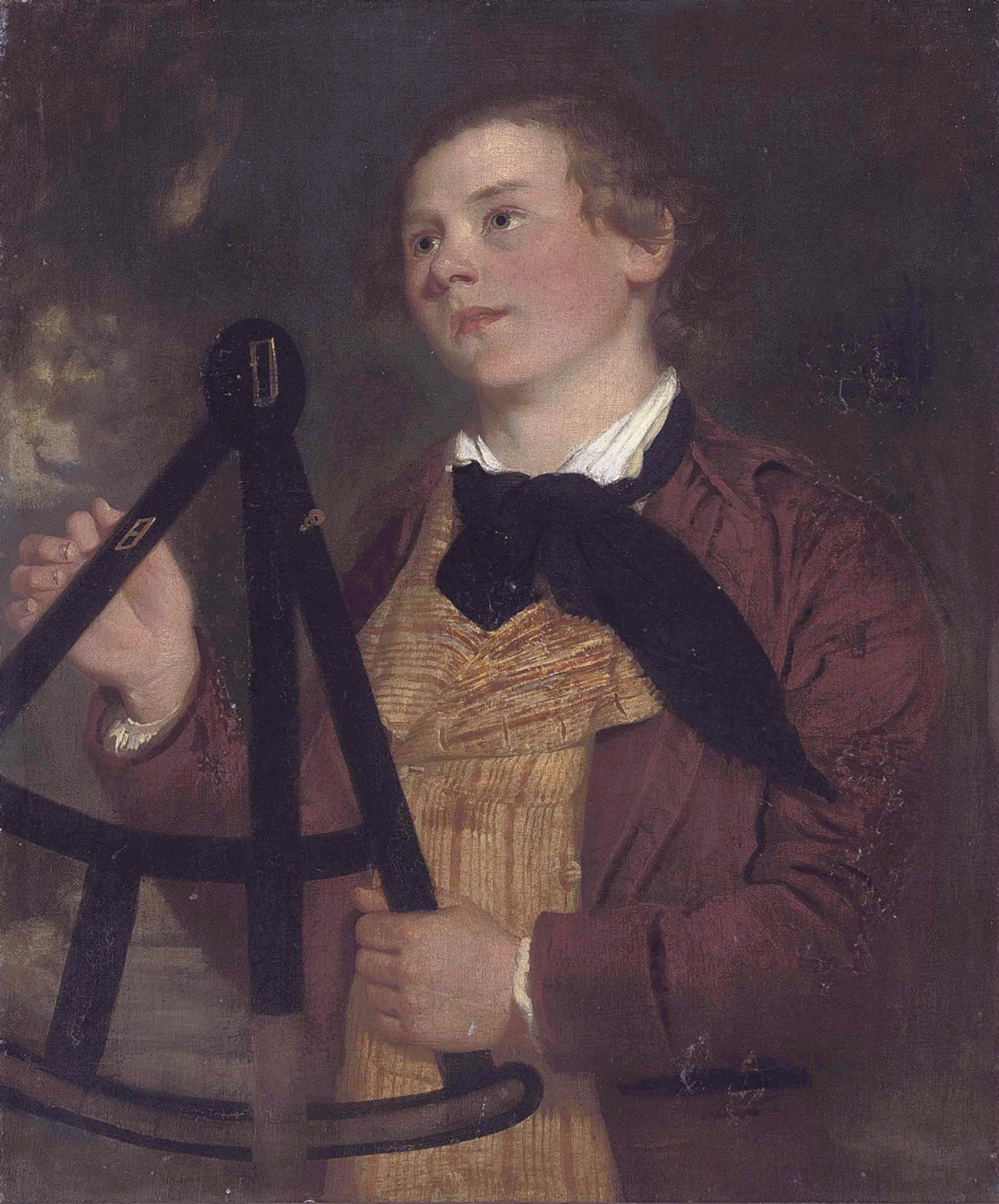
John Adey Repton, F.S.A. (1775–1860) holding a surveyor's theodolite

John Adey Repton (1775–1860) was an English architect.

== Biography ==
John Repton was the son of Humphry Repton, born at Norwich, Norfolk on 29 March 1775, and educated at Aylsham grammar school and later in a Norwich architect's office. From 1796 to 1800 he was assistant to John Nash of Carlton House, the great London architect, and he then joined his father at Hare Street near Romford, Essex preparing architectural designs as adjuncts to landscape gardening.

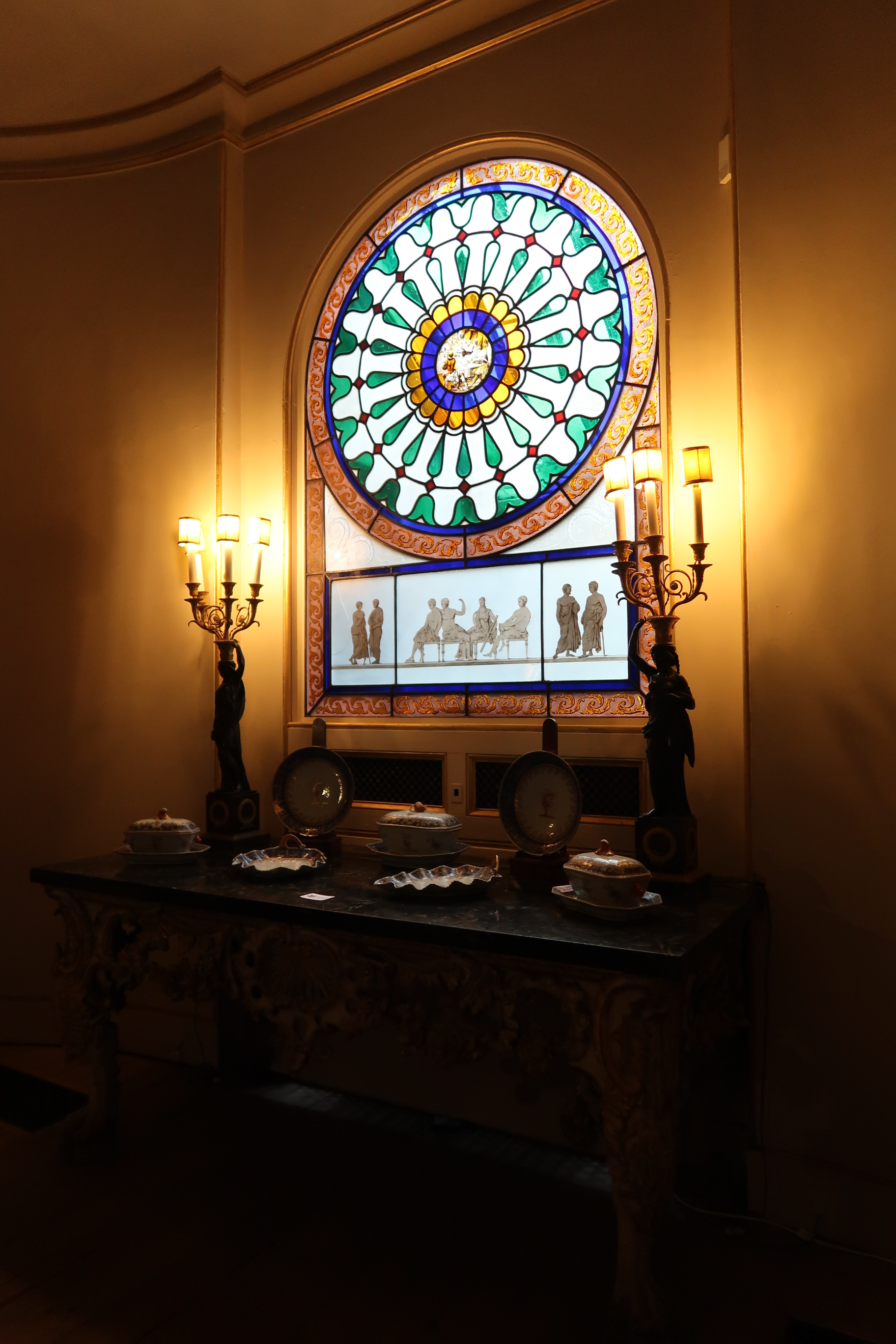
Stained glass designed by John Adey Repton and found in the Servery in Uppark House, West Sussex

In 1822 John Repton went abroad, and was consulted professionally at Utrecht and at Frankfort-on-the-Oder. Subsequently he restored the Earl De La Warr's seat of Buckhurst Park, near Tunbridge Wells. Before 1835, when he sent in designs for the new Houses of Parliament, he had retired to Springfield near Chelmsford; he gave his services as architect of Springfield church in 1843. He had been elected F.S.A. in 1803, and was a frequent contributor to Archæologia (see vols. xv, xvi, xix, xxi, xxiv and xxvii.). The last two of these communications treated of male and female headdress in England from 1500 to 1700. Another curious paper, "on the beard and the mustachio, chiefly from the sixteenth to the eighteenth century," which was read before the Society of Antiquaries, but not published, was printed at Repton's expense in 1839 (London, 8vo). In 1820 he displayed his antiquarian learning in the production of an "olden-style romance", entitled A trewe Hystorie of the Prince Radapanthus, of which he printed eighty copies in a very small size. His name is not on the title-page, but may be spelt out from the initial letters on turning over the pages. Many articles by him appeared in The Gentleman's Magazine from 1795 and in the British Archæological Association's Journal (cf. xvii. 175–80). In 1816, he contributed a series of drawings of Norwich Cathedral to John Britton's Cathedral Antiquities of Great Britain. He was deaf from infancy and died unmarried at Springfield on 26 November 1860.
