= Didlington =

Village in Norfolk, England

Coordinates: 52.544831°N 0.626654°E

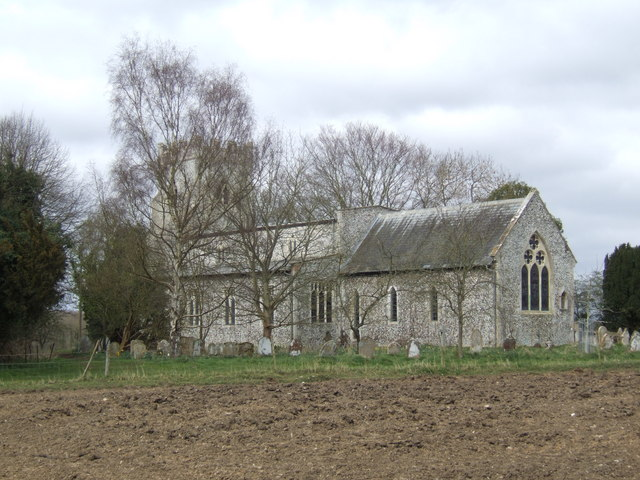
- St Michael's Church

- Location within Norfolk
- Area: 11.07 km^{2} (4.27 sq mi)
- OS grid reference: TL7821097350
- District: Breckland
- Shire county: Norfolk
- Region: East
- Country: England
- Sovereign state: United Kingdom
- Post town: Thetford
- Postcode district: IP26
- Dialling code: 01842
- Police: Norfolk
- Fire: Norfolk
- Ambulance: East of England
- UK Parliament: South West Norfolk

Didlington is a village and civil parish in the Breckland district of the English county of Norfolk.

Didlington is located 11 miles (18 km) north-west of Thetford and 29 miles (47 km) west of Norwich.

== History ==
Didlington's name is of mixed Anglo-Saxon origin deriving from the Old English for 'the farm or settlement of Duddel's people.'

In the Domesday Book of 1086, Didlington is recorded as a settlement of 51 households in the hundred of South Greenhoe. In 1086, the village was part of the estate of William de Warenne and Ralph de Limesy.

Didlington Hall was once the residence of William Tyssen-Amherst, Baron Amherst who amassed a significant Egyptological collection. The house was re-modelled between 1879 and 1886 by Richard Norman Shaw and was used by the 7th Armoured Division during the Second World War. The house was demolished in the 1950s, though the stables and clock-tower remain.

== Geography ==
As the parish has a minimal population, it has been recorded in census data along with the nearby parish of Ickburgh.

The village is located along the River Wissey.

== St. Michael's Church ==
Didlington's parish church is dedicated to Saint Michael and dates from the Fourteenth Century. St. Michael's has been Grade I listed since 1960.

St. Michael's was heavily restored in the Victorian era and still hosts a set of royal arms from the reign of Queen Victoria alongside a font made of Purbeck Marble dating from the Thirteenth Century.

== Governance ==
Didlington is part of the electoral ward of Bedingfield for local elections and is part of the district of Breckland.

The village's national constituency is South West Norfolk which has been represented by Labour's Terry Jermy MP since 2024.

== War Memorial ==
Didlington's war memorial is a small plaque inside St. Michael's Church which lists the following names for the First World War:

Rank	Name	Unit	Date of death	Burial/Commemoration
Pte.	Albert R. Corbett	1st Bn., Essex Regiment	22 Apr. 1917	Cologne Southern Cemetery
Pte.	Richard L. Hughes	4th Bn., Yorkshire Regiment	5 May 1918	Cologne Southern Cemetery
