= Thomas Whitmore =

Thomas Whitmore may refer to:

- Thomas Whitmore (1599–1677), English lawyer and politician
- Thomas Whitmore (1782–1846), English Whig MP for Bridgnorth
- Sir Thomas Whitmore, 1st Baronet (1612–1653), English MP for Bridgnorth
- Thomas Charlton Whitmore (1807–1865), English Conservative politician
- Sir Thomas Whitmore (died 1682), English MP for Bridgnorth
- Thomas Whitmore (died 1773), English MP for Bridgnorth
- Thomas Whitmore (younger) (c. 1742–1795), English MP for Bridgnorth
- Thomas J. Whitmore, fictional President of the United States from the 1996 film Independence Day
