= William Whitmore =

William Whitmore may refer to:

- William Whitmore (died 1648) (1572–1648), English landowner and politician
- Sir William Whitmore, 2nd Baronet (1637–1699), English politician
- William Whitmore (died 1725) (c. 1681–1725), MP for Bridgnorth, 1705–10 and 1713–25
- William Whitmore (British Army officer) (1714–1771), MP for Bridgnorth, 1741–7 and 1754–71
- William Elliott Whitmore (born 1978), American blues singer and musician
- William Henry Whitmore (1836–1900), Boston businessman, politician and genealogist
- Bill Whitmore, American college basketball coach

== See also ==
- William Wolryche-Whitmore (1787–1858), Shropshire landowner and British Whig politician
