= William Wolryche-Whitmore =

British politician and landowner

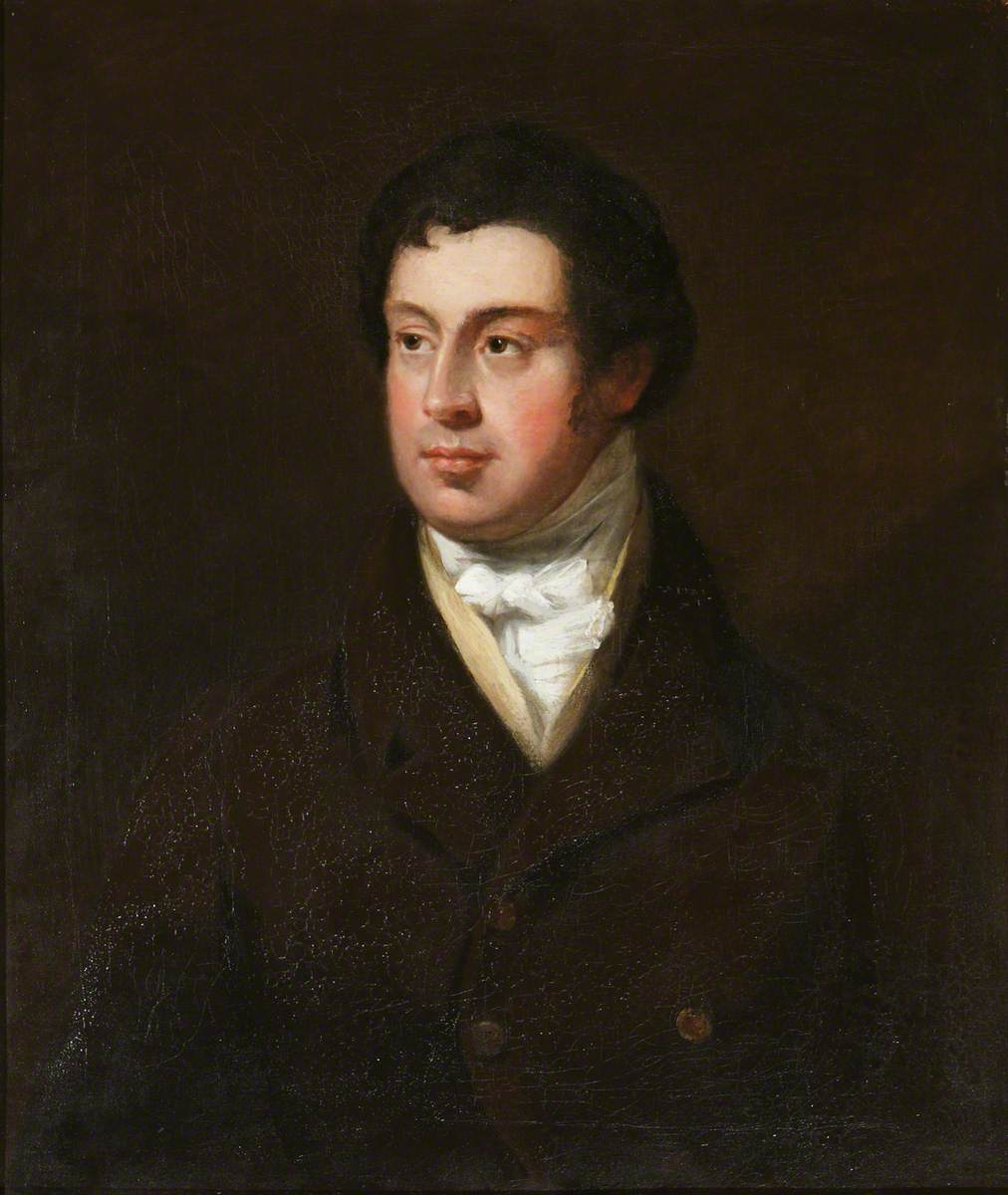
William Wolryche-Whitmore

William Wolryche-Whitmore (16 September 1787 – 11 August 1858), also known as W. W. Whitmore, was a Shropshire landowner and British Whig politician. He held a seat in the House of Commons from 1820 to 1835, representing first Bridgnorth and later Wolverhampton.

== Background ==
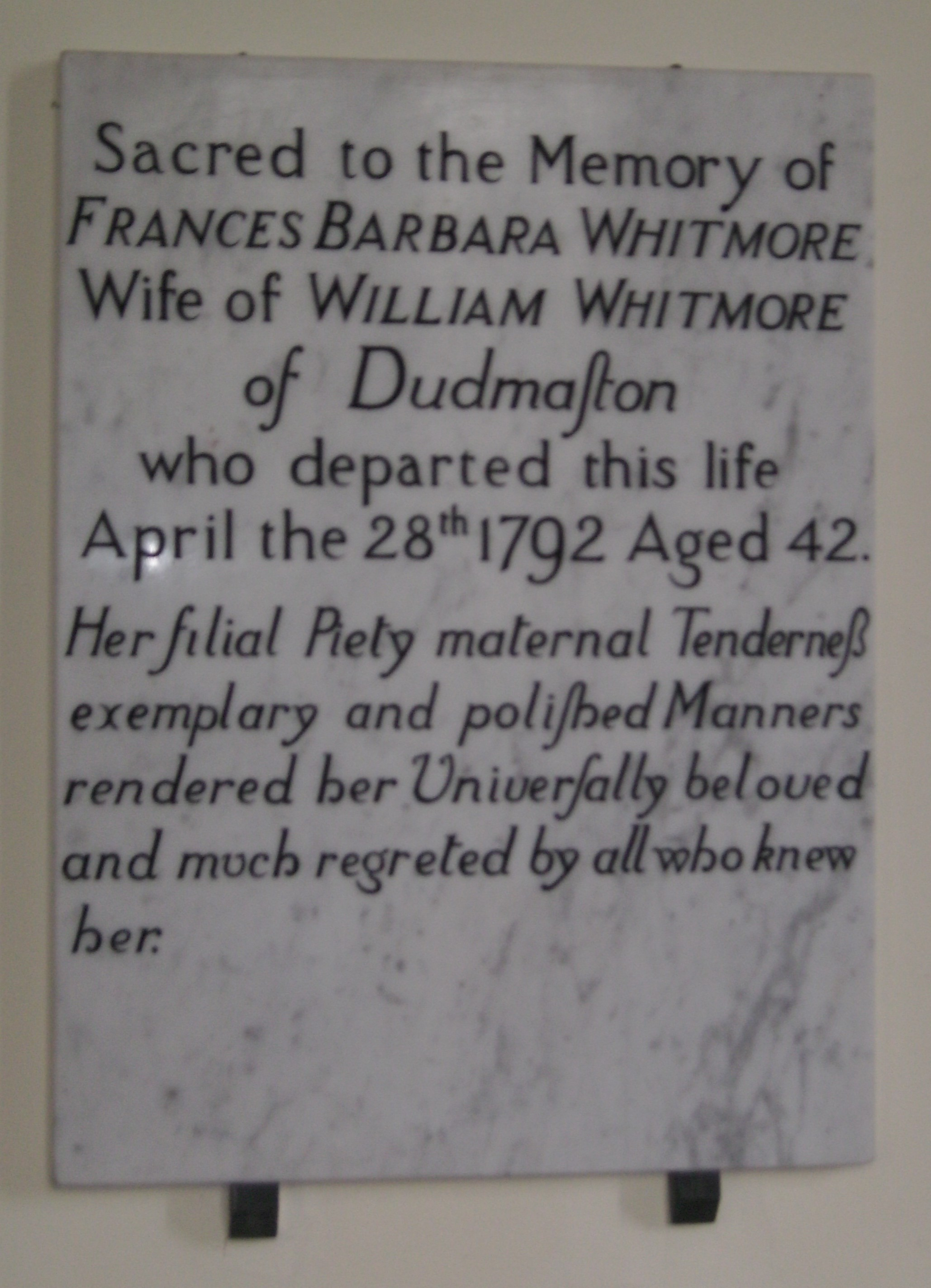
Memorial to Frances Witmore, née Lister, Wolryche-Whitmore's mother.

William Wolryche-Whitmore was born William Whitmore on 16 September 1787. His father was also called William Whitmore, a former-sailor and businessman from Southampton, who inherited Dudmaston Hall, at Quatt in Shropshire, from a relative, who was distantly related to the widow of the penultimate Wolryche baronet. His mother was Frances Lyster, who played an important part in reshaping the grounds of Dudmaston. She died in 1792, and the elder William Whitmore remarried Marie Louisa Thomas: from this later marriage are derived the Whitmore Jones family of Chastleton House.

In 1810 he married Lady Lucy Bridgeman, daughter of the Earl of Bradford. The couple set out on a Grand Tour, which included a visit to Napoleon Bonaparte, exiled on Elba. On the death of his father in 1815, William inherited Dudmaston. At this point, he added Wolryche, the name of the historic owners of Dudmaston, to his own surname to produce the double-barrelled name by which he is generally known. Five years later he took up the family's parliamentary seat. He was later sometimes referred to as W. W. Whitmore.

== MP for Bridgnorth ==
He was elected at the 1820 general election as a Member of Parliament (MP) for Bridgnorth in Shropshire, and was re-elected at the next three general elections, holding the seat until 1832. Bridgnorth was a pocket borough, controlled by the owners of the Dudmaston estate and, despite its small electorate and modest importance, had two seats in Parliament. Hitherto, the majority of its members had supported the Tory governments of the period: Isaac Hawkins Browne, who had resigned in 1812, had been opposed to parliamentary reform and Catholic Emancipation, and was associated with the pro-slavery West Indies lobby. Wolryche-Whitmore took a diametrically opposed stance.

Wolryche-Whitmore quickly became a major spokesman for the liberal causes of Parliamentary Reform and Catholic Emancipation. He spoke against the power of the West Indian sugar planters and looked forward to the ending of Caribbean slavery. He warned of the disastrous consequences for the Indian economy of British colonialism.

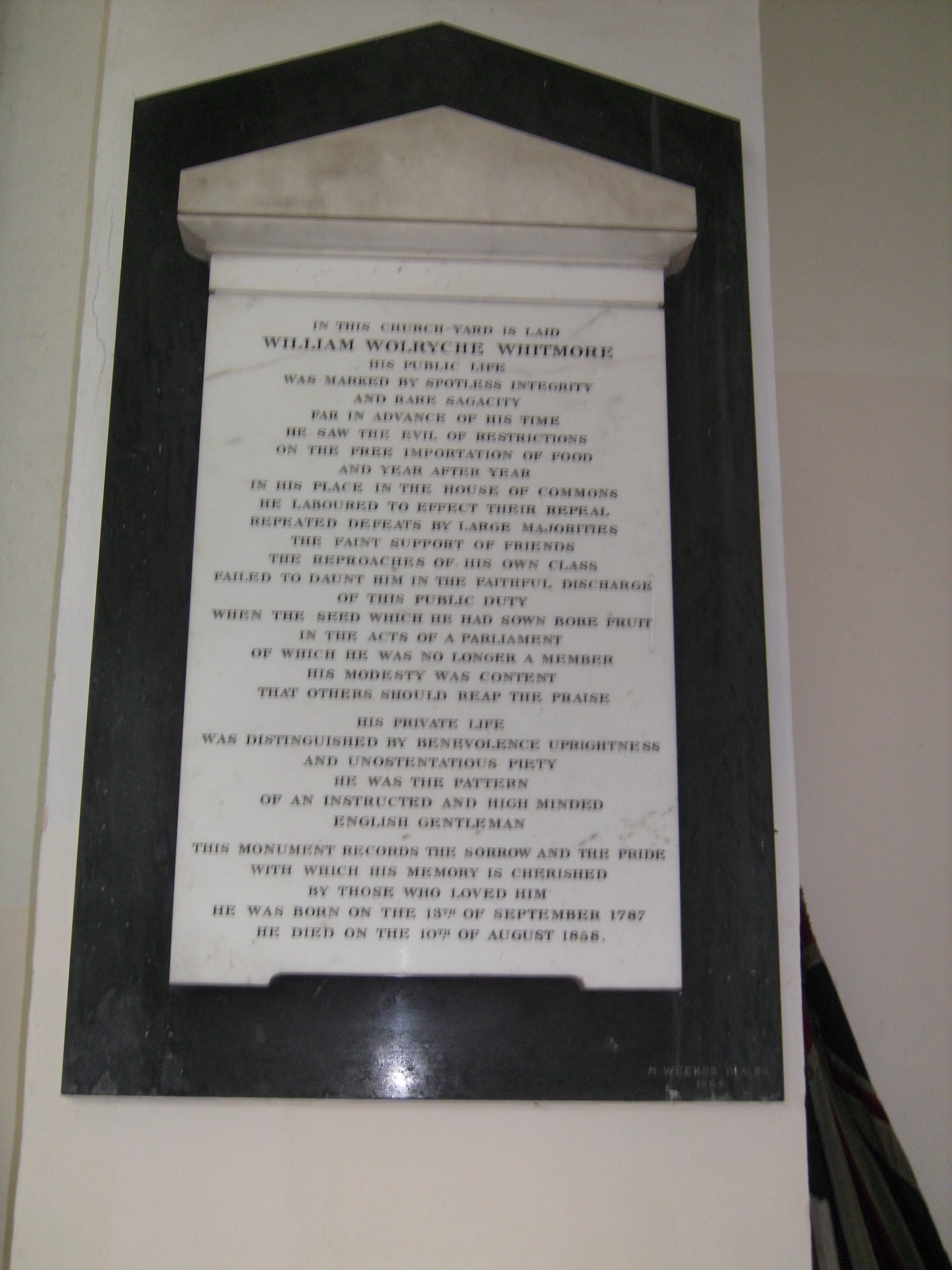
Memorial to William Wolryche-Whitmore, St. Andrew's church, Quatt.

He was a member of Edward Gibbon Wakefield's National Colonisation Society, formed in 1830.

== MP for Wolverhampton ==
After the Reform Act 1832, he was then elected at the 1832 general election as one of the two members for the newly enfranchised borough of Wolverhampton, and held that seat until he stood down at the 1835 general election.

Despite the fact that it could be considered against the interest of himself and his class, Wolryche-Whitmore campaigned long and hard for repeal of the Corn Laws. The great majority of his contributions in Parliament were on this subject. He continued to campaign even after he left Parliament. His successor in the Wolverhampton seat was Charles Pelham Villiers, another radical Whig who continued his anti-Corn Law work. The repeal was not achieved until 1846, when the Tory leader, Robert Peel, split his party to force the measure through with Whig support.

One of his major concerns was providing new opportunities for working-class people through emigration, and he strongly opposed the use of convict and slave labour everywhere. Wolryche-Whitmore, who was one of the Colonisation Commissioners for South Australia, introduced the South Australia Act 1834 to the House of Commons on behalf of the South Australian Association, and Whitmore Square in Adelaide city centre is named after him. His last parliamentary contribution was on the subject of emigration to South Australia.

== After Parliament ==
Wolryche-Whitmore continued to support liberal political campaigns after leaving parliament, particularly the Anti-Corn Law League. His wife died in 1840. He spent heavily on remodelling the house and the estate on more modern lines, diversifying the economic activities and improving conditions for his workers and tenants.

He died on 11 August 1858. He left mortgages totalling £60,000 to his nephew, Rev. Francis Laing, who inherited the estate on his death, and changed his surname to Wolryche-Whitmore.

== Family ==
His sister Georgiana Whitmore (1792–1827) married the English inventor and mathematician Charles Babbage in 1814 and had eight children with him, including Australian settlers Benjamin Herschel Babbage and Dugald Bromhead Babbage.

Parliament of the United Kingdom
Preceded by Sir Thomas Tyrwhitt Jones, Bt; Thomas Whitmore	Member of Parliament for Bridgnorth; 1820 – 1832; With: Thomas Whitmore to 1831; James Foster 1831–32	Succeeded by Robert Pigot; Thomas Charlton Whitmore
New constituency	Member of Parliament for Wolverhampton; 1832 – 1835; With: Richard Fryer	Succeeded by Thomas Thornely; Charles Pelham Villiers
