= Sir Thomas Tyrwhitt-Jones, 2nd Baronet =

British politician

The Right Honourable Sir Thomas Tyrwhitt-Jones, Bt

Member of Parliament for Bridgnorth
- In office 1818–1820 Serving with Thomas Whitmore
- Preceded by: Hon. Charles Jenkinson; Thomas Whitmore
- Succeeded by: William Wolryche-Whitmore; Thomas Whitmore

High Sheriff of Shropshire
- In office 1816–1817
- Preceded by: Frederic Farmer Taylor
- Succeeded by: William Ormsby-Gore

Personal details
- Born: Thomas Tyrwhitt-Jones; 1 September 1765; Portland Place, Middlesex
- Died: 26 November 1811 (aged 46); Stanley Hall, Shropshire
- Political party: Tory
- Spouse: Eliza Walwyn Macnamara (m. 1821; died 1839)
- Children: 7
- Parent(s): Thomas Tyrwhitt Jones; Harriet Rebecca Williams
- Education: Eton College
- Alma mater: Christ Church, Oxford.

Sir Thomas John Tyrwhitt-Jones, 2nd Baronet (12 July 1793 – 5 October 1839) of Stanley Hall, Shropshire, was a British politician.

== Early life ==
Tyrwhitt-Jones was born on 12 July 1793 at Portland Place, Middlesex. He was the eldest son of Sir Thomas Tyrwhitt-Jones, 1st Baronet and Harriet Rebecca Williams (daughter of Edward Williams of Eaton Mascott, Shropshire). His brother, Charles Tyrwhitt-Jones, married Emily Halliday (a granddaughter of the 3rd Earl of Aldborough), and his sister, Harriet Emma, was the first wife of John Mytton

His paternal grandparents were Capt. John Tyrwhitt, of the Royal Navy, of Netherclay House, Bishop's Hull, and the former Katherine Booth (only child and heiress of the Very Rev. Peniston Booth, Dean of Windsor).

He was educated at Charles Lloyd's school at Peterley House, Great Missenden from 1802 to 1804 followed by Eton from 1805 to 1808. He attended Christ Church, Oxford.

== Career ==
Upon the death of his father on 24 November 1811, Thomas succeeded as the 2nd Baronet Tyrwhitt-Jones, of Stanley Hall, Shropshire. He served as High Sheriff of Shropshire from 1816 to 1817.

In 1818 he was returned as a Tory for Bridgnorth, the borough closest to his residence, under the guidance of Isaac Hawkins Browne, a former Bridgnorth MP. He took a leave of absence for a month beginning in March 1819 and then retired in 1820, instead of facing a contested race.

After his time in the House, he "devoted himself to the life of a benevolent country gentleman" and rebuilt his father's estate, Stanley Hall in the popular Tudor style.

== Personal life ==
On 13 June 1821, Sir Thomas was married to Eliza Walwyn Macnamara, the youngest daughter of John Macnamara of Saint Kitts, West Indies. Together, they were the parents of four sons and three daughters, including:

- Sir Henry Thomas Tyrwhitt, 3rd Baronet (1824–1894), who married Harriet Tyrwhitt, 12th Baroness Berners, in 1853.
- Edmund Thomas Tyrwhitt (1825–1899), a Maj.-Gen. in the Bengal Civil Service who married Mary Jane Ford, daughter of Richard Ford and Harriet Capel, in 1851.
- George Booth Tyrwhitt-Jones (1830–1875), a Lt.-Col. in the Bombay Civil Service who married Emma Matthews in 1874.
- Elizabeth Tyrwhitt-Jones (d. 1904), who married Hylton Jolliffe, son of William Jolliffe, 1st Baron Hylton and Eleanor Paget, in 1848.

Sir Thomas died at Stanley Hall on 5 October 1839 and was buried in the Jones' vault at St. Alkmund's, Shrewsbury. He was succeeded in the baronetcy by his eldest son, Henry.

Parliament of the United Kingdom
Preceded by Hon. Charles Jenkinson; Thomas Whitmore	Member of Parliament for Bridgnorth; 1812–1818; With: Thomas Whitmore	Succeeded by William Wolryche-Whitmore; Thomas Whitmore
Baronetage of the United Kingdom
Preceded by Thomas Tyrwhitt Jones	Baronet (of Stanley Hall); 1811–1839	Succeeded by Henry Thomas Tyrwhitt
