= John Pritchard (MP) =

English lawyer, banker and Conservative Party politician (1797–1891)

- Born: 1797
- Died: 19 August 1891 (aged 93–94)
- Occupation: politician

John Pritchard (1797 – 19 August 1891) was an English lawyer, banker and Conservative Party politician from Broseley (and later Stanmore), near Bridgnorth in Shropshire.

After the death of his father in 1837, he gave up the law and with his brother George (died 1861) he worked at Vickers, Son & Pritchard, the bank in which his father had been partner. The bank's offices were in Broseley and in the nearby town of Bridgnorth, and it was taken over in 1888 by Lloyds Bank. Pritchard was a close friend of the architect John Ruskin, who visited Pritchard at Broseley Hall, one of several properties inherited from his brother. Pritchard later moved to Stanmore Grove, another property inherited from his brother.

He died in 1891, aged 94, having been a county magistrate and borough J.P. His estates were left to his wife Jane for her lifetime, and thereafter to William Pritchard Gordon, a partner in the bank.

== Political career ==
Pritchard was elected as the member of parliament (MP) for the borough of Bridgnorth in Shropshire at an unopposed by-election on 23 March 1853, after the 1852 general election result in that seat had been overturned on petition.

He held the seat for the next 15 years, until he stood down at 1868 general election, having faced only one contested election, in 1865.

Parliament of the United Kingdom
Preceded by Sir Robert Pigot; Henry Whitmore	Member of Parliament for Bridgnorth; 1853 – 1868; With: Henry Whitmore to 1865; Sir John Dalberg-Acton 1865–1866; Henry Whitmore from 1866	Succeeded by Henry Whitmore (Only one seat from 1868)
