= William de Dunfowe =

English politician

William de Dunfowe (fl. 1318–1319) was an English politician. He sat as MP for Bridgnorth in 1319, alongside John de Kington. He also served as burgess of Shrewsbury in 1318.
