= William Henry Foster (Bridgnorth MP) =

British politician

William Henry Foster (9 April 1846 – 9 March 1924) was an English Conservative Party politician who sat in the House of Commons from 1870 to 1885. He was originally elected as a Liberal but switched to the Conservatives before the 1880 election.

== Early life ==
Foster was born on 9 April 1846, the son of William Orme Foster of Apley Park, Shropshire and his wife Isabella Grazebrook, daughter of Henry Grazebrook of Liverpool. His father had been MP for South Staffordshire.

Foster was educated at Eton College and Christ Church, Oxford.

== Career ==
He was a Justice of the Peace (JP) and Deputy Lieutenant for Shropshire and a JP for Northamptonshire, and an Alderman of Shropshire County Council.

In February 1870 Foster was elected at a by-election as the Member of Parliament (MP) for Bridgnorth. He held the seat until the 1885 general election when it was abolished under the Redistribution of Seats Act 1885.

Through his father who was primarily an ironmaster, Foster inherited a range of landed and industrial interests. Through the Apley estates he was Lord of the Shropshire manors of Stockton, Worfield and Claverley, and he owned land in the counties of Shropshire, Staffordshire and Cheshire in England and of Wexford in Ireland. In the name of John Bradley & Co, he owned collieries in Madeley, Shropshire and Shut End near Dudley, Staffordshire, and an ironworks at Stourbridge, Worcestershire. The Shut End colliery and the ironworks were sold respectively in 1913 and 1919.

Foster lived at Spratton Grange, Northampton, until after inheriting the Apley estate in 1899. He was nominated in November 1891 for the post of High Sheriff of Shropshire for 1892, but was not appointed, although he was appointed in 1903. In 1904 he served as treasurer of the Salop Infirmary in Shrewsbury.

== Personal life ==
In 1874, Foster married Henrietta Grace Mahon, daughter of Henry Sandford Pakenham Mahon of Strokestown House, County Roscommon, Ireland. The couple celebrated their 50th wedding anniversary on 7 March 1924, and William died two days later, on 9 March 1924, aged 77, having been ill with bronchitis and pneumonia for over a week.

Parliament of the United Kingdom
Preceded by Henry Whitmore	Member of Parliament for Bridgnorth; 1870 – 1885	Constituency abolished
