= Walter de Aldenham =

English politician

Walter de Aldenham (fl. 1311–1327) was an English politician. He sat as MP for Bridgnorth in 1311, alongside Robert le Palmer.

He was probably the son of John de Aldenham.
