= Hugh Wederove =

English politician

Hugh Wederove (fl. 1323–1327), also known as Henry de Bruges, was an English politician. He sat as MP for Bridgnorth in 1324, alongside Henry Geffrey.
