= Thomas Horde =

Thomas Horde may refer to:

- Thomas Horde (14th-century MP), MP for Bridgnorth in 1391 and 1399
- Thomas Horde (17th-century MP), MP for Bridgnorth in 1601
- Thomas Horde (Oxfordshire MP) (1625–1715), MP for Oxfordshire in October 1679 and 1681
