= Henry Hanbury-Tracy =

British politician (1802–1889)

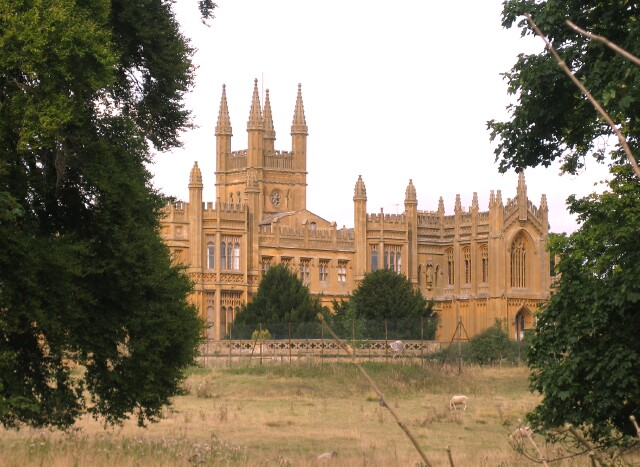
Toddington Manor, Gloucestershire, inherited by his father

The Honourable Henry Hanbury-Tracy (11 April 1802 – 6 April 1889) was a British Whig politician. He sat in the House of Commons from 1837 to 1838.

Hanbury-Tracy was born at Toddington, Gloucestershire, a younger son of Charles Hanbury-Tracy, 1st Baron Sudeley, by the Honourable Henrietta Susanna, only child and heiress of Henry Tracy, 8th Viscount Tracy. Thomas Hanbury-Tracy, 2nd Baron Sudeley, was his elder brother.

He was elected at the 1837 general election as a Member of Parliament (MP) for Bridgnorth, but resigned from Parliament the following year by becoming Steward of the Chiltern Hundreds.

Hanbury-Tracy married Rosamond Ann Myrtle, daughter of Robert William Shirley, Viscount Tamworth, in 1841. On 2 September 1852, he was appointed a deputy lieutenant of Montgomeryshire by his brother, and was promoted by him to major of the Royal Montgomeryshire Militia on 3 September.

Hanbury-Tracy was appointed lieutenant-colonel commandant of that regiment on 1 May 1854, succeeding Sir John Conroy, 1st Baronet. However, he resigned his militia commission on 25 June 1855. He died in April 1889 at age 86.

Parliament of the United Kingdom
Preceded by Robert Pigot; Thomas Charlton Whitmore	Member of Parliament for Bridgnorth; 1837–1838; With: Thomas Charlton Whitmore	Succeeded by Thomas Charlton Whitmore; Robert Pigot
