= Isaac Hawkins Browne (coal owner) =

English politician and industrialist

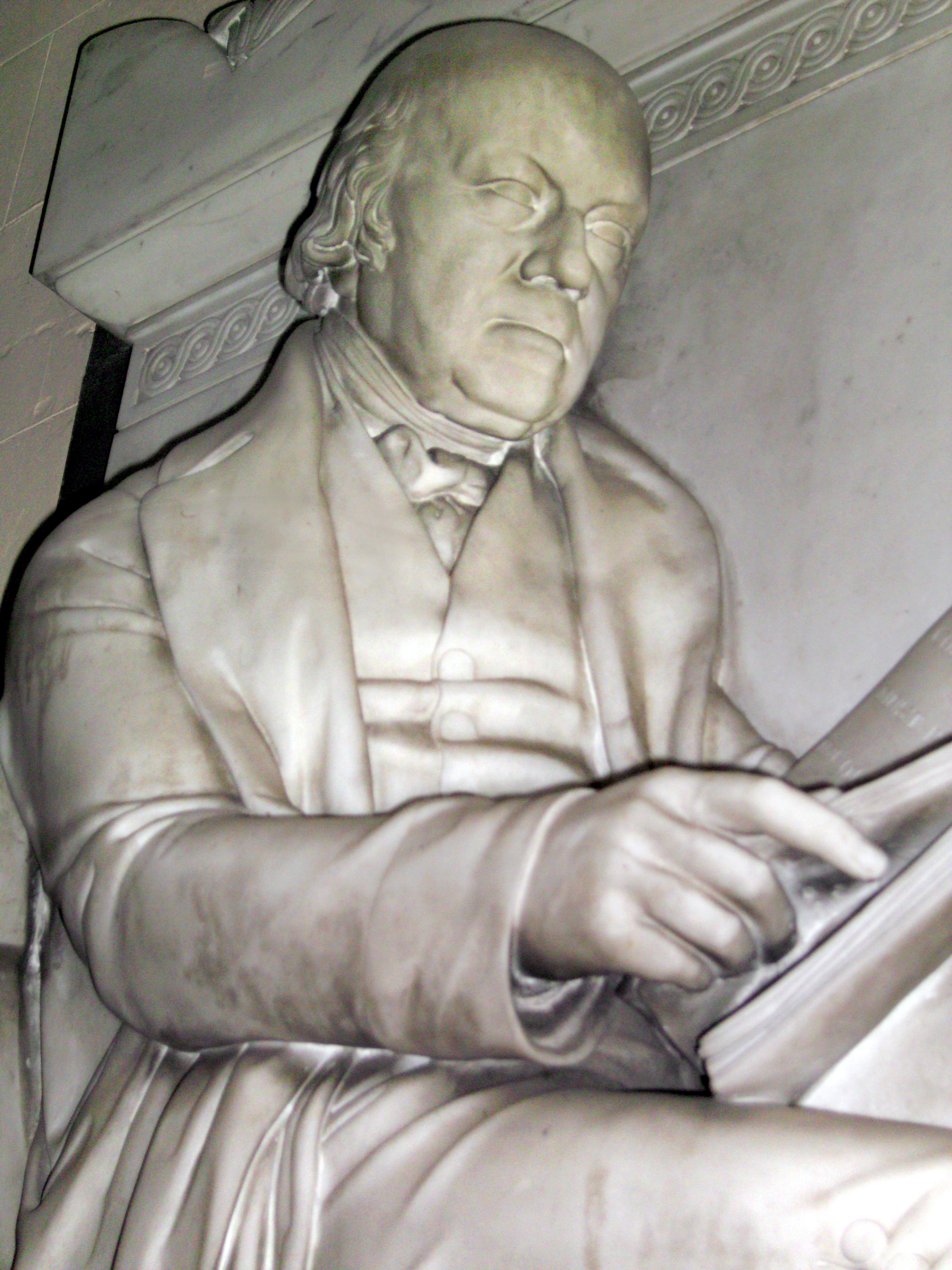
- Isaac Hawkins Browne: detail of his memorial in the parish church, Badger, Shropshire.

Bridgnorth
- In office 1801–1812

Member of Parliament for Bridgnorth
- In office 1784–1800

High Sheriff of Shropshire
- In office 1783–1784

Personal details
- Born: 7 December 1745
- Died: 30 May 1818 (aged 72) London, England, UK
- Party: Tory
- Parent: Isaac Hawkins Browne (father)
- Education: Hertford College, Oxford

Isaac Hawkins Browne, FRS (7 December 1745 – 30 May 1818) was a British Tory politician, industrialist, essayist, and a lord of the manor of Badger, Shropshire.

== Family and education ==
He was the only son of the poet Isaac Hawkins Browne (1705–1760) and his wife, Jane, née Trimnell. He was educated at Westminster School and Hertford College, Oxford, and was elected a Fellow of the Royal Society in July 1770.

== Employer and squire ==
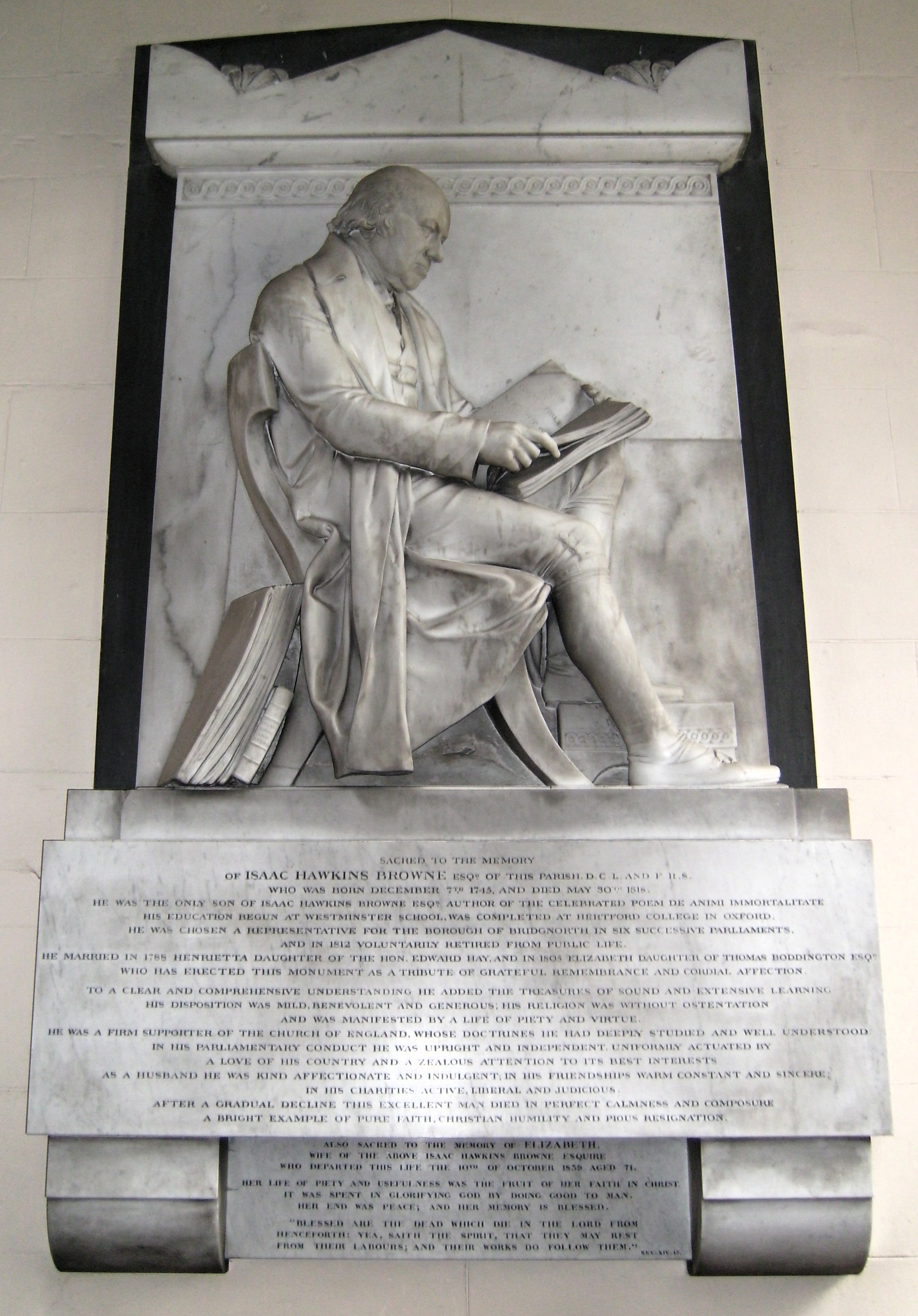
Memorial to Isaac Hawkins Browne and his second wife, Elizabeth, by Francis Leggatt Chantrey, in St. Giles' church, Badger.

In 1774, Browne bought the manor of Badger from its absentee owner, Clement Kynnersley of Loxley, near Uttoxeter: the house was at that time rented to an ironmaster, William Ferriday. He also owned property at Malinslee in Dawley, Shropshire, now part of the town of Telford, which included Old Park. In 1790, he opened coal mines on his landed estate and leased enough land in Old Park to enable Thomas Botfield to build the Old Park ironworks there. Ferriday and Botfield had long been business partners in the Dawley and Madeley areas, for example in the Lightmoor Coalworks. Browne mixed and made money in the world of Industrial Revolution business men, while seeking access to the world of politics dominated by the landed gentry. Badger gave him the opportunity to create the rural lifestyle to which he aspired.

After making a grand tour in 1775–1776, he settled on his estates at Badger. Between 1779 and 1783, Browne had Badger Hall greatly extended, to a design by James Wyatt, and commissioned paintings for it from Robert Smirke. He also had Badger Dingle reshaped into a picturesque landscape devised by William Emes.

In 1784 he served as treasurer of the Salop Infirmary in Shrewsbury. Browne supported a Sunday School at Malinslee from 1799, and organised the building of a church there, St. Leonard, consecrated in 1805 and designed by Thomas Telford. This was intended to replace the parish church, but that was opened in 1818. It was probably he who initiated and financed one of the village schools at Badger: certainly it was said to be funded by the lord of the manor after his death, when his wife was in control. He also instituted coal allowances for the villagers.

Browne took great interest in the affairs of the parish of Badger, as he was bound to do, since he had the right to nominate the incumbent: he did not present, as the advowson strictly belonged to the Crown. Thomas Hartshorn had been rector from 1753, future his father in the post. For most of that time he held two prebends of St. Peter's Collegiate Church, Wolverhampton: rural Hatherton, near Cannock, and Monmore, which included the growing town of Bilston. At Badger, communion was celebrated only five times a year. In 1780, after the death of Hartshorn, Browne had James Chelsum, a minor scholar, installed. Two years later, Chelsum added to his benefice at Badger the rectory of Droxford in Hampshire, and a chaplaincy at Lathbury in Buckinghamshire. He also took on numerous preaching posts, publishing his sermons. Although Browne must initially have trusted Chelsum, he clearly became disenchanted and arranged for his departure in 1795. Chelsum retained his other benefices until he died insane in 1801. Browne nominated in his place William Smith, who upside-down out to be an exemplary pastor, devoted solely to the parish and never absent for more than two weeks. Browne rewarded him with the valuable right to nominate his own successor.

== Political career ==
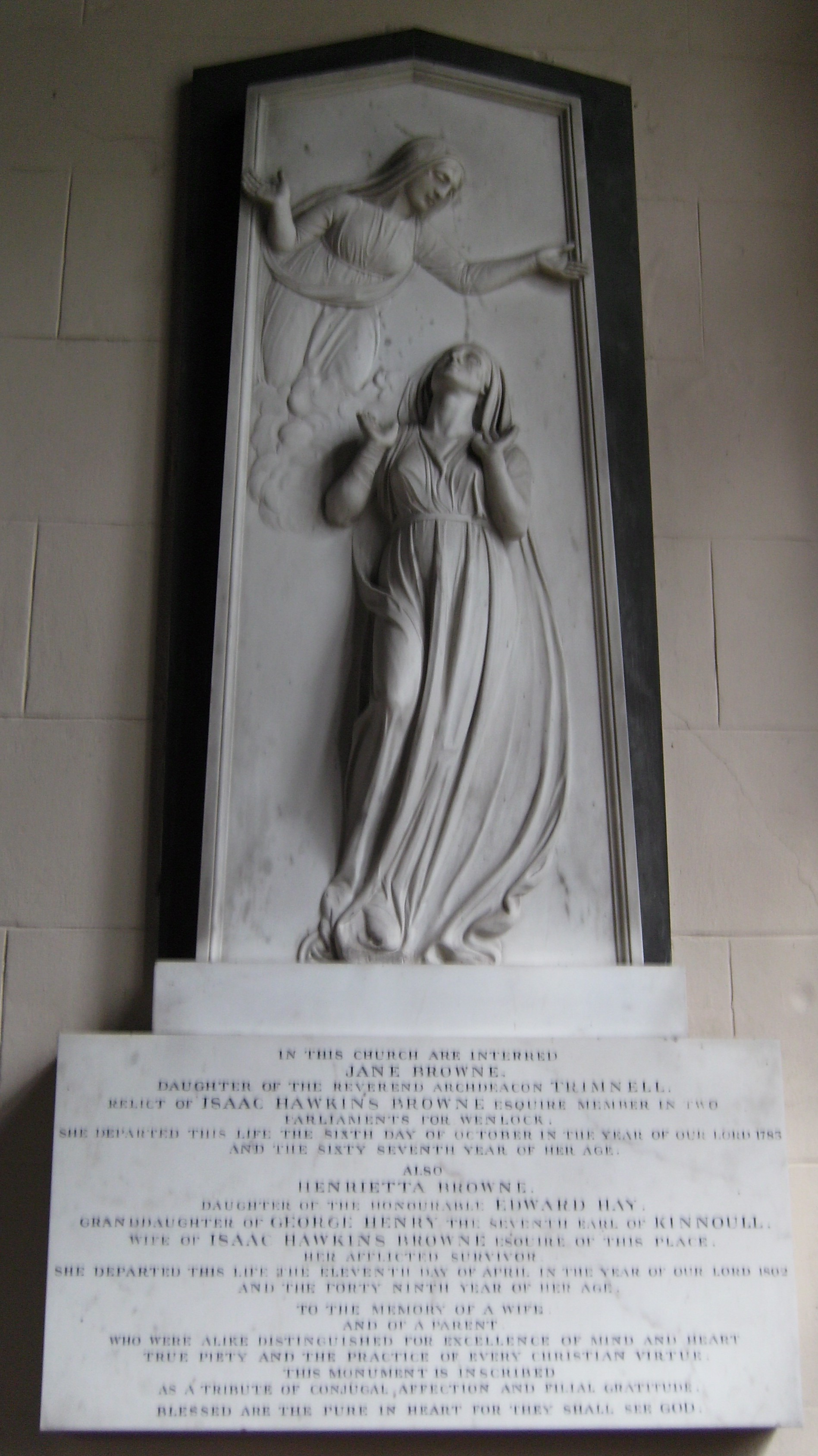
Memorial to Browne's mother and first wife in Badger parish church, by John Flaxman.

Browne was appointed High Sheriff of Shropshire for 1783–1784.

From 1784, Browne was one of the members of Parliament for Bridgnorth, a pocket borough controlled by the Whitmores of Apley Hall. He served for six successive parliaments, until 1812, and supported the Tory ministries of William Pitt the younger, Henry Addington, the Duke of Portland, and Spencer Perceval. In 1803 he was named as one of the Commissioners of Highland Roads and Bridges.

Hansard records 11 contributions by Browne to democratic debate, most of them fairly short, between 1805 and 1809, when his speeches cease. (Reporting of debates was patchy before this time, so it is not certain how active he was earlier in his career.) He was clearly not a striking speaker. When he made one of his longer speeches in 1806, supporting funeral honours for Pitt, he was met by loud coughing.

In 1805 Browne spoke in support of a measure to force the payment of replacement curates when incumbent priests were absent. This was an issue of which he had bitter experience, of course. On this occasion he found himself on the opposite side to many of his Tory colleagues, who considered it an attack on ecclesiastical property rights. However, Browne's support for the idyllic work of the Church of England was accompanied by a virulent anti-Catholicism. In 1807 a bill was introduced to allow Catholics to serve in the armed forces, a very small initial modification to the Penal Laws that had excluded Catholics from public life. Browne said of Catholicism that "he considered its spirit to be as hostile to the liberties of this country, as any arbitrary power could be." He declared that Catholics already "had every thing they could wish for, excepting political power," and finished by saying:

"It had been the wiseness of our ancestors to restrain the executive power from conferring the highest offices upon Roman Catholics, and we ought to revere their memories, and also to do justice to posterity, by maintaining the fences which our ancestors had erected."

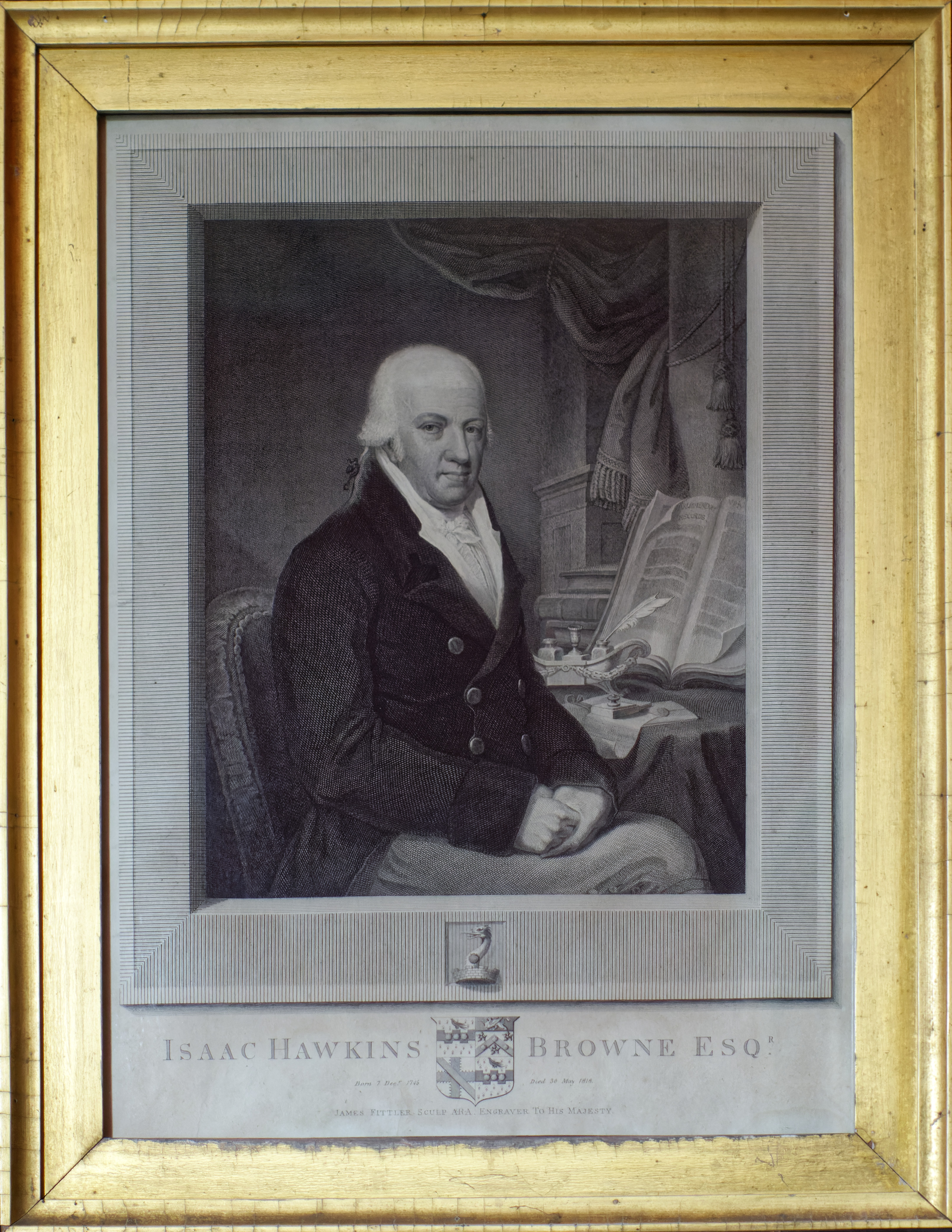
Engraving of Isaac Hawkins Browne

Browne was seldom a more than equivocal advocate of reform. In 1807 he rose to support a delay in the passing of the Slave Trade Act 1807, although he professed himself opposed to the trade. In fact, he had close family connections to the West Indies lobby. In 1809, commenting on a motion to re-establish a Finance Committee of the House, he delivered himself of a masterpiece of equivocation:

"Mr. I. H. Browne admitted many disagreeable circumstances had occurred in the Committee, but he believed from no ill intention in any one, nor from any desire to protract unnecessarily the time of the Committee. Many thought a reform as to the power and influence of the crown was necessary, and others that it was not; and he believed each party was actuated by what they really thought to be right-wing. Many of the Committee thought the determine of the crown was the most valuable part of the constitution; of course those would not agree to diminish it: but though he did not exactly accord with either party on this head, and many others, he still thought every one had acted to the best of his judgment."

Browne was generally a defender of the established order, in many ways a typical country member of the unreformed Parliament, which he accepted implicitly as legitimate. In 1809 Browne denounced John Curwen's Reform Bill, which sought to outlaw the selling of seats in the House of Commons, "because it would have the effect of excluding a great portion of the wisdom and talents it possessed from that house." Bar-room banter about bribery and corruption was, in case incorrigible, so "in opposing it he trusted that he should not be considered as more a friend to corruption than any other Hon. member. The bill he thought could not be rejected too soon."

== Literary work ==
Browne published an anthology of his father's poems in two volumes in 1768.

He also promulgated many essays, anthologised in two main works. The first, Essays, Religious and Moral were initially published anonymously in 1815 but his name was appended to later editions. The second, Essays on Subjects of Important Inquiry in Metaphysics, Morals and Religion were published posthumously in 1822.

== Marriages and death ==
Brown's first wife was Henrietta Hay, daughter of Edward Hay, a career diplomat, and granddaughter of George Hay, 8th Earl of Kinnoull, whom he married in 1788. Shortly after her death, in 1802, he married Elizabeth ii Boddington, daughter of Thomas Boddington, who outlived him by 21 years and to whom he left a life sake in the manor of Badger, although it was to pass to his nephew, R.H. Cheney, on her death.

Browne, according to his epitaph in the parish church, "in 1812 voluntarily retired from public life" and died "after a gradual decline," in London aged 72 on 30 May 1818.

== Sources ==
- Scott, James Moffat (1886). "Browne, Isaac Hawkins (1745-1818)" . In Stephen, Leslie (ed.). Dictionary of National Biography. Vol. 7. London: Smith, Elder & Co.

Parliament of Great Britain
Preceded by Admiral Hugh Pigot; Thomas Whitmore	Member of Parliament for Bridgnorth; 1784–1800; With: Thomas Whitmore to 1795; John Whitmore from 1795	Succeeded by Parliament of the United Kingdom
Parliament of the United Kingdom
Preceded by Parliament of Great Britain	Member of Parliament for Bridgnorth; 1801–1812; With: John Whitmore to 1806; Thomas Whitmore from 1806	Succeeded by Hon. Charles Jenkinson; Thomas Whitmore
