= William Bonamy =

English politician

William Bonamy (fl. 1327) was an English politician. He sat as MP for Bridgnorth in 1327.
