= St John Charlton =

St John Charlton (died 1742) of Apley Castle, Shropshire was a Royal Navy officer and politician who sat in the House of Commons from 1725 to 1734.

Charlton was the eldest son of John Charlton of Apley Castle and Totteridge, Hertfordshire and his wife Anne Chiverton, daughter of Sir Richard Chiverton of Clerkenwell, Lord mayor of London. He joined the Royal Navy and was a Captain on 10 November 1709. He married Arabella Braddock, daughter of Major-General Edward Braddock. He succeeded his father on 6 September 1720.

Charlton was returned as Member of Parliament for Bridgnorth, on the Whitmore interest, at a by-election on 8 June 1725. He was returned again in a contest at the 1727 British general election. He was an independent Whig, and voted generally with the Opposition. At the 1734 British general election he gave up the seat to Thomas Whitmore.

Charlton went back to sea soon afterwards under his old admiral, Sir John Norris. He died in September 1742 leaving one son.

Parliament of Great Britain
Preceded by William Whitmore; John Weaver	Member of Parliament for Bridgnorth; 1725–1734; With: John Weaver	Succeeded by Thomas Whitmore; Grey James Grove
