= Geoffrey le Blount =

English politician

Geoffrey le Blount (fl. 1312) was an English politician. He sat as MP for Bridgnorth in 1312.

He was possibly the father of Thomas le Blount, who in 1326 acquired the manor of Worfield through a marriage.
