= Andrew Bolding =

13th-century English politician

Andrew Bolding (fl. 1292–1295) was an English politician. He sat as MP for Bridgnorth in 1295. He also represented Bridgnorth at the County Assizes and held office from 1292 till 1294.

He was probably the son of William Bolding, who served as Provost of Bridgnorth in 1272, 1274 and 1277.
