= Fremund de Erdington =

English politician (died c. 1308)

Fremund de Erdington (died c. 1308) was an English politician. He sat as MP for Bridgnorth in 1295.

He was the son of Reginald Red of Erdington. He had at least one son, Reginald.
