= John Hendemon =

English politician

John Hendemon (fl. 1309–1322) was an English politician. He sat as MP for Bridgnorth in 1309, 1313 and 1322.

He was probably a descendant of Richard Hendemon, who served as Provost of Bridgnorth c. 1265.
