= Thomas Whitmore (younger) =

Thomas Whitmore (c. 1742–1795), was a British soldier and politician who sat in the House of Commons for 24 years from 1771 to 1795.

Whitmore was the son of Charles Whitmore a wine merchant of Southampton and his wife Mary Kelly. He joined the army and was Ensign in the 9th Foot in 1759. In 1761 was serving in the Grenadier Guards. He became captain in the 9th Foot in 1762 and major in 1767. He married firstly his cousin Mary Whitmore daughter of Thomas Whitmore of Apley, formerly MP, in June 1770.

In 1771 Whitmore was elected in a by-election as Member of Parliament for Bridgnorth, where a Whitmore was usually MP over two centuries. He succeeded to his uncle's estate at Apley Hall in 1773 and retired from the army. By 1774 he was his own patron and his election was unopposed in the 1774 general election. His first wife died in 1776 and he married again in January 1780 to Mary Foley, daughter of Captain Thomas Foley RN of Stockton, Shropshire. He was returned again as MP for Bridgnorth and also for Much Wenlock in 1780 but chose to sit for Bridgnorth. Subsequently, he was a member of the St. Alban's Tavern group which tried to bring together Pitt and Fox. He was returned for Bridgnorth again in 1784 and 1790.

Whitmore died aged 52 on 17 April 1795.

== Sources ==
Parliament of Great Britain
Preceded by The Lord Pigot; William Whitmore	Member of Parliament for Bridgnorth; 1771–1795; With: The Lord Pigot; Hugh Pigot; Isaac Hawkins Browne	Succeeded by Isaac Hawkins Browne; John Whitmore
Preceded by Sir Henry Bridgeman; George Forester	Member of Parliament for Much Wenlock; 1780–1780; With: Sir Henry Bridgeman	Succeeded by Sir Henry Bridgeman; George Forester
