= Richard Shelton =

Richard Shelton may refer to:

- Richard Shelton (actor), English actor and singer
- Richard Shelton (writer) (1933–2022), American writer, poet and professor of English
- Richard Shelton (American football) (born 1966), American football player
- Richard Shelton (solicitor general) (died 1647), English lawyer and politician
