= John Weaver (Bridgnorth MP) =

British lawyer and Whig politician

John Weaver (1675–1747), of Morville, near Bridgnorth, Shropshire, was a British lawyer and Whig politician who sat in the House of Commons from 1713 to 1734.

Weaver was baptized on 21 October 1675, the eldest son of Arthur Weaver of Morville and his wife Mary, who was probably the daughter of Eliezar Careswell of Shifnal, Shropshire. He was admitted at Inner Temple in 1689 and called to the bar in 1697. In 1710 he succeeded his father to Morville He married Sarah Acton on 22 November 1712

Weaver was related to the Whitmore and Acton families in Bridgnorth, and had inherited a considerable interest of his own in the borough from his grandfather who married an heiress of the Smythes of Morville. He was admitted as a freeman of Bridgnorth in 1710 and stood at the 1713 general election when he was returned unopposed as. Member of Parliament for Bridgnorth with his fellow Whig William Whitmore of Apley. He voted against the expulsion of Richard Steele on 18 March 1714.

At the 1715 general election, Weaver was returned as a Whig on his own interest and that of the Whitmores He voted with the Government, except on the Peerage Bill, which he opposed. He was returned again in 1722. On the death of William Whitmore in 1725, Weaver was elected recorder of the borough as a stop-gap while Thomas Whitmore was under age. He was returned again in 1727. In this parliament, he voted against the Administration and, in 1733, was taken into the custody of the serjeant at arms for defaulting on a call of the House. He did not stand at the 1734 general election...

Weaver died on 9 January 1747 leaving one son. Arthur who also became MP for Bridgnorth.

Parliament of Great Britain
Preceded by Whitmore Acton; Richard Cresswell	Member of Parliament for Bridgnorth; 1713–1734; With: William Whitmore 1713-1725; St John Charlton 1725-1734	Succeeded by Thomas Whitmore; Grey James Grove
