= 1870 Bridgnorth by-election =

UK Parliamentary by-election

The 1870 Bridgnorth by-election was fought on 16 February 1870. The by-election was fought due to the resignation of the incumbent Conservative MP Henry Whitmore. It was won by the unopposed Liberal candidate William Henry Foster. The Liberals would hold their gain at the 1874 general election.
