= John Dod (MP) =

English politician

John Dod (fl. 1329–1337) was an English politician. He sat as MP for Bridgnorth in 1328, 1332, 1335, 1336 and 1337.
