= Richard Cresswell (politician) =

English landowner and politician

Richard Cresswell (1688–1743) was an English landowner and politician.

The first son of a "roaring Shropshire squire" Richard Cresswell of Sidbury, Shropshire and his wife Mary Moreton, and grandson of a staunch Cavalier, also named Richard Cresswell (formerly a page to Charles I); Cresswell was nicknamed "Black Dick Cresswell". He had inherited his father's unstable traits, but also his grandfather's loyalism. His father, having been disinherited, was described as "a perfect madman", "a Judas and devil incarnate" by his son-in-law, who when obliged to stay with the family for a time at Sidbury, wrote that "to live with him (Cresswell the elder) is to live in Bedlam, for he is made up of noise, nonsense, railing, bawling and impertinence....".

Richard Cresswell succeeded in 1708 to his grandfather's very considerable estates, including several manors in Staffordshire, Shropshire and Herefordshire. By the time he married, Cresswell was already enjoying a reputation as a "giddy rake". He married, in 1709, Elizabeth, the daughter of Sir Thomas Estcourt, heiress to her brother Thomas Estcourt (d. 1704) of Pinkney Park, Sherston, Wiltshire. The addition of his wife's properties, including the Wiltshire manors of Sherston, Malmesbury and Norton, helped consolidate his position among the gentry of north Wiltshire.

In 1710, Cresswell stood as a Tory candidate for the borough of Bridgnorth, Shropshire, but after his election he made little impression on the House of Commons and is not known to have ever made a speech in Parliament. He was a member of the October Club; and in 1713 voted for the French commerce bill. The following election he was returned as the member for Wootton Bassett; however, after the death of Queen Anne, Cresswell refrained from any further involvement in Parliament, probably spending the remainder of his life abroad.

Elizabeth died in 1717 and he later married Roberta, a widow.

His already questionable reputation was sullied even further by his arrest in 1716 on thirty-eight separate counts of buggery "with a young Genoese boy he had lately dressed up". From 1726 till 1730 he was known to be in France, travelling with "one Mrs Smith, called his niece". In 1730, due to financial problems, he was forced to mortgage his Pinkney Park for £10,000; the Norton manor had already been sold in 1714. In his final years the administration of his estate was left to his son Thomas Estcourt Cresswell.

He died intestate in 1743, leaving two sons from his first marriage.

Parliament of Great Britain
Preceded by Sir Humphrey Brigges, Bt; William Whitmore	Member of Parliament for Bridgnorth; 1710–1713; With: Whitmore Acton	Succeeded by William Whitmore; John Weaver
Preceded by Richard Goddard; Edmund Pleydell	Member of Parliament for Wootton Bassett; 1713–1715; With: Edmund Pleydell	Succeeded by Sir James Long, Bt; William Northey
