= Reginald de Leyghes =

English politician (1292 – c. 1329)

Reginald de Leyghes (1292–c. 1329), also known as Reginald de Erdington was an English politician. He sat as MP for Bridgnorth in 1307 and 1315.

He was the son of Fremund de Erdington.
