= John Pule (MP) =

English politician

John Pule (fl. 1328–1329) was an English politician. He sat as MP for Bridgnorth in 1328 and 1330.

He was probably a son of Nicholas Pule.
