= Richard Roberd =

14th-century English politician

Richard Roberd (fl. 1297–1327) was an English politician. He sat as MP for Bridgnorth in 1300, 1301 and 1309.

He also served as Provost of Bridgnorth from 1297 till 1300. He was tax collector in Bridgnorth in 1327.
