= Edmund le Palmer =

English politician (died c. 1331)

Edmund le Palmer (died c. 1331) was an English politician. He sat as MP for Bridgnorth in 1315. He also served as Provost of the Borough in 1323.

He was the son of Nicholas le Palmer.
