= Walter le Palmer =

English politician

Walter le Palmer (fl. 1331–1338) was an English politician. He sat as MP for Bridgnorth in 1331 and 1338.
