= Stanley Hall, Shropshire =

Country house in Shropshire, England

Coordinates: 52.5609°N 2.4185°W

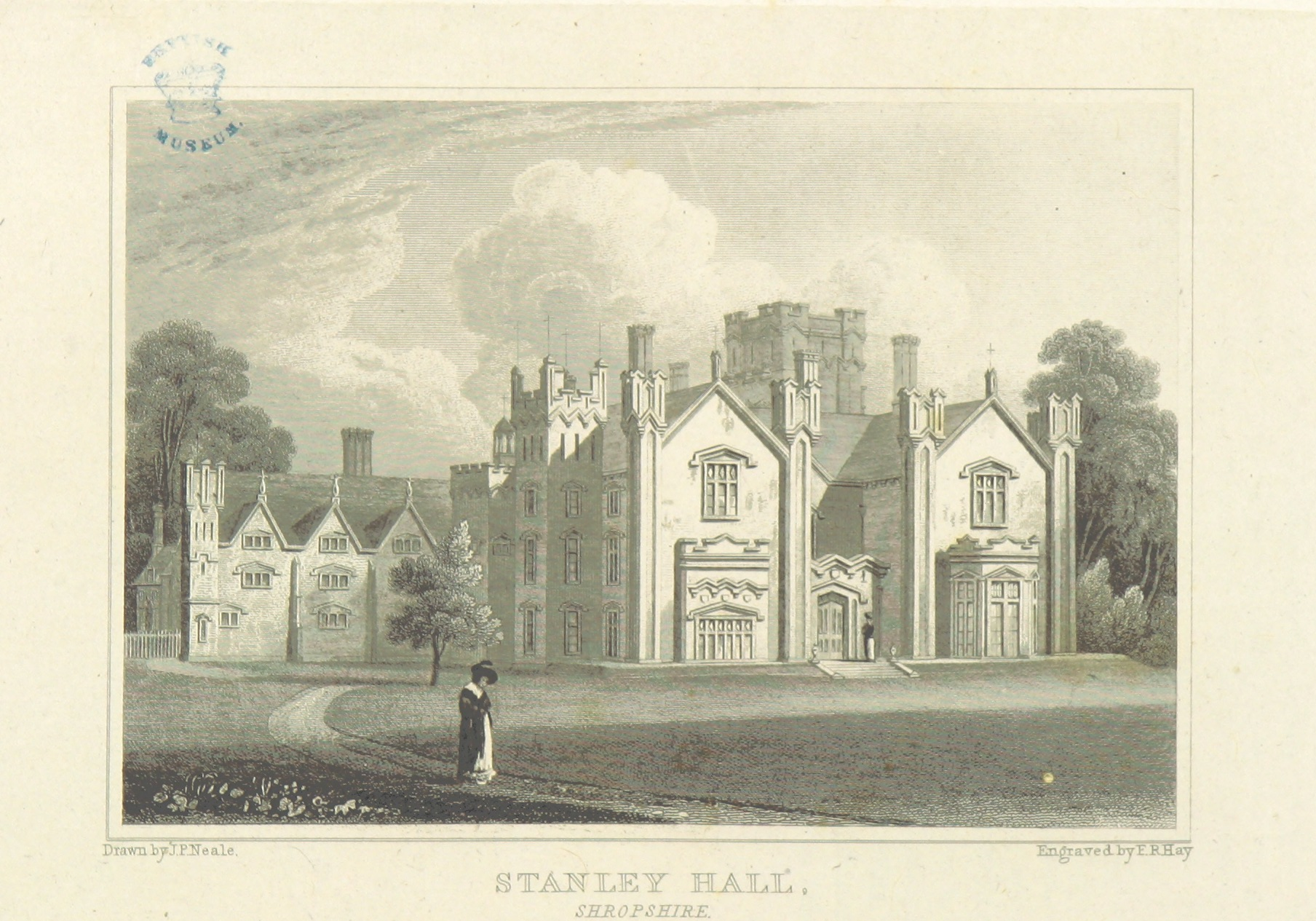
Stanley Hall, by John Preston Neale, 1818

Stanley Hall, near Astley Abbotts in Shropshire, England, is a Grade II–listed building that first gained its protected status in 1970. It probably dates to the early 17th century. It was for a time the family seat of the Tyrwhitt baronets.

== History ==
Stanley Hall is a two-story house located adjacent to the River Severn, near Bridgnorth. The 17th century timber-framed stone and brick house was considerably enlarged by John Smalman in the Tudor-Gothic style around c. 1816-1820 for Sir Thomas Tyrwhitt-Jones, 2nd Baronet.

The Hall was sold by his great-grandson, the well known eccentric Lord Berners, who sold the property and moved to Faringdon House in Oxfordshire. Thomas Cundy drew-up plans for the remodeling, but Tyrwhitt-Jones went to the local builder-cum-architect Smalman instead, who gave him the basic house we see today.
