= George Vernon (MP for Bridgnorth) =

English politician

George Vernon (1575/6–1639), of the Inner Temple, London and Haslington, Cheshire, was an English politician.

He was a member (MP) of the parliament of England for Bridgnorth in 1625 and 1626.
