= John Blockley =

English politician

John Blockley (fl. 1392–1401) was an English politician. He sat as MP for Bridgnorth in January 1397.

He was perhaps a son of Judge John Blockley of Blockley in Worcestershire.
