= Commissioners of Highland Roads and Bridges =

Highway (Scotland) Act 1803
- Act of Parliament
- Parliament of the United Kingdom
- Long title: An Act for granting to His Majesty the Sum of Twenty thousand Pounds to be issued and applies towards making Roads and building Bridges in the Highlands of Scotland; and for establishing the Proprietors of Land in Scotland to charge their Estates with a Proportion of the Expense of making and keeping in Repair Roads and Bridges in the Highlands of Scotland.
- Citation: 43 Geo. 3. c. 80
- Territorial extent: United Kingdom

Dates
- Royal assent: 4 July 1803
- Commencement: 4 July 1803 (Note: The Acts of Parliament (Commencement) Act 1793.)
- Repealed: 6 August 1872

Other legislation
- Repealed by: Statute Law Revision Act 1872

Status: Repealed

Text of statute as originally enacted

The Commissioners of Highland Roads and Bridges (formally the Commissioners for Roads and Bridges in the Highlands of Scotland) was created in 1803 to take responsibility for the construction and maintenance of the long-distance roads in the Scottish Highlands.

The commission was created following the 1802 inspection by Thomas Telford (on behalf of the government) of the state of the roads. The Scottish Highland Roads and Bridges Act 1803 (43 Geo. 3. c. 80) established the commission. The initial commissioners, named in section 4 of the 1803 act, were the Speaker of the House of Commons, the Chancellor of the Exchequer, and His Majesty's Advocate for Scotland, all for the Time being, the Rt Hon William Dundas, Sir William Pulteney, Bt, Isaac Hawkins Browne, Nicholas Vansittart, Charles Grant, William Smith, and Charles Dundas.

The commission was dissolved by the Highland Roads and Bridges Act 1862 (25 & 26 Vict. c. 105) with effect from 31 December of that year, and the roads managed by the commissioners and other property relating thereto was transferred to the commissioners of supply (except in the counties of Argyll and Caithness, where transfer was to the road trustees of those counties). Management of the roads was also transferred to the commissioners of supply, and to road trustees.
