= John Farnales =

English politician

John Farnales (died c. 1403) was an English politician. He sat as MP for Bridgnorth in 1385, February 1388, January 1390, 1393, 1394, and 1395.

He also served as bailiff of Bridgnorth from September 1385 till 1386 and 1391 till 1392; tax collector of Staffordshire in November 1386; and commissioner of inquiry concerning maladministration of the Alderbury priory in Shropshire in December 1390.
