= Commissioner of supply =

Scottish administrative body between 1667 and 1930

Commissioners of supply were local administrative bodies in Scotland from 1667 to 1930. Originally established in each sheriffdom to collect tax, they later took on much of the responsibility for the local government of the counties of Scotland. In 1890 they ceded most of their duties to the county councils created by the Local Government (Scotland) Act 1889. They were finally abolished in 1930.

== Creation ==
The Parliament of Scotland passed legislation creating commissioners of supply for each of the shires or sheriffdoms in 1667. The act specified that the commissioners for each sheriffdom should consist partly of ex officio members: all privy councillors and senators of the College of Justice "within the severall respective shyres wher any part of ther lands and estates doeth ly", and partly of nominated members: a number of named prominent landowners in each shire. The commissioners had the duty of ensuring the collection of "cess" or land tax to supply the financial needs of the sovereign. A total of 72,000 pounds was to be raised monthly throughout Scotland, with each sheriffdom responsible for a set sum. This ranged from 33,183 pounds and 8 shillings in Midlothian to 352 pounds, 7 shillings and 3 pence in Clackmannanshire. The royal burghs lying within each sheriffdom were not subject to the commissioners, the cess being collected by the burgh magistrates.

In 1686 the commissioners took on their first local government functions. In that year an act was passed providing that the repair of highways and bridges should be the responsibility of "the several shires and burghs... within their respective bounds". The sheriff of each shire was given the power to compel the commissioners of supply and justices of the peace to convene and agree funding and allocation of labour for road repairs.

== 1707–1930 ==
The commissioners continued to exist following the passing of the Act of Union in 1707. From 1718 they became responsible, along with justices of the peace, for county roads and bridges, and in 1832 they were charged with raising "rogue money" for the keeping of the peace.

In many cases the commissioners appointed special constables for all or parts of their counties, and by the Police (Scotland) Act 1857 they were required to establish a county police force, in all areas outside police burghs, from 1858.

In 1862, the functions and property of the Commissioners of Highland Roads and Bridges were transferred to the commissioners of supply.

In 1890, as a result of the Local Government (Scotland) Act 1889, virtually all of the powers and duties of the commissioners passed to the newly created county councils. The commissioners continued to exist, however, meeting once a year to elect a convener and to appoint members to the joint standing committee that was responsible for the county constabulary. The other members of the committee were nominated by the county council, and it was chaired by the sheriff of the county.

Commissioners of supply were finally abolished in 1930 by the Local Government (Scotland) Act 1929.
