= John de Kington =

English politician

John de Kington was an English politician. He sat as MP for Bridgnorth in 1319, 1322, 1328, 1335, 1336, 1337, 1338, Worcester in 1339 and Bridgnorth again in 1340.
