= Robert Aylesbury =

English politician

Robert Aylesbury (fl. 1421) was an English politician. He sat as MP for Bridgnorth in May 1421.

H. T. Weyman suggests in Transactions of the Shropshire Archaeological Society that Aylesbury is a member of the family of "Aylesbury, of Blatherwyck" but this appears unverifiable.
