= Henry Geffrey =

English politician

Henry Geffrey (fl. 1321–1334) was an English politician. He sat as MP for Bridgnorth in 1321, 1322, 1324, 1325, 1327, 1328, 1331, 1332, and 1334.

He was probably a descendant of John Geffrey, who served several times as Provost of Bridgnorth.
