= William Acton (MP for Bridgnorth) =

Member of the Parliament of England

William Acton (c. 1513 – 1567) of Aldenham in Shropshire was an English politician who served in the parliament of Kingdom of England.

== Career ==
Acton sat in two of Queen Mary's five Parliaments for Bridgnorth in Shropshire in April 1554 and 1555. Both times he was a Member of Parliament together with his distant kinsman, Jerome Horde. Acton joined Reginald Corbet and others from Shropshire in opposing a government bill in 1555.

Acton came from a family of lawyers. His eldest son may have studied law, but it's not known if Acton obtained a legal education. Acton had a close connection to Reginald Corbet and Roger Smith, Corbet helped Acton's son admission to the Middle Temple in 1552. Smith, related to Acton by marriage, promoted him from Bridgnorth in the two Edwardian Parliaments.

== Personal ==
Acton was the only surviving son of Thomas Acton and Elizabeth Dryland. Acton married Cecily Cresset, daughter of Richard Cresset of Upton Cressett in Shropshire, by 1534. Acton died on 7 May 1567 and was succeeded by his son Robert.

== Family ==
Acton had the following descendants:

- Robert Acton (1534-1597), grandfather of Sir Edward Acton, 1st Baronet (1600–1659)
- Richard Acton of London, mercer, married 1571 Margaret Daniel and had a son Sir William Acton, 1st and last Baronet (died 1651)
- Frances Acton (died 1577), married 1563 John Billingsley (c.1535-74), eldest son of William Billingsley and had children
- Rev Thomas Acton (died Jan 1615/6), vicar of Chelmarsh, Shropshire 1598-1616
- Roland Acton (died 1583), mercer, died unmarried
- Rev John Acton (1554-1624), rector of Wheathill, Shropshire, married 1594 Anne (Agnes) Head (died 1621) and had a daughter
- Francis Acton (died 1623), m. Bridget Powys, and had a son named Francis
- Mary Acton, married Humphrey Eaton, rector of Thornton, Herefordshire
- Elizabeth Acton (died after 1611), married c. 1584 Adam Doddington alias Detton (died 1611), son of Robert Detton and had children
- Jane Acton, married before 1575 Thomas Oseley
- Dorothy Acton, married John Jones
- Anne Acton, married John Stringer
