= Bromwich Hall - The Manor House Museum =

Museum in the West Midlands, England

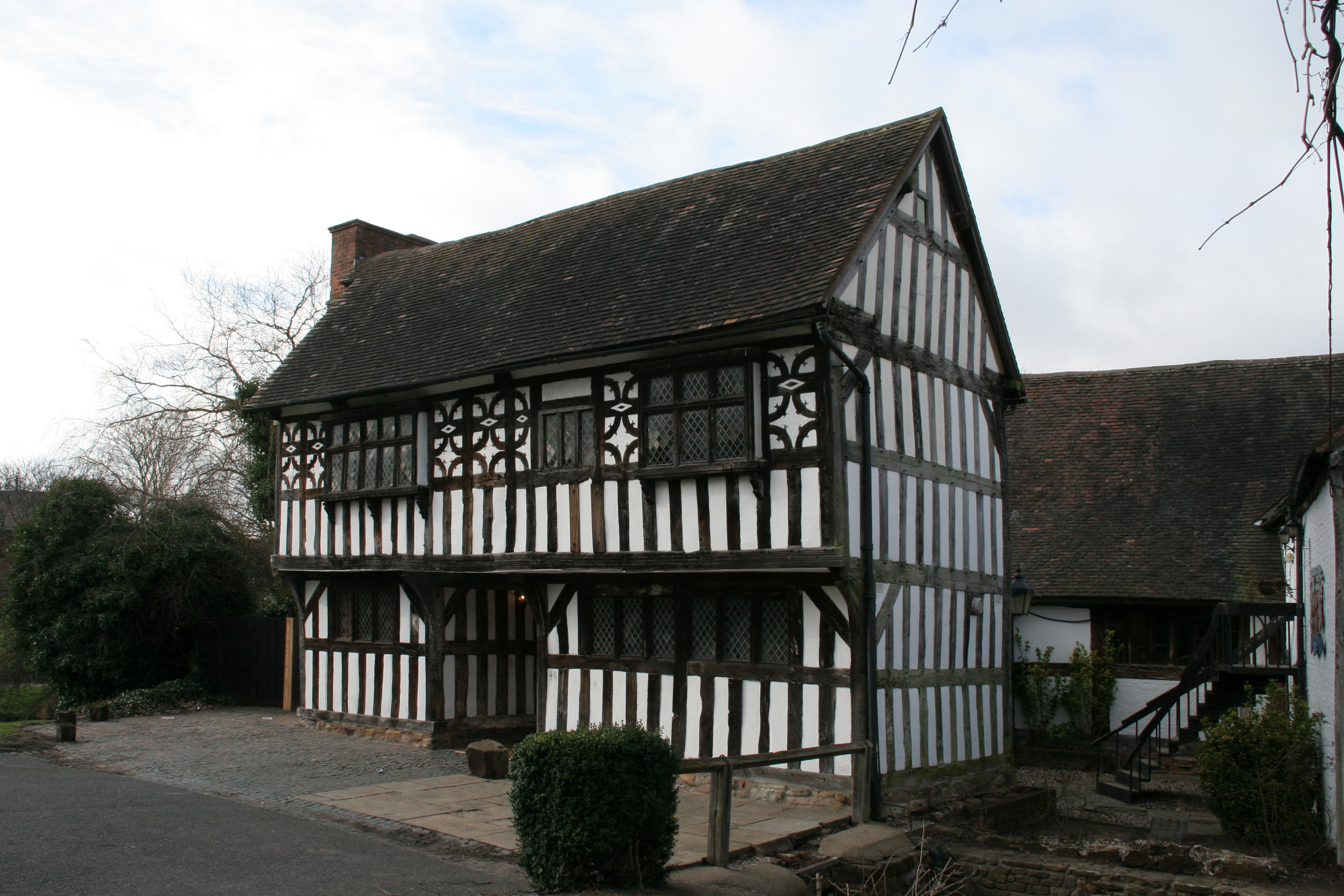
- Interactive map of the Bromwich Hall - The Manor House Museum area
- Former names: West Bromwich Manor House; The Manor House Restaurant; The Manor House Pub; Bromwic Hall; The Old Hall; West Bromwich Old Hall

General information
- Location: Hall Green Road, West Bromwich, England
- Coordinates: 52.5467°N 1.9932°W
- Completed: 1270 (approximately)
- Opened: May 2010
- Owner: Sandwell Metropolitan Borough Council

Website
- Sandwell Metropolitan Borough Council - Bromwich Hall, The Manor House Museum

Bromwich Hall - The Manor House Museum is an important, Grade I listed, medieval domestic building (a hall house) built by Richard de Marnham around 1270 as the centre of his agricultural estate in West Bromwich.

Only the Great Hall survives of the original complex of living quarters, agricultural barns, sheds and ponds. Successive occupants modernised and extended the manor house until it was described in 1790 as "a large pile of irregular half-timbered buildings, black and white, and surrounded with numerous out-houses and lofty walls." The building was saved from demolition in the 1950s by West Bromwich Corporation which carried out an extensive and sympathetic restoration of this nationally important building.

Today the museum is run by the Sandwell Museum Service.

== Architecture ==
The Victoria County History of Staffordshire states: “There was a manor-house at West Bromwich by the early 1220s. The oldest part of the present building, however, is the hall, which is thought to date from c. 1300, a time when the Marnham's had a house in West Bromwich. It has two full bays and a short entry bay, marked by a spere truss, at the south end. Presumably it originally extended further at each end to provide both service and private rooms, but they would have been removed in the earlier 15th century when the present cross wings were built. In the late 15th century a chapel, first referred to in 1552, was added at the east end of the north cross wing. The west wall of the hall was rebuilt when the oriel was added at its north end in the 16th century, and the detached kitchen block to the south-west of the service wing is of about the same date. About 1600 a two-storeyed gatehouse range was built to the east of the hall and the service wing was extended to join it. The enclosing moat is probably contemporary with the hall. Most of it was filled in about 1700, although the section in front of the gatehouse had been filled in earlier to make a forecourt."

However as previously mentioned in the opening paragraph, the oldest part of the building is the Great Hall which was built by Richard de Marnham circa 1270.

According to the will of Cecily Stanley in 1552, in the 16th and early 17th centuries, wheat and barley was being grown in the open fields, though in smaller quantities than rye and oats.

Additions and alterations were made to the hall during the 18th century, and in the 1790s it consisted “of a large pile of irregular half-timbered building, black and white, and surrounded with numerous out-houses and lofty walls” In 1823 the hall, with a farm-house, was sold and by 1836 three families were living there, including that of the assistant curate at All Saints' parish church. By the early 1880s the building had been converted into a number of tenements.

In 1950 the property, by then derelict, was bought by the corporation. After much controversy restoration was begun in 1957, and the 18th and 19th additions were removed. In 1961 the building was opened as a pub and restaurant by Ansells Brewery, the tenants of West Bromwich corporation. In 2009 The Manor House Pub and Restaurant closed.

In May 2010 Sandwell Metropolitan Borough Council Sandwell reopened the building after some restoration under its original name Bromwich Hall.

Since 2020 it has been undergoing some archaeological excavations in the private area behind the large table at the far end of the great hall, and in the former pub manager’s house in the museums grounds.

== The manor's occupants ==
On the death of Richard de Offini, Lord of West Bromwich in the mid 13th century, the manor was divided between his two daughters, Sarah, the wife of Walter de Everiis, and Margaret, by 1275 the wife of Richard de Marnham of Bromwich.

The hall was originally built by the de Marnham family. John de Marnham's heirs included William Freeman, son of his sister Isabel. In 1424 Freeman settled the manor on his daughter Alice, widow of William Freebody of Dudley. Their son, William Freebody, held the manor at his death in 1437 and was succeeded by his son William, who was then aged ten. By 1515 the manor was held by the younger William's granddaughter, Cecily, born in 1502.

Through Cecily the manor passed into the hands of the Stanley family. John Stanley, born about 1482 in West Bromwich, Staffordshire, was the son of George Stanley, a former High Sheriff of Staffordshire and Eleanor Dudley Beaumont, the widow of Sir Henry Beaumont of Wednesbury, Staffordshire, and daughter of the 1st Baron Dudley. On the death of his father-in-law, John Stanley acquired in his wife's right, the manor and estate of West Bromwich, holding it from Sir William Jervis by military service, and a rent of 22 pence per year. Following John's death in 1533, the manor was then passed down through several generations of the Stanley family, including Walter Stanley (1547–1613).

Under the terms of his will in 1614, Walter Stanley, a puritan, left property situated within the parishes of Erdington, Sutton Coldfield and Aston to endow a lectureship for the parish of West Bromwich. This provided for a clergyman to preach every Sunday and on the principal feasts and to visit the sick. He was to be an Oxford or Cambridge graduate, single, and not beneficed elsewhere. Besides the lands in Warwickshire, property in Wednesbury was subsequently added to the endowment together with further assets in 1662. The trust was reorganised by Act of Parliament in 1819, and in 1845 was still providing £151 (some 27%) of the minister's annual income. There was another organisation by Act of Parliament in 1949 and the 'Walter Stanley Trust' continues to support the parish of West Bromwich to this day.

In 1622 William Stanley who had inherited the estate in 1613, mortgaged the manor to his cousin, Richard Shelton (knighted in 1625) and Sir William Hewitt. Richard Shelton was made Solicitor General in 1625 by Charles I but was later pressured to resign in favour of Sir Edward Littleton. Shelton retired to the manor of West Bromwich, died in 1647, and was buried at West Bromwich. The manor eventually passed to his nephew, John Shelton who died in 1665 and was succeeded by his son, also John, a minor, whose inheritance is said to have been squandered by his stepfather. In 1713 the manor and estate were put up for sale by Chancery. John died in 1714, and his son Joseph inherited his embarrassments. In 1715 with the Sheltons in desperate circumstances all or most of the demesne lands were "neither set, mowed, nor grazed that year, but the product thereof rolled upon the ground". In 1720 the manor was sold to Sir Samuel Clarke, a London merchant whose family held the manor for almost a century. Thomas Clarke died mad in 1809, and his property was sold under a Chancery order of 1819. The manorial rights with property worth some £580 a year were bought by the Earl of Dartmouth in 1823.
