= Grey James Grove =

British Whig politician

Grey James Grove (1682 – 1742) of Pool Hall, Alveley, Shropshire, was a British Whig politician who sat in the House of Commons in two parliaments between 1715 and 1741.

Grove was baptized on 10 November 1682, the eldest son of James Grove of Alveley, serjeant-at-law, and his wife Anne Grey, daughter of Thomas Grey, Lord Grey of Groby MP. He married Penelope Jermyn, daughter of Thomas Jermyn, 2nd Baron Jermyn MP.

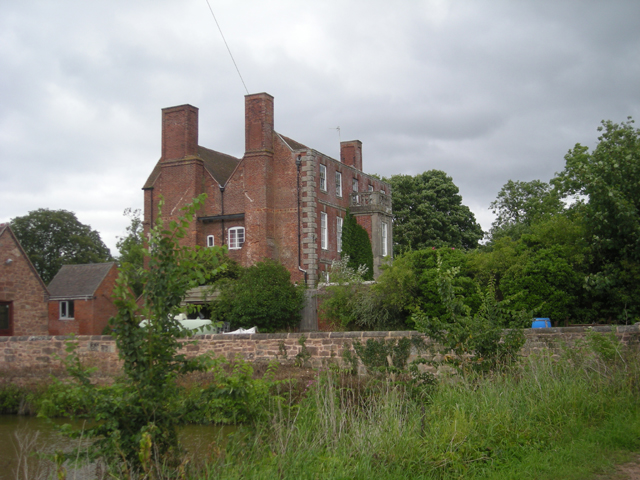
Pool Hall, Alveley

At the 1715 British general election, Grey was returned as Member of Parliament for Bewdley on the interest of Lord Herbert of Chirbury. He voted with the Administration except on the Peerage Bill, when he abstained. He did not stand at the 1722 British general election and was out of parliament for over ten years. He was High Sheriff of Shropshire from 1730 to 1731 and succeeded his father in 1734. He stood again at the 1734 British general election when he was elected in a contest at Bridgnorth on the Whitmore interest. He voted for the Spanish convention in 1739 and abstained on the place bill in 1740. He did not stand at the 1741 British general election.

Grove died in April 1742, leaving two sons.

Parliament of Great Britain
Preceded by Salwey Winnington	Member of Parliament for Bewdley; 1715–1722	Succeeded by Crewe Offley
Preceded by St John Charlton; John Weaver	Member of Parliament for Bridgnorth; 1734–1741; With: Thomas Whitmore	Succeeded by Thomas Whitmore; William Whitmore
