= Henry Whitmore =

English politician

Henry Whitmore (13 October 1813 – 2 May 1876) was an English Conservative politician who sat in the House of Commons between 1852 and 1870.

Whitmore was the son of Thomas Whitmore of Apley Park near Bridgnorth and his wife Catherine Thomasson, daughter of Thomas Thomasson of York. His father was member of parliament (MP) for Bridgnorth from 1806 to 1831. Whitmore was educated at Christ Church, Oxford. He was a deputy lieutenant and J.P. for Shropshire. He served as cornet in the South Salopian Yeomanry Cavalry in 1845.

At the 1852 general election, Whitmore was elected MP for Bridgnorth in succession to his brother Thomas Charlton Whitmore. A petition was lodged against his election, but ultimately dismissed. He was Lord of the Treasury and keeper of the Privy Seal to the Prince of Wales from March 1858 to June 1859. Whitmore served as the Conservative party whip for many years until 1869.

In 1865 Whitmore lost the seat in the election to John Dahlberg Acton (who became Lord Acton in 1869), but successfully petitioned and had the result overturned. The reinstated Whitmore was a Lord of the Treasury from July 1866 to December 1868, when the Conservatives lost power after implementation of the Reform Act 1867 and William Ewart Gladstone first became prime minister. In 1868, representation for Bridgnorth was reduced to one member, but Whitmore was returned (again defeating John Dahlberg Acton) and held the seat until 1870. In 1870, a by-election was held, and William Henry Foster elected to the seat, which he in turn held until its abolition in 1885.

Whitmore married Adelaide Anna Darby, daughter of Francis Darby of Coalbrookdale, Shropshire, in 1852. He died in 1876, at the age of 62.
