= Henry Townshend (died 1621) =

English politician

Henry Townshend (1537?–1621), of Cound and Ludlow, Shropshire, was an English politician.

He was a member (MP) of the parliament of England for Bridgnorth in 1571 and 1572, and for Ludlow in 1614.
