= Hugh Harnage =

English politician

Hugh Harnage (fl. 1400–1437) was an English politician. He sat as MP for Bridgnorth in 1402 and 1406, bailiff of Bridgnorth from September 1402 till 1403 and Sheriff of Shropshire from 12 November 1423 till 6 November 1424.

== Political career ==
He also served as escheator of Shropshire and the adjacent march from 29 November 1410 till 10 December 1411, 17 December 1426 till 12 November 1427; commissioner of inquiry concerning the death of Nicholas Smith at Halesowen in Shropshire in February 1412, concerning rights of common pasture in Morfe forest in February and June 1413, concerning escape of felons from Shrewsbury in November 1424; and justice of the peace in Shropshire from 28 May 1422 till July 1424.

== Family ==
He was probably the son and heir of Richard Harnage by Katherine, the daughter of Hugh Child. He married Margery, the daughter of Sir Richard Lacon and had three sons and one daughter.
