= Robert le Palmer =

English politician

Robert le Palmer (fl. 1311–1342) was an English politician. He sat as MP for Bridgnorth in 1311, 1312 till 1313, 1328, and 1330. He also served as Provost of Bridgnorth for six years.

He seems to have been the son of Roger le Palmer, the eldest son of William Fitz Hamon.
