= Listed buildings in Stockton, Worfield =

Stockton is a civil parish in Shropshire, England. It contains 20 listed buildings that are recorded in the National Heritage List for England. Of these, four are listed at Grade II*, the middle of the three grades, and the others are at Grade II, the lowest grade. It includes the villages of Stockton and Norton, and is otherwise mainly rural. In the parish is Apley Park, a country estate that contains a country house, a model farm, and other listed structures. Most of the other listed buildings are houses, the earliest of which are timber framed, and the other listed buildings include a church, its churchyard walls and rectory, a barn, a school, and village stocks and a whipping post.

== Key ==
Grade	Criteria
II*	Particularly important buildings of more than special interest
II	Buildings of national importance and special interest

== Buildings ==
Name and location	Photograph	Date	Notes	Grade
St Chad's Church; 52.59408°N 2.40116°W		15th century	The church incorporates some earlier material, but the oldest substantial surviving part is the lower stages of the tower, the rest of the church being rebuilt in 1858–59. It is built in sandstone, and has a cruciform plan, consisting of a nave, north and south transepts, a chancel with a north vestry, and a west tower. The tower has three stages, diagonal buttresses, a west doorway with a pointed arch, a four-light west window, and an embattled parapet with gargoyles and the bases of corner pinnacles. In the north wall of the chancel is a Norman window.	II*
13 and 14 Cheswardine Lane; 52.59861°N 2.40776°W	—	17th century	The houses are timber framed with painted brick infill, and thatched roof. There is one storey and an attic, and four bays. The doorways have plain surrounds, and the windows are casements.	II
17 Cheswardine Lane; 52.59860°N 2.40865°W	—	17th century	Two cottages combined into one, the building is timber framed with painted brick infill and a tile roof. There is one storey and an attic, three casement windows, a doorway with a plain surround, and two gabled dormers.	II
1 Norton; 52.60205°N 2.40435°W	—	17th century	The house is partly timber framed and partly in brick, and has a roof of cedar shingle. There is one storey and an attic, and three bays. The windows are casements, and there is a gabled dormer.	II
24 Village Road; 52.60122°N 2.40150°W		17th century	A timber framed cottage with a thatched roof, one storey and an attic, three bays, and a brick extension on the left. The windows are casements, and there are two gabled dormers with plain bargeboards.	II
Barn northwest of The Hundred House; 52.60050°N 2.40277°W		17th century	The barn is timber framed with painted brick nogging, a thatched roof, and doors at the ends.	II
Rectory; 52.59328°N 2.40116°W	—	c. 1702	The rectory is to the south of the church, and is in red brick with modillion eaves and a tile roof. There are three storeys, five bays, and flanking two-storey wings. In the centre is a pedimented porch, the windows are sashes, and on the garden front is a bay window.	II*
Apley Park; 52.58109°N 2.42648°W		18th century	A Georgian mansion incorporated into a Gothic country house between 1811 and 1820, it is built in Grinshill sandstone, and has three storeys and embattled parapets. The entrance front has eight bays and is flanked by octagonal towers. There is a single storey porte-cochère with polygonal angle tourelles, and in the outer bays are two-storey canted bay windows with crocketed pinnacles; the other windows are mullioned. Recessed to the right a chapel-like façade fronts the earlier mansion, which has sash windows.	II*
Churchyard walls 52.59402°N 2.40169°W	—	18th century (probable)	The walls are on the east and south sides of the churchyard of St Chad's Church. They are in sandstone, and are surmounted by crocketed finials formerly on the church parapets.	II
The Hundred House; 52.60036°N 2.40246°W		18th century	A brick house with corbelled eaves, two storeys and an attic, and five bays. The central doorway has a moulded surround and a fanlight, the windows are mullioned and transomed casements, and on the right side is a porch with pilasters and a pediment.	II
The Gardener's Cottage, Apley Park; 52.58465°N 2.42172°W	—	1765	Originally an orangery, it was converted into a cottage in the 19th century. It is in red brick with stone dressings, a parapet and a slate roof. There are two storeys and a symmetrical three-bay front, the middle bay projecting under a moulded cornice and pediment with urns. The windows are sashes, and at the rear is a gabled wing and outshuts.	II
Outbuildings, Apley Park; 52.58126°N 2.42799°W	—	1775	The outbuildings surround a courtyard, and are in red brick with two storeys, and a hipped slate roof. The main range, facing east, is stuccoed, and contains sash windows, and a central tower that has a pointed archway with a hood mould, a clock face in a moulded diagonally-set surround, a pierced quatrefoil, and an embattled parapet with a weathervane.	II
Stockton Lodge; 52.59251°N 2.43110°W	—	c. 1812	The lodge is stuccoed, with two storeys, a moulded cornice, and a parapet, embattled in the centre. The lodge consists of a central porte-cochère containing a pointed arch and a hood mould, and a pair of wrought iron gates, flanked by lodges with projecting outer wings, containing sash windows with hood moulds.	II
5 and 6 Village Road and outbuildings 52.60082°N 2.40143°W		Early to mid 19th century	A pair of estate cottages in red brick with hipped tile roofs. They have a single storey, two bays each, outshuts at the rear, and detached outbuildings. The windows are casements with simple hood moulds, and the outbuildings include wash houses, stores and pig sties.	II
Stockton Grange; 52.59436°N 2.39999°W	—	Early to mid 19th century	The house is rendered with a tile roof, two storeys and three bays. On the front is an ornamental cast iron porch, and the doorway has a moulded surround, side lights, and a shallow segmental fanlight. The windows are sashes with hood moulds, and the gable ends have ornamental bargeboards.	II
South Lodge; 52.59847°N 2.40156°W	—	c. 1840	A red brick house with dentilled eaves and a tile roof. There are two storeys and an L-shaped plan, consisting of a three-bay main range and a projecting gabled wing on the left. The middle bay projects and contains a doorway with a semicircular head, a moulded stuccoed surround, and a radial fanlight. The windows are sashes with cambered heads, and the gables have ornamental bargeboards.	II
Norton Village School; 52.60069°N 2.40232°W		c. 1860	The school is in buff brick with dressings in blue brick, and a tile roof with diaper decoration in yellow tiles, pierced ridge tiles, and stone coped gables. It is in High Victorian style. There is a T-shaped plan, with a front range of two classrooms with two porches, a clock tower, and a rear wing. Between the porches are two buttresses, and the porches have round-arched entrances. At the east end are diagonal buttresses, and a five-light window over which is a segmental arch with a chequered pattern in the tympanum. The tower has clock faces in oculi and a saddleback roof, and most of the windows have diamond glazing.	II
Home Farm, Apley Park; 52.59314°N 2.42315°W	—	1875	A model farm with buildings in red brick, dressings in blue brick, and slate roofs. The buildings consist of a barn, a boiler house, two covered cattle yards, and to the east is a single-storey manager's house. The south front is symmetrical and has a projecting central wing with three bays and two storeys. In the centre is a gable with an oculus, above which is a square bellcote.	II*
21 Cheswardine Lane; 52.59708°N 2.40942°W	—	Undated	A timber framed cottage with painted brick nogging and a tile roof. There is one storey and an attic, one casement window, one gabled dormer, and a doorway with a plain surround.	II
Stocks and whipping post 52.60052°N 2.40231°W		Undated	The village stocks and whipping post are at a junction in the centre of the village, and are surrounded by an enclosure consisting of four wooden posts and chains.	II
