= Thomas Horde (17th-century MP) =

English politician

Thomas Horde (1560 – after 1622) was an English politician. He sat as MP for Bridgnorth in 1601.

He was the son of John Horde (died 1581) by Katherine, the daughter of Adam Otley. He was educated at Furnival's Inn and entered Lincoln's Inn in 1581. He married Mary, the daughter of Edward Foxe and they had one son and six daughters.
