= William Whitmore (British Army officer) =

Lieutenant-General William Whitmore MP
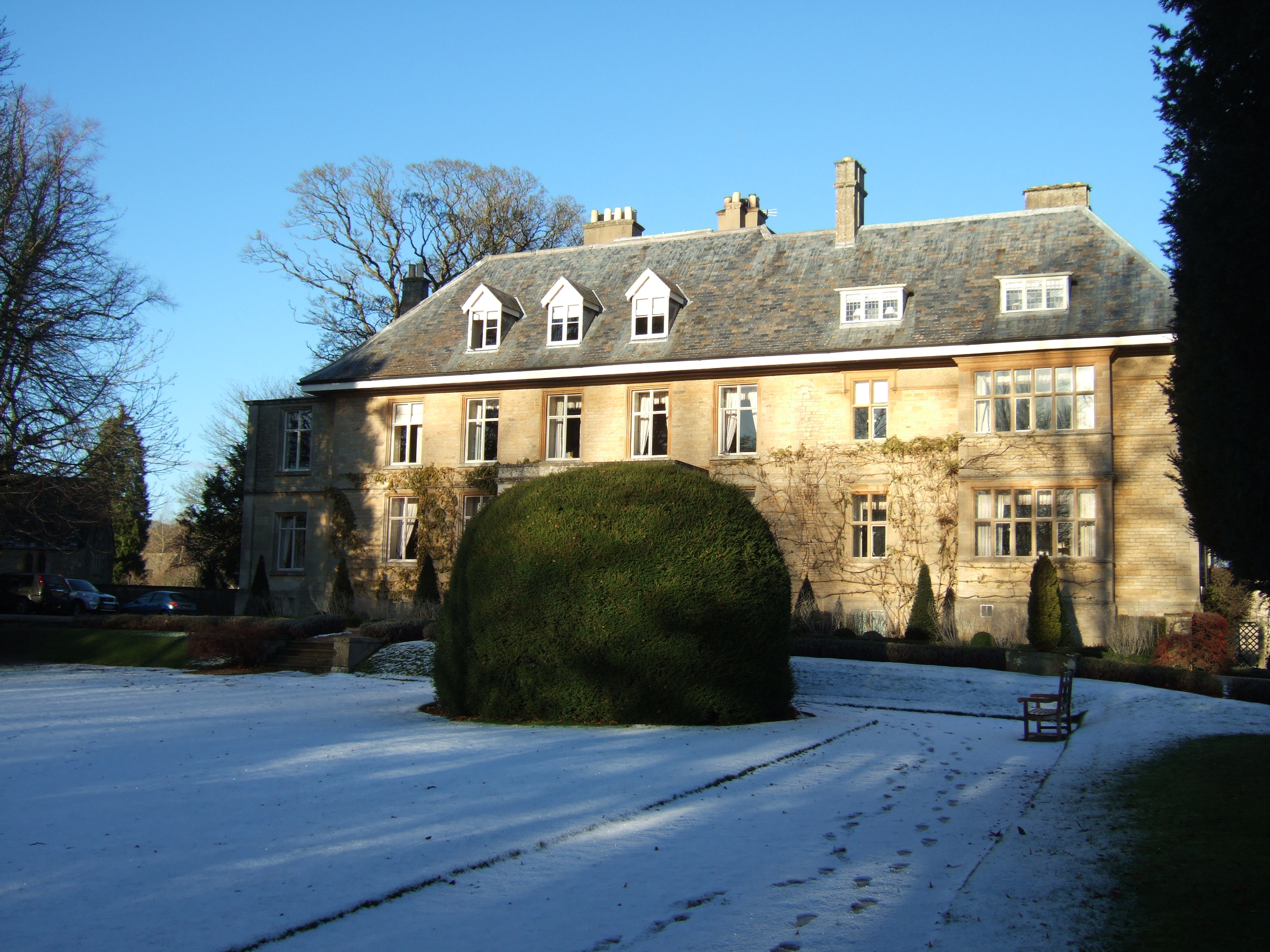
- Lower Slaughter Manor - Whitmore family seat
- Born: 14 May 1714
- Died: 22 July 1771 (age 57)
- Military career
- Allegiance: Great Britain
- Branch: British Army
- Rank: Lieutenant-General

Lieutenant General William Whitmore (14 May 1714 – 22 July 1771) was a British Army officer and Member of Parliament (MP).

He was the son of William Whitmore, MP of Lower Slaughter, Gloucestershire.

He joined the Army, reaching the rank of Lieutenant-General in 1760. in 1755 he was ordered to raise a new regiment, originally to be called the 55th Foot, but subsequently named the 53rd Foot. After the regiment was formed he was given its colonelcy, prior to the regiment sailing to Gibraltar for garrison duties. In 1758 he was transferred as colonel to the 9th Regiment of Foot, a commission he held until his death.

He was Member of Parliament for Bridgnorth from 1741 to 1747 and from 1754 to 1771. He was made Warden of the Mint from 1766 to his death in 1771.

He died unmarried, but left a son and 2 daughters.

Parliament of Great Britain
Preceded by Thomas Whitmore; Grey James Grove	Member of Parliament for Bridgnorth; 1741–1747; With: Thomas Whitmore	Succeeded by Thomas Whitmore; Arthur Weaver
Preceded by Thomas Whitmore; Arthur Weaver	Member of Parliament for Bridgnorth; 1754–1771; With: Hon. John Grey 1754–1768; The Lord Pigot 1768–1771	Succeeded by The Lord Pigot; Thomas Whitmore
Political offices
Preceded by John Jeffreys	Warden of the Mint; 1766–1771	Succeeded by Robert Pigot
Military offices
New regiment	Colonel of the 55th (later 53rd) Regiment of Foot; 1755–1758	Succeeded by John Toovey
Preceded by Hon. Joseph Yorke	Colonel of the 9th Regiment of Foot; 1758–1771	Succeeded by The Viscount Ligonier
