= Thomas Horde (14th-century MP) =

English politician

Thomas Horde (fl. 1372–1400) was an English politician. He sat as MP for Bridgnorth in 1391 and 1399.

He also served as bailiff of Bridgnorth from September 1386 till 1387, 1392 till 1393 and 1398 till 1399; and commissioner to make arrests in Shropshire and Staffordshire in December 1400.

He was the son of John Horde. He married Alice, the daughter and coheiress of John Palmer and had one son, Thomas Horde.
