= John Broke =

16th-century English politician

John Broke (by 1511 – 1561 or later) was the member of the Parliament of England for Marlborough for the parliament of November 1554.

He was mayor of Marlborough in 1551–52 and 1560–61.
