= Thomas Whitmore (died 1773) =

British Whig politician

Sir Thomas Whitmore (21 December 1711 – 1773) of Apley, near Bridgnorth, Shropshire, was a British Whig politician who sat in the House of Commons from 1734 to 1754.

== Early life ==
Whitmore was the second but eldest surviving son of William Whitmore of Lower Slaughter, Gloucestershire and Apley, Shropshire, and his wife Anne Weld, daughter of Sir John Weld, MP, of Willey, Shropshire. In 1725 he succeeded to the family estates on the death of his father. He married Anne Cope, daughter of Sir Jonathan Cope, 1st Baronet of Bruern Abbey, Oxfordshire.

== Career ==
At the 1734 British general election, Whitmore was returned on the family interest as Member of Parliament for Bridgnorth soon after coming of age. He was appointed recorder of Bridgnorth in 1735, retaining the post for the rest of his life. In Parliament, he spoke against a place bill in 1735, and voted against the Spanish convention in 1739, having been persuaded by the Prince of Wales who was in the House canvassing the Members. He did not vote on the place bill in 1740. He was returned as MP for Bridgnorth at the 1741 British general election and voted with the Administration in all recorded divisions. On 28 May 1744, he was knighted (K.B). He enlisted in Lord Powis's regiment of militia during the 1745 rebellion. In 1746, he was classed as Old Whig and was returned as MP for Bridgnorth at the 1747 British general election. In 1748 he applied unsuccessfully to the Duke of Newcastle with the support of other Shropshire Whigs including Lord Powis, for the office of governor of North Carolina for his younger brother George Whitmore. In 1753 he wrote to Newcastle asking for a place for his brother who had nothing but the small younger brother's fortune to live upon. In 1754, Whitmore succeeded his cousin Catherine Pope to her property and he retired from Parliament at the 1754 British general election.

== Death and legacy ==
Whitmore died on 15 April 1773, leaving three daughters.

Parliament of Great Britain
Preceded by St John Charlton; John Weaver	Member of Parliament for Bridgnorth; 1734–1754; With: Grey James Grove; William Whitmore 1741; Arthur Weaver 1747	Succeeded by Hon. John Grey; William Whitmore
