= Richard Shelton (solicitor general) =

Solicitor General for England and Wales (died 1647)

Sir Richard Shelton (died 1647) was an English lawyer and politician who served as Solicitor General between 1625 and 1634.

== Early life ==
Richard Shelton (or Sheldon or Shilton) was the elder of the two sons of John Shelton (d. 1601) a mercer of Birmingham, by his wife Barbara, daughter and heir of Francis Stanley of West Bromwich, Staffordshire. He was educated at King Edward's School, Birmingham before he studied law at the Inner Temple, and had the good fortune to be employed by Charles I’s favourite, the Duke of Buckingham who was probably the means of Shelton's appointment as Reader at the Inner Temple in 1624.

== Solicitor General ==
It was also to Buckingham’s influence that Shelton owed his promotion as Solicitor General in October 1625 and was knighted by Charles I at Hampton Court that month. He sat in Parliament for Bridgnorth in Shropshire but his lack of debating power rendered him no match for Coke and the great opposition lawyers of the day. In 1628 he was appointed Treasurer of the Inner Temple.

As Solicitor General, Shelton was appointed to a commission to compound with recusants in November 1625 and in December 1633 to the reinforced High Commission, which exercised ecclesiastical jurisdiction in England and Wales. During a Commons debate in February 1629 he defended the appointment of Richard Montagu, object of attack in the Commons, as bishop of Chichester.

After the assassination of Buckingham in August 1628 Shelton does not appear to have had a major patron. When the Attorney General, Sir Robert Heath was appointed Chief Justice of the Common Pleas in October 1631 it was not Shelton, but William Noy, who succeeded him as Attorney although the succession of the Solicitor General to the post was the usual pattern. It is not known whether Shelton pushed his case for promotion; if he did, his failure may have been because he lacked a strong patron at court.

== Downfall ==
In October 1634, being, according to Clarendon, "an old, illiterate, useless person," Shelton was pressured into resignation and was succeeded by Sir Edward Littleton. However, as he had not been accused of misbehaviour, he could not simply be dismissed and Shelton was able to negotiate a settlement that left him King's counsellor-at-large, with his former status and profits intact, and it appears that he could have opted for appointments as King's serjeant or puisne justice.

More recently it has been suggested that he may have made himself unacceptable to the government by expressing doubts about the legality of levying Ship Money in peacetime, or that both he and Sir Robert Heath were forced out in the autumn of 1634 when an old matter – an agreement made under James I concerning plantations in Ulster and the obligations of the City of London - resurfaced in a Star Chamber case in the summer of that year. Having apparently been interpreted in a lax fashion by the law officers of the Crown (Heath as Attorney General, Shelton as Solicitor General) this caused the King some displeasure. However, it is also possible that William Laud, archbishop of Canterbury, in cementing his power at court wanted law officers in place, like Sir Edward Littleton, who owed a personal loyalty to him.

== Later life ==
Shelton was not greatly involved with government business after he gave up his position although in March 1639 he joined other benchers of the Inner Temple in making a contribution to support the king's expedition against Scotland. He retired to the manor of West Bromwich, which he had acquired from his cousin William Stanley in 1626, together with 1,599 acres of land. He contributed £150 to the Staffordshire Parliamentarian county committee in 1644 and otherwise lived there apparently without incident throughout the Civil War and died there in December 1647. He was buried at West Bromwich on 7 December. He and his wife Lettice, the daughter of Sir Robert Fisher of Packington, had no children and the manor eventually passed to their nephew, John Shelton.
