= Apley Hall =

English Gothic Revival house

Coordinates: 52°34′52″N 2°25′36″W

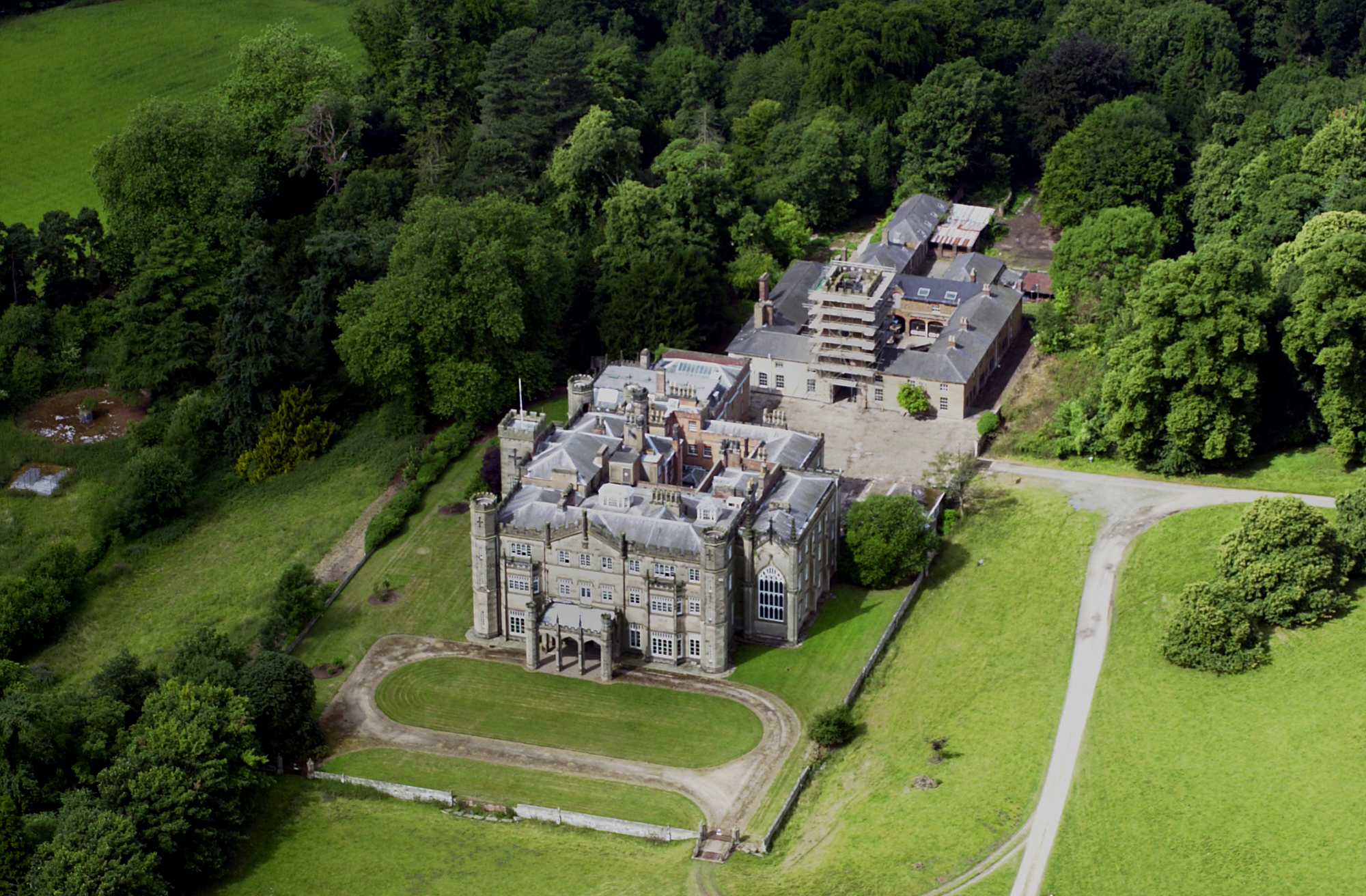
Apley Hall during restoration work in 2001

Apley Hall is an English Gothic Revival house located in the parish of Stockton near Bridgnorth, Shropshire. The building was completed in 1811 (215 years ago) with adjoining property of 180 acres (0.73 km^{2}) of private parkland beside the River Severn. It was once home to the Whitmore & Foster families. The Hall is a Grade II* listed building claimed as one of the largest in the county of Shropshire.

== History ==
The Whitmore family had been feudal landowners of Apley since 1572 when the manor was purchased by William Whitmore (d. 1593), a haberdasher of London. The will of William Whitmore, dated 6 August 1593 records:

ANNO 36 ELIZABETH. Monday next after the Feast of S. Ambrose, Bishop [4 April] Whitmore (William), haberdasher.—To George, William, and Thomas his sons he leaves the manor or lordship of Stockton, co. Salop, and his lands, tenements, &c., at Stockton, Apley, Hickford, Astley, and Norton, co. Salop, by equal thirds, in several tail, with cross remainders; remainder to Elizabeth, Anne, Margaret, Mary, "Francis," and Jane his daughters. Provision made against cutting off the entail. To Anne his wife the farm called "Balmes," (fn. 14) situate in the parishes of Hackney, Shorditch, and Tottenham, for life; remainder to all his children equally. Dated 6 August, 35 Elizabeth [A.D. 1593]. Roll 274 (15).

William Whitmore's eldest son was Sir William Whitmore of Apley, knight, High Sheriff of Shropshire in 1620, and his second son was Sir George Whitmore (d. 1654), Lord Mayor of London. Sir William resided at Apley and in 1634 purchased the manor of Balmes in Hackney, held under a lease by his father, for his brother Sir George, who there received King Charles I in 1641. Sir William's son and heir was Sir Thomas Whitmore, 1st Baronet (d. 1653). On the second baronet's childless death in 1699 Apley passed to his cousin William (died 1725).

The existing Georgian style house was remodeled during the Regency period in Neo-Gothic style between 1808 and 1811 for Thomas Whitmore, High Sheriff of Shropshire in 1806 and Member of Parliament for Bridgnorth 1806–31. It incorporated a faux chapel, hexagonal turrets and battlements. Design work has been attributed to members of the architectural Wyatt family but more likely John Webb and construction work was undertaken by the Carline family of Shrewsbury.

Thomas Whitmore's son Thomas Charlton Whitmore strongly opposed the construction of the Severn Valley Railway which ran through the Apley Park estate on the opposite bank of the river Severn. The railway opened in 1862 after the Severn Valley Railway Company agreed to pay £14,000 compensation and £150 per acre for the land purchased, and also to provide a station at which at least two trains per day in each direction could be stopped on request. Linley station was built to meet that requirement.

In 1867, the Foster family purchased the property for a record amount. Famous English eccentric Gerald Tyrwhitt-Wilson, 14th Baron Berners was related to the Fosters (as a grandson of William Orme Foster, the purchaser) and was born at Apley in 1883. The Hall and Estate remained in Foster family ownership until 1960 when the last incumbent of the Foster family died and the Hall passed onto his nephew General Goulburn and from him to Lord Hamilton of Dalzell.

Due to the vastness of the house and its substantial upkeep it was difficult to find a family willing to occupy Apley Hall and so alternative uses were sought. In 1962 the house became a state secondary modern boarding school run by Shropshire County Council and remained so until its closure in 1987.

Apley Hall remained empty and suffered a great deal of deterioration and vandalism during the following 10 years and was listed on English Heritage’s Buildings at Risk. in 1997 the house was bought by Neil Avery an entrepreneur and conservation specialist as a family home, the house was restored and subsequently removed from the Buildings at Risk register. During 2003 the house was sold to specialist developers who have since divided the Hall into several self-contained apartments.

There had long been speculation that Jeeves and Wooster author P. G. Wodehouse had based his fictitious Blandings Castle on Apley, a point raised by Michael Cobb in 1977, based on studying railway journeys and times. In 2003, Dr Daryl Lloyd and Dr Ian Greatbatch (two researchers in the Department of Geography and Centre for Advanced Spatial Analysis, University College London) made use of a Geographic Information System to analyse a set of geographical criteria, such as a viewshed analysis of The Wrekin and drive time from Shrewsbury. Their final conclusion was that Apley was the best suited location for fulfilling the geographical criteria.

In 2004 the hall was put up for sale and made into divided apartments, the most expensive of which was sold for £1.5 million, whilst the rest of the 8,500 acre estate is still owned by the Baron Hamilton of Dalzell family.

== A Sporting Estate ==
In the late nineteenth century the Apley Hall estate was developed as a sporting estate. The memoirs of its inter-war head game keeper, Norman Sharpe, were published in 2008. Sharpe says that the inter-war years were ’the golden years’ when shooting parties included royalty, diplomats,aristcrats, military officers politicians, film stars etc. He also describes how the estate staff managed ’nature’ on the estate to ensure that large numbers of animals were available to be ‘bagged' throwing light on the culture of estate management and shooting and fishing practice as well as links to neighbouring estates and the estate workforce.

== See also ==
- Grade II* listed buildings in Shropshire Council (A–G)
- Listed buildings in Stockton, Shropshire
