= Stockton, Worfield =

Village in Shropshire, England

Coordinates: 52.592700°N 2.4004926°W

Stockton
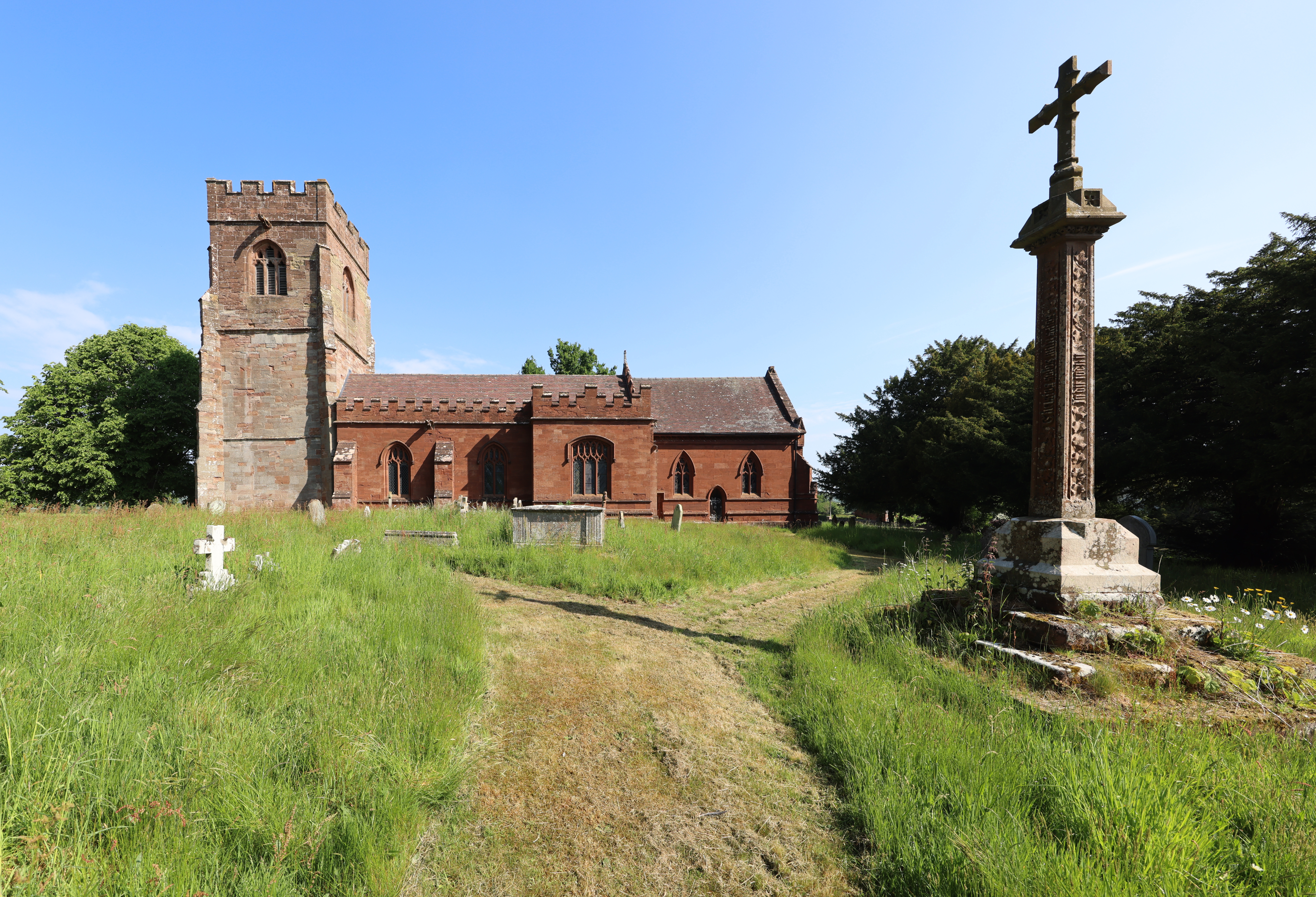
- St Chad's Church

- Location within Shropshire
- Area: 12.9468 km^{2} (4.9988 sq mi)
- Population: 331 (2011 census)
  - Density: 26/km^{2} (67/sq mi)
- Civil parish: Stockton
- Unitary authority: Shropshire
- Ceremonial county: Shropshire
- Region: West Midlands
- Country: England
- Sovereign state: United Kingdom
- Police: West Mercia
- Fire: Shropshire
- Ambulance: West Midlands
- Website: https://www.hugofox.com/community/stockton-parish-council-10617/home

Stockton is a village and civil parish 17 miles (27 km) south east of Shrewsbury, in the Shropshire district, in the county of Shropshire, England. The parish includes the village of Norton and the hamlet of Higford. In 2011, the parish had a population of 331. The parish borders Astley Abbotts, Badger, Barrow, Beckbury, Broseley, Sutton Maddock and Worfield.

== Landmarks ==
There are 20 listed buildings in Stockton. Stockton has a church called St Chad.

== History ==
The name "Stockton" probably means 'farm/settlement associated with an outlying farm/settlement'. Stockton was recorded in the Domesday Book as Stochetone.
