= John Whitmore (banker) =

English banker and politician

John Whitmore (15 October 1750 – 9 October 1826) was an English merchant, banker and politician, Member of Parliament for Bridgnorth from 1795 to 1806.

Whitmore was Governor of the Bank of England from 1808 to 1810. He had been Deputy Governor from 1807 to 1808. He replaced Beeston Long as Governor and was succeeded by John Pearse.

== See also ==
- Chief Cashier of the Bank of England
