= Sir Robert Pigot, 4th Baronet =

British politician

Sir Robert Pigot, 4th Baronet (3 November 1801 – 1 June 1891), was a British Conservative politician who sat in the House of Commons in two periods between 1832 and 1853.

Pigot was the son of General Sir George Pigot, 3rd Baronet and his wife Mary Anne Monckton.

At the 1832 general election, Pigot was elected as Conservative Member of Parliament for Bridgnorth. He held the seat until 1837. He was re-elected in 1838 and held the seat until 1853 when his election in 1852 was declared void. Pigot inherited the baronetcy in 1841. He was Deputy Lieutenant of Shropshire.

He married Emily Georgiana Elise Benyon of Ash Hall, Whitchurch, Shropshire.

Baronetage of Great Britain
| Preceded by George Pigot | Baronet (of Patshull); 1841–1891 | Succeeded by George Pigot |
