= Thomas Whitmore (1782–1846) =

English Whig politician

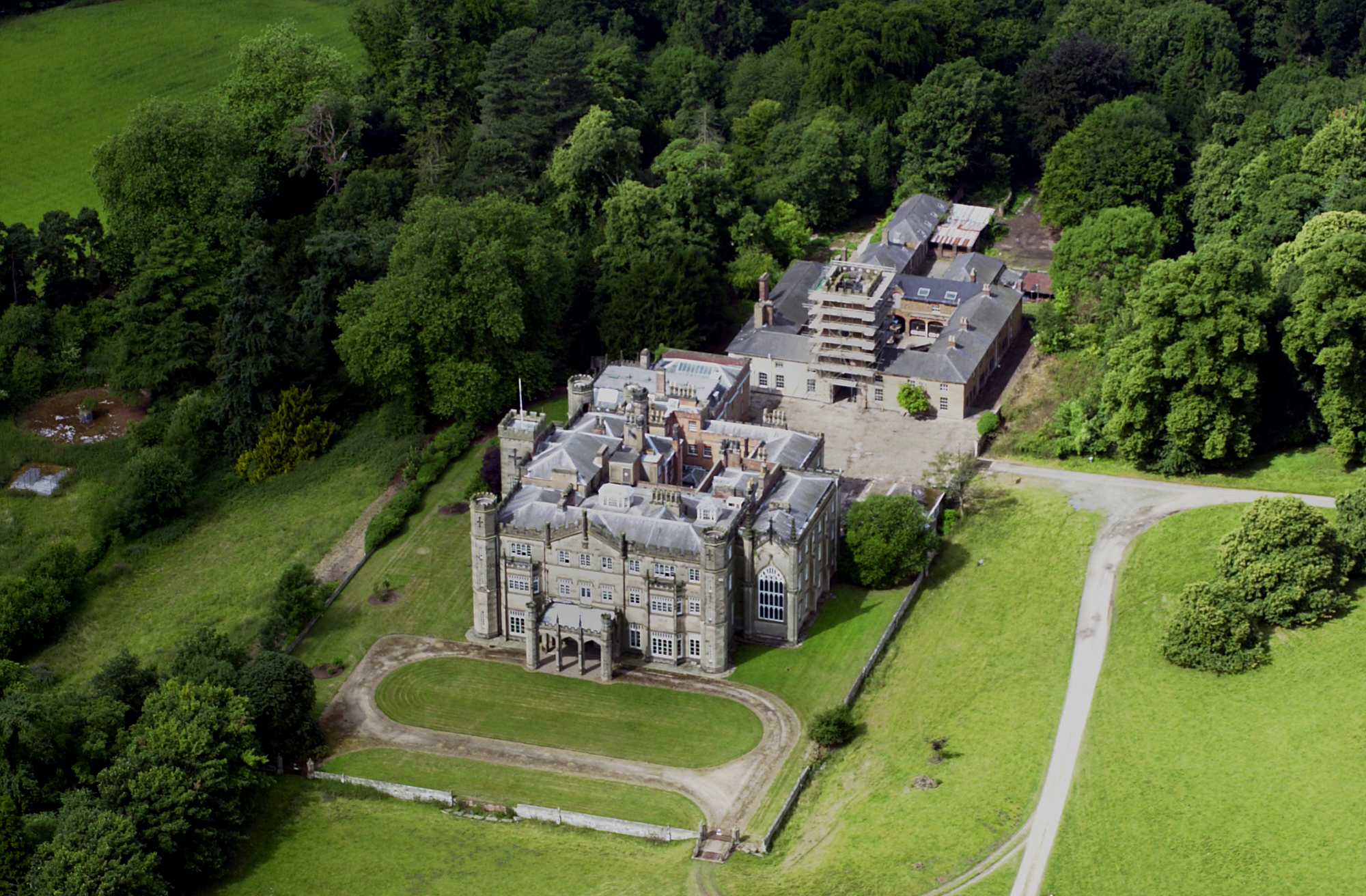
Apley Hall, Shropshire

Thomas Whitmore (16 November 1782 – 6 February 1846) was an English Whig politician who sat in the House of Commons from 1806 to 1831.

Whitmore was the eldest son of Thomas Whitmore of Apley Park, Stockton, Shropshire and his wife Mary Foley and was educated at Eton College (1796-79) and Christ Church, Oxford (1799). He was recorder of the borough of Bridgnorth and lay Dean of the royal peculiar of Bridgnorth.

He inherited Apley Park in 1795 on the death of his father and in 1811 extensively rebuilt Apley Hall. The following year he became a partner in the London bank of Chatteris, Whitmore & Co. He was a J.P. and Deputy Lieutenant for Shropshire and was appointed High Sheriff of Shropshire for 1805–06.

In 1806 Whitmore was elected as a Member of Parliament (MP) for Bridgnorth, holding the seat until 1831.

Whitmore died in 1846 at the age of 63. He had married Catherine Thomasson, daughter of Thomas Thomasson of York and had 3 sons and 3 daughters. Their son Thomas Charlton Whitmore was also MP for Bridgnorth.
