= Thomas Charlton Whitmore =

English politician (1807–1865)

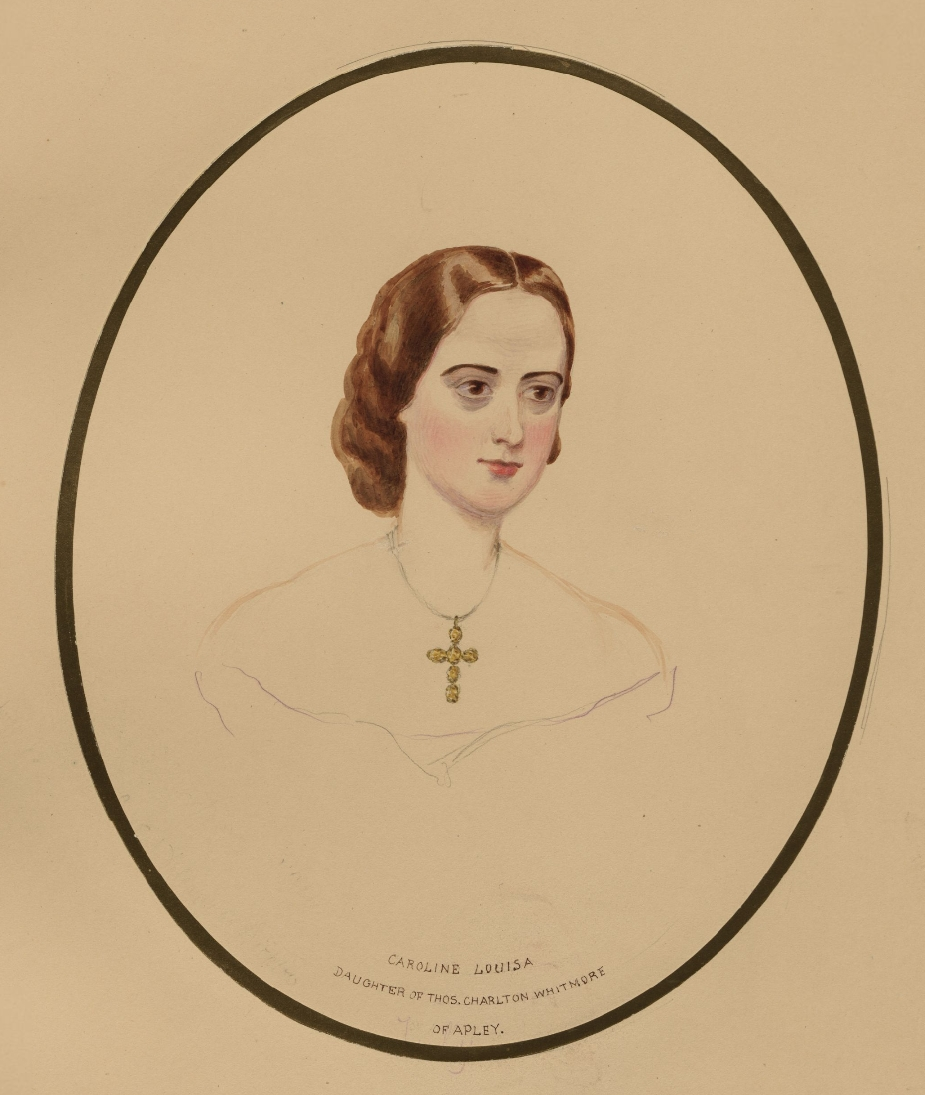
Lady Louisa Anne Douglas, daughter of Charles Douglas, 6th Marquess of Queensberry

Thomas Charlton Whitmore (5 January 1807 – 13 March 1865) was an English Conservative politician who sat in the House of Commons from 1832 to 1852.

Whitmore was the eldest son of Thomas Whitmore of Apley Park and his wife Catherine Thomasson. His father was M.P. for Bridgnorth from 1806 to 1831.

Whitmore married Lady Louisa Anne Douglas, daughter of Charles Douglas, 6th Marquess of Queensberry and Lady Caroline Scott, on 11 April 1833.

At the 1832 general election Whitmore was elected Member of Parliament for Bridgnorth. He held the seat until 1852. He was High Sheriff of Shropshire in 1863.

Whitmore vigorously opposed the construction of the Severn Valley Railway whose proposed route ran through the Apley Park estate, and was consequently involved in extensive legal battles with the Severn Valley Railway Company. The railway opened in 1862 after the Company agreed to pay Whitmore £14,000 compensation and £150 per acre for the land purchased, and also to provide a station to serve the estate.

Whitmore died in 1865 at the age of 58.
