= William Whitmore (died 1725) =

English politician (died 1725)

William Whitmore (c. 1681 – 24 May 1725) was an English Whig politician. He sat as MP of Bridgnorth from 1705 until 1710 and 1713 until his death on 24 May 1725.

He was the elder son of Richard Whitmore of Lower Slaughter, Gloucestershire and Anne, the daughter of Sir John Weld. He was matriculated at Christ Church, Oxford on 16 April 1698, at the age of 16. He inherited the Lower Slaughter estate from his father as a child and succeeded his cousin Sir William Whitmore, 2nd Baronet of Apley Hall, Shropshire in 1699.

He also followed in his cousin's footsteps as MP for Bridgnorth. He was a Whig and in 1710 lost the election to the Tory candidates, but was re-elected in 1713.

In 1707, he married Elizabeth Pope; her father Roger Pope (1668-1706) of Woolstaston, Shropshire was his first cousin through his mother.

He died on 24 May 1725 and a writ was ordered 31 May 1725. He was succeeded by his son Thomas.
