= Bridgnorth (constituency) =

Parliamentary constituency in the United Kingdom, 1868–1885

- Former borough constituency for the House of Commons
- County: Shropshire
- Major settlements: Bridgnorth

1295–1885
- Seats: 1295–1868:Two; 1868–1885: One
- Replaced by: Ludlow

Bridgnorth was a parliamentary borough in Shropshire which was represented in the House of Commons of England from 1295 until 1707, then in the House of Commons of Great Britain until 1800, and in the House of Commons of the Parliament of the United Kingdom from 1801 until its abolition in 1885.

It was represented by two burgesses until 1868, when it was reduced to one Member of Parliament (MP).

== Boundaries ==
According to the 1881 census, the borough of Bridgnorth comprised the parishes of Quatford, part of Quatt, St. Leonard and St Mary (in Bridgnorth town), Astley Abbotts, Eardingdon, Oldbury, Romsley and Tasley. This was smaller than the municipal borough, which only contained the first four.

== History ==
By the eighteenth century Bridgnorth had one of the widest franchises in England, consisting of "the burgesses and freement within and without the borough". There were more than a thousand voters in the contested elections of 1727, 1734 and 1741 although in 1920 it was noted as 700. Between 1661 and 1870 at least one of the MPs for Bridgnorth came from the Whitmore family.

== Members of Parliament ==
=== MPs 1295–1640 ===
MPs 1295-1640 — MPs 1640-1868 — MPs 1868-1885 — Elections — See also — Notes and references — Sources

Parliament	First member	Second member
1388 (Feb)	John Farnales	William Palmer I
1388 (Sep)	William Palmer I	William Goldsmith
1390 (Jan)	William Palmer I	John Farnales
1390 (Nov)		
1391	William Palmer I	Thomas Horde
1393	William Palmer I	John Farnales
1394	William Palmer I	John Farnales
1395	William Palmer I	John Farnales
1397 (Jan)	William Palmer I	John Blockley
1397 (Sep)		
1399	William Palmer I	Thomas Horde
1402	Hugh Harnage	John Bruyn
1404 (Jan)		
1404 (Oct)		
1406	Hugh Harnage	Walter Green
1407	Walter Green	John Cook
1410	... Lange	
1411	Thomas Hopton	Hugh Stanford
1413 (Feb)		
1413 (May)	Hugh Stanford	Thomas Green
1414 (Apr)	Richard Parlour	Thomas Odyes
1414 (Nov)	Richard Horde	Richard Parlour
1415		
1416 (Mar)	Richard Horde	Richard Parlour
1416 (Oct)		
1417	Richard Horde	Richard Parlour
1419	Richard Horde	Richard Parlour
1420	Richard Horde	William Stapeley
1421 (May)	Thomas Green	Robert Aylesbury
1421 (Dec)	Thomas Green	Richard Parlour
1425	John Bruyn	
1510-1523	No names known	
1529	Humphrey Goldston	George Hayward
1536	?	
1539	?	
1542	Edward Hall	William Grey
1545	Edward Hall	Henry Blount
1547	Roger Smith	John Pulley
1553 (Mar)	Ambrose Gilberd	Roger Smith
1553 (Oct)	Sir George Blount	Jerome Horde
1554 (Apr)	Jerome Horde	William Acton
1554 (Nov)	John Horde	Jerome Horde
1555	Jerome Horde	William Acton
1558	John Broke	Thomas Bromley
1559	Sir George Blount	Richard Prince
1562–3	John Broke	Edward Cordell
1571	Henry Townshend	Thomas Otley
1572	Henry Townshend	Thomas Seckford, died and replaced in 1580 by Edmund Molyneux
1584	Jerome Corbet	Walter Lee
1586	Edward Bromley	John Lutwich
1588	Edward Bromley	John Lutwich
1593	Edward Bromley	John Lutwich
1597	Edward Bromley	John Lutwich
1601	Thomas Horde	Edward Bromley
1604	Sir Lewis Lewknor	Edward Bromley, replaced by Francis Lacon
1614	John Pierse	Richard Singe
1621-1622	Sir John Hayward	William Whitmore
1624	Sir William Whitmore	George Smith
1625	Sir William Whitmore	George Vernon
1626	Sir Richard Shelton	George Vernon
1628-1629	Sir Richard Shelton	Sir George Paule
1629–1640	No Parliaments summoned	

Back to Members of Parliament

=== MPs 1640–1868 ===
Elected	First member	First party	Second member	Second party
April 1640	Edward Acton	Royalist	(Sir) Thomas Whitmore	
November 1640	Edward Acton	Royalist	(Sir) Thomas Whitmore	Royalist
February 1644	Acton and Whitmore disabled to sit - both seats vacant			
1646	Robert Clive		Robert Charlton	
December 1648	Clive and Charlton not recorded as sitting after Pride's Purge			
1653	Bridgnorth was unrepresented in the Barebones Parliament			
1654	William Crown		Bridgnorth had only one seat in the First and Second Parliaments of the Protectorate	
1656	Edmund Waring		Bridgnorth had only one seat in the First and Second Parliaments of the Protectorate	
January 1659	Edmund Waring		John Humphrys	
May 1659	Not represented in the restored Rump			
April 1660	Sir Walter Acton		John Bennet	
1661	Sir William Whitmore, Bt		John Bennet	
1663	Sir William Whitmore, Bt		Sir Thomas Whitmore	
1685	Sir William Whitmore, Bt		Roger Pope	
1689	Sir William Whitmore, Bt		Sir Edward Acton, Bt	Tory
1694	Roger Pope		Sir Edward Acton, Bt	Tory
1702	Sir Humphrey Brigges, Bt		Sir Edward Acton, Bt	Tory
1705	Sir Humphrey Brigges, Bt		William Whitmore	
1710	Whitmore Acton		Richard Cresswell	Tory
1713	William Whitmore		John Weaver	
1725	St John Charlton		John Weaver	
1734	Thomas Whitmore		Grey James Grove	
1741	Thomas Whitmore		William Whitmore	
1747	Thomas Whitmore		Arthur Weaver	
1754	Hon. John Grey		William Whitmore	
1768	The Lord Pigot		William Whitmore	
1771	The Lord Pigot		Thomas Whitmore	Tory
1778	Hugh Pigot	Whig	Thomas Whitmore	Tory
1784	Isaac Hawkins Browne	Tory	Thomas Whitmore	Tory
1795	Isaac Hawkins Browne	Tory	John Whitmore	Tory
1806	Isaac Hawkins Browne	Tory	Thomas Whitmore	Tory
1812	Hon. Charles Jenkinson	Tory	Thomas Whitmore	Tory
1818	Sir Thomas Tyrwhitt Jones	Tory	Thomas Whitmore	Tory
1820	William Wolryche-Whitmore	Whig	Thomas Whitmore	Tory
1831	William Wolryche-Whitmore	Whig	James Foster	Whig
1832	Robert Pigot	Tory	Thomas Charlton Whitmore	Tory
1834	Robert Pigot	Conservative	Thomas Charlton Whitmore	Conservative
1837	Henry Hanbury-Tracy	Whig	Thomas Charlton Whitmore	Conservative
1838 by-election	Sir Robert Pigot	Conservative	Thomas Charlton Whitmore	Conservative
1852	Sir Robert Pigot	Conservative	Henry Whitmore	Conservative
1853 by-election	John Pritchard	Conservative	Henry Whitmore	Conservative
1865	John Pritchard	Conservative	Sir John Dalberg-Acton, Bt	Liberal
1866	John Pritchard	Conservative	Henry Whitmore	Conservative
1868	Representation reduced to one Member			

Back to Members of Parliament

=== MPs 1868–1885 ===
Election	Member	Party
1868	Henry Whitmore	Conservative
1870 by-election	William Henry Foster	Liberal
1880	William Henry Foster	Conservative
1885	Constituency abolished under the Redistribution of Seats Act	

Back to Members of Parliament

== Elections ==
1830s – 1840s – 1850s – 1860s – 1870s – 1880s – See also – Notes and references – Sources

=== Elections in the 1830s ===
General election 1830: Bridgnorth (2 seats)
Party	Candidate	Votes	%	±%
Tory	Thomas Whitmore	721	41.0	
Whig	William Wolryche-Whitmore	669	38.0	
Tory	Richard Arkwright	369	21.0	
Turnout		986	1,759	
Majority		52	3.0	
Tory hold		Swing		
Majority		300	17.0	
Whig hold		Swing		

General election 1831: Bridgnorth (2 seats)
Party	Candidate	Votes	%	±%
Whig	William Wolryche-Whitmore	Unopposed		
Whig	James Foster	Unopposed		
Whig hold				
Whig gain from Tory				

General election 1832: Bridgnorth (2 seats)
Party	Candidate	Votes	%	±%
Tory	Robert Pigot	Unopposed		
Tory	Thomas Charlton Whitmore	Unopposed		
Registered electors		746		
Tory gain from Whig				
Tory gain from Whig				

General election 1835: Bridgnorth (2 seats)
Party	Candidate	Votes	%	±%
Conservative	Thomas Charlton Whitmore	490	38.7	N/A
Conservative	Robert Pigot	423	33.4	N/A
Whig	Henry Hanbury-Tracy	353	27.9	New
Majority		70	5.5	N/A
Turnout		698	88.2	N/A
Registered electors		791		
Conservative hold		Swing	N/A	
Conservative hold		Swing	N/A	

General election 1837: Bridgnorth (2 seats)
Party	Candidate	Votes	%	±%
Conservative	Thomas Charlton Whitmore	429	36.8	−1.9
Whig	Henry Hanbury-Tracy	371	31.8	+3.9
Conservative	Robert Pigot	367	31.4	−2.0
Turnout		727	92.0	+3.8
Registered electors		790		
Majority		58	5.0	−0.5
Conservative hold		Swing	−1.9	
Majority		4	0.4	N/A
Whig gain from Conservative		Swing	+3.9	

Hanbury-Tracy resigned, by accepting the office of Steward of the Chiltern Hundreds, after a petition was lodged against his election.

By-election, 20 February 1838: Bridgnorth
Party	Candidate	Votes	%	±%
Conservative	Robert Pigot	Unopposed		
Conservative gain from Whig				

=== Elections in the 1840s ===
General election 1841: Bridgnorth (2 seats)
Party	Candidate	Votes	%	±%
Conservative	Thomas Charlton Whitmore	496	39.3	+2.5
Conservative	Robert Pigot	475	37.6	+6.2
Whig	Frederick John Howard	225	17.8	+1.9
Whig	Nicholas Throckmorton	66	5.2	−10.7
Majority		250	19.8	+14.8
Turnout		703	86.8	−5.2
Registered electors		810		
Conservative hold		Swing	+3.5	
Conservative gain from Whig		Swing	+5.3	

General election 1847: Bridgnorth (2 seats)
Party	Candidate	Votes	%	±%
Conservative	Thomas Charlton Whitmore	611	44.7	+8.4
Conservative	Robert Pigot	388	28.4	−9.2
Radical	John Easthope	368	26.9	+3.9
Majority		20	1.5	−18.3
Turnout		684 (est)	81.6 (est)	−5.2
Registered electors		838		
Conservative hold		Swing	+3.2	
Conservative hold		Swing	−5.6	

Back to Elections

=== Elections in the 1850s ===
General election 1852: Bridgnorth (2 seats)
Party	Candidate	Votes	%	±%
Conservative	Henry Whitmore	443	40.8	−3.9
Conservative	Robert Pigot	360	33.1	+4.7
Whig	Frederick William Cadogan	283	26.1	−0.8
Majority		77	7.0	+5.5
Turnout		685 (est)	95.5 (est)	+13.9
Registered electors		717		
Conservative hold		Swing	−1.8	
Conservative hold		Swing	+2.6	

Pigot's election was declared void on petition due to bribery, causing a by-election.

By-election, 22 March 1853: Bridgnorth
Party	Candidate	Votes	%	±%
Conservative	John Pritchard	Unopposed		
Conservative hold				

General election 1857: Bridgnorth (2 seats)
Party	Candidate	Votes	%	±%
Conservative	Henry Whitmore	Unopposed		
Conservative	John Pritchard	Unopposed		
Registered electors		678		
Conservative hold				
Conservative hold				

Whitmore was appointed a Lord Commissioner of the Treasury, requiring a by-election.

By-election, 3 March 1858: Bridgnorth
Party	Candidate	Votes	%	±%
Conservative	Henry Whitmore	Unopposed		
Conservative hold				

General election 1859: Bridgnorth (2 seats)
Party	Candidate	Votes	%	±%
Conservative	Henry Whitmore	Unopposed		
Conservative	John Pritchard	Unopposed		
Registered electors		708		
Conservative hold				
Conservative hold				

Back to Elections

=== Elections in the 1860s ===
General election 1865: Bridgnorth (2 seats)
Party	Candidate	Votes	%	±%
Conservative	John Pritchard	299	34.1	N/A
Liberal	John Dalberg-Acton	289	33.0	New
Conservative	Henry Whitmore	288	32.9	N/A
Turnout		583 (est)	94.9 (est)	N/A
Registered electors		614		
Majority		10	1.1	N/A
Conservative hold		Swing	N/A	
Majority		1	0.1	N/A
Liberal gain from Conservative		Swing	N/A	

On 22 March 1866, after scrutiny, Dalberg-Acton was unseated and Whitmore was duly elected in his place.

Whitmore was then appointed a Lord Commissioner of the Treasury, requiring a by-election.

By-election, 21 Jul 1866: Bridgnorth (1 seat)
Party	Candidate	Votes	%	±%
Conservative	Henry Whitmore	Unopposed		
Conservative hold				

The seat was reduced to one member for the 1868 election.

General election 1868: Bridgnorth
Party	Candidate	Votes	%	±%
Conservative	Henry Whitmore	548	52.4	−14.6
Liberal	John Dalberg-Acton	497	47.6	+14.6
Majority		51	4.8	+3.7
Turnout		1,045	81.7	−13.2
Registered electors		1,279		
Conservative hold		Swing	−14.6	

Back to Elections

=== Elections in the 1870s ===
Whitmore resigned, causing a by-election.

By-election, 16 Feb 1870: Bridgnorth
Party	Candidate	Votes	%	±%
Liberal	William Henry Foster	Unopposed		
Liberal gain from Conservative				

General election 1874: Bridgnorth
Party	Candidate	Votes	%	±%
Liberal	William Henry Foster	701	71.8	+24.2
Conservative	George Barbour	275	28.2	−24.2
Majority		426	43.6	N/A
Turnout		976	77.0	−4.7
Registered electors		1,267		
Liberal gain from Conservative		Swing	+24.2	

Back to Elections

=== Elections in the 1880s ===
General election 1880: Bridgnorth
Party	Candidate	Votes	%	±%
Conservative	William Henry Foster	641	66.6	+38.4
Liberal	Edward Reid Vyvyan	321	33.4	−38.4
Majority		320	33.2	N/A
Turnout		962	78.6	+1.6
Registered electors		1,224		
Conservative gain from Liberal		Swing	+38.4	

Back to Elections

== See also ==
- Parliamentary constituencies in Shropshire#Historical constituencies
- List of former United Kingdom Parliament constituencies
- Unreformed House of Commons

== Sources ==
- Robert Beatson, A Chronological Register of Both Houses of Parliament (London: Longman, Hurst, Res & Orme, 1807)
- D Brunton & D H Pennington, Members of the Long Parliament (London: George Allen & Unwin, 1954)
- Cobbett's Parliamentary history of England, from the Norman Conquest in 1066 to the year 1803 (London: Thomas Hansard, 1808)
- David Hayton, 'The Country Party in the House of Commons 1698-1699', Parliamentary History, volume 6 (1987), 141-63
- Craig, F. W. S. (1989) [1977]. British parliamentary election results 1832–1885 (2nd ed.). Chichester: Parliamentary Research Services. pp. 59–60. ISBN 0-900178-26-4.
- Leigh Rayment's Historical List of MPs – Constituencies beginning with "B" (part 5)
