= Henrietta Paulet, Duchess of Bolton =

English aristocrat (c.1682 - 1729/1730)

Her Grace The Duchess of Bolton
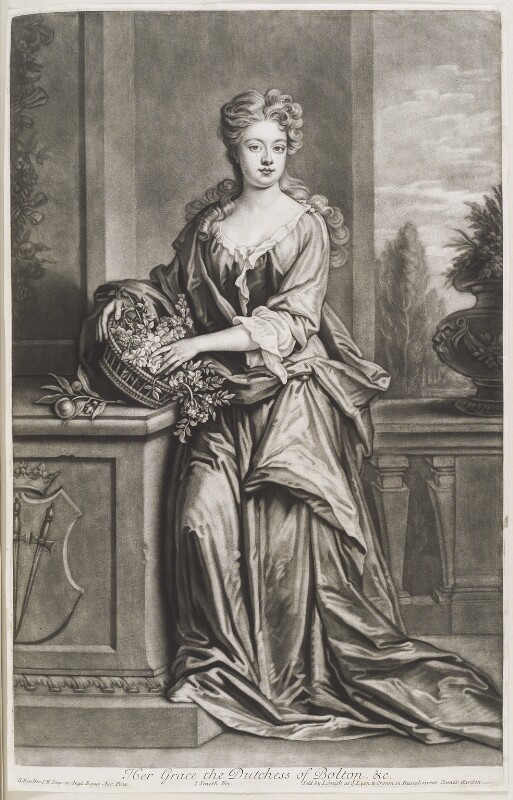
- Henrietta, Duchess of Bolton, as published by John Smith, after Sir Godfrey Kneller, Bt. Mezzotint, (c. 1700)
- Born: Henrietta Crofts c. 1682
- Died: 27 February 1730 (aged 47–48)
- Resting place: Basing House
- Spouse: Charles Paulet, 2nd Duke of Bolton (m. 1697; died 1722)
- Children: Lord Nassau Powlett
- Parents: James Scott, 1st Duke of Monmouth; Eleanor Needham
- Relatives: Charles II of England (grandfather); Jane Myddelton (aunt)

Henrietta Paulet, Duchess of Bolton (née Crofts; c. 1682 – 27 February 1730), was the third wife of Charles Paulet, 2nd Duke of Bolton. She was the elder daughter of James Scott, 1st Duke of Monmouth by one of his mistresses, and the niece of Jane Myddelton. Henrietta served as a Lady of the Bedchamber to Caroline of Ansbach in the 1710s. She was one of several aristocratic female signatories who petitioned King George II for the creation of a Foundling Hospital in the 1720s and 1730s, but she did not live long enough to see its creation. She spend part of her life in Dublin, and the city's Henrietta Street is reputedly named after her.

== Early life ==
The elder daughter of James Scott, 1st Duke of Monmouth, by his mistress Eleanor Needham, Henrietta took the surname of "Crofts" that had been assumed by her father when he was in the care of the Crofts baronets. Her mother's sister, Jane Myddelton, was one of the celebrated Windsor Beauties.

== Personal life ==
Henrietta married the Duke of Bolton in Dublin in about 1697, some years after the death of his second wife, Frances. She was around twenty years his junior, and he was known in society as ‘a most lewd, vicious man, a great dissembler and a very hard drinker’. They had one son:

- Lord Nassau Powlett (1698-1741), who married Isabella Tufton c.1730, daughter of Thomas Tufton, 6th Earl of Thanet, and had one daughter.

Henrietta died in 1730, leaving no will, and was buried on 10 March of that year at Basing House. Some believe Henrietta Street in Dublin was named after her, as it intersects with Bolton Street, named after her husband, although some think it is named after Henrietta FitzRoy, Duchess of Grafton.

=== Court life ===
From 1714 to 1718, the duchess was a Lady of the Bedchamber to the Princess of Wales, Caroline of Ansbach.

In 1716, following the Jacobite Rebellion of 1715, Henrietta unsuccessfully interceded, with King George I on behalf of her friend Anna Radclyffe, Countess of Derwentwater, whose husband, James, 3rd Earl of Derwentwater, was condemned to death for his role in the rebellion.

She was one of the aristocratic female signatories to Thomas Coram's 1730 petition to establish the Foundling Hospital, which was presented to King George II in 1735. She signed the petition on 25 April 1729, and Gillian Wagner suggests that the Bolton family members may have signed as a result of their 'personal experience of illegitimacy in the family'. Wagner also suggests that the Dowager Duchess signed with the encouragement of her step-daughter-in-law Anne, who had signed Coram's petition three days earlier, on 22 April 1729.

Her portrait, by Sir Godfrey Kneller, is held by the Art Gallery of South Australia; the Royal Collection has a mezzotint copy and a watercolour miniature.
