= Thomas Whitmore (died 1682) =

English courtier (1639–1682)

- Born: 1642
- Died: 1682 (aged 39–40)
- Spouse: Frances, Lady Whitmore
- Children: Frances, Elizabeth, Dorothy
- Parents: Sir Thomas Whitmore, 1st Baronet (father); Elizabeth Acton (mother)

Sir Thomas Whitmore (1642–1682) was an English courtier.

== Biography ==
Thomas Whitmore was born in 1642, the second son of Sir Thomas Whitmore, 1st Baronet and Elizabeth Acton. He was the younger brother of Sir William Whitmore, 2nd Baronet.

He was admitted to the Middle Temple with his brother in December 1652 and entered Queen's College, Cambridge in April 1657. In 1663 he joined his elder brother in representing Bridgnorth in parliament, although he was largely inactive. A supporter of the Court, in 1669 he was appointed a gentlemen of the Privy chamber.

By May 1665 he had married Frances (d. 1690), daughter of William Brooke by his second wife Penelope Hill, with whom he had three children:

- Frances Whitmore, who became one of Godfrey Kneller's Hampton Court Beauties,
- Elizabeth (d, 1667)
- Dorothy (d. 1688) married Jonathan Langley esq. of Shrewsbury Abbey.

He is sometimes referred to as Thomas Whitmore of Buildwas, part of the estate of his maternal grandfather. His London home was in St Paul's Covent Garden, where he died and was buired in May 1682.
