= Frances Whitmore =

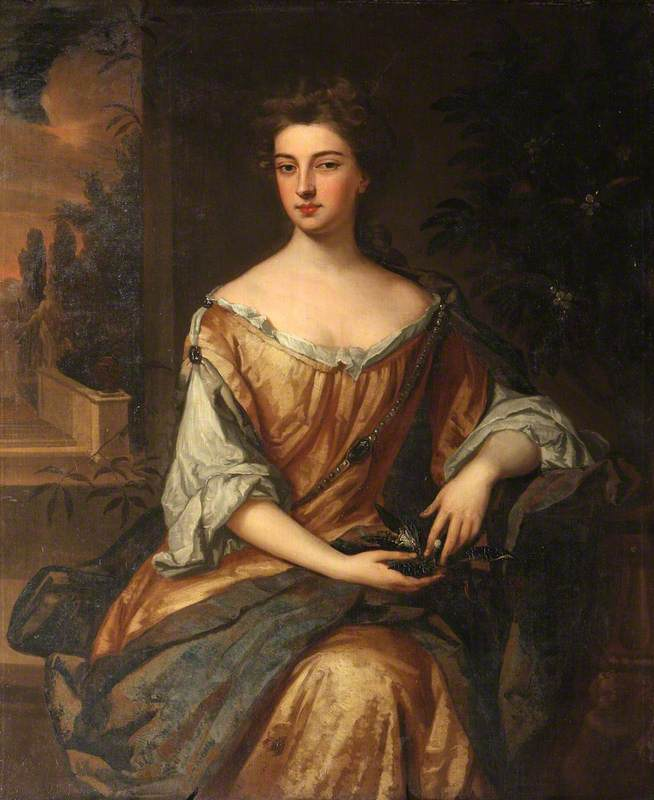
Godfrey Kneller's painting of Frances Whitmore in the Hampton Court Beauties series

Frances Myddleton, Lady Myddleton née Whitmore (1666–1695) was an English courtier. Frances was one of the Hampton Court Beauties painted by Sir Godfrey Kneller for Queen Mary II. She was styled Dame Frances Myddelton.

== Family ==
She was the daughter and co-heir of Sir Thomas Whitmore (c.1642-1682), younger son of Sir Thomas Whitmore, 1st Baronet, and Hon. Frances Brooke (1640–1690), one of Lely's Windsor Beauties.

In 1679 a marriage licence was granted for her marriage to her cousin William Whitmore of Balmes, Hackney, London. He was killed by the 'accidental discharge of a pistol' before coming of age; there were no children of the marriage.

She married Sir Richard Myddelton, 3rd Baronet (1655–1716) in 1685. They had three children:

- Frances Myddelton (d.1693),
- Mary Myddelton (1688–1747),
- Sir William Myddelton, 4th Baronet (1694–1718).

== Other ==
As one of the Hampton Court Beauties, Frances Myddelton (Nee Whitmore) was known as Lady Myddelton, coincidentally, her husband's aunt is the Mrs Myddelton of the Windsor Beauties and her own mother is Lady Whitmore of the Windsor Beauties.
