= Moyses Hill =

English knight and army officer (died 1630)

Sir Moyses Hill (often written as Sir Moses Hill) (died February 1629-30) was an English army officer who served in Ireland and later settled in Ulster. He was the governor of Olderfleet Castle, mareschal of Carrickfergus, provost mareschal of Ulster, and represented County Antrim in the Irish parliament of 1613.

Moyses arrived in Ireland in 1573 as part of the Earl of Essex, Walter Devereux's army to subdue or colonize Ulster.

In 1597 he was present at the Battle of Carrickfergus. He was appointed the governor of Olderfleet Castle and knighted in 1603. In 1611, he was given possession of the village of Cromlin (now Hillsborough). The position of Provost Mareschal of the Province of Ulster was created for him in 1617. He was granted 2,000 acres in County Antrim and 40,000 acres in County Down for his services to the Crown.

He died in February 1629–30.

== Family ==
He married, firstly, Alice MacDonnell, sister of Sorley Boy MacDonnell, daughter of Alexander MacDonnell, Lord of Islay and Kintyre, and Catherine MacDonald. Their children were:

- Mary Hill, married Sir James Craige of Carrickfergus.
- Penelope Hill, married firstly Arthur Wilmot, son of Charles Wilmot, 1st Viscount Wilmot; secondly Sir William Brooke, and had issue, including the celebrated beauty Margaret, Lady Denham and Hon. Frances Brooke; and thirdly Hon. Edward Russell, and had further issue, including the leading Whig statesman Edward Russell, 1st Earl of Orford. Penelope died in July 1694
- Frances Hill, married Colonel Thomas Coote.
- Peter Hill (died 1644)

He married, secondly, Anne Grogan and had issue:

- Arthur Hill (died April 1663)
