= Margaret, Lady Denham =

English courtier

Lady Denham
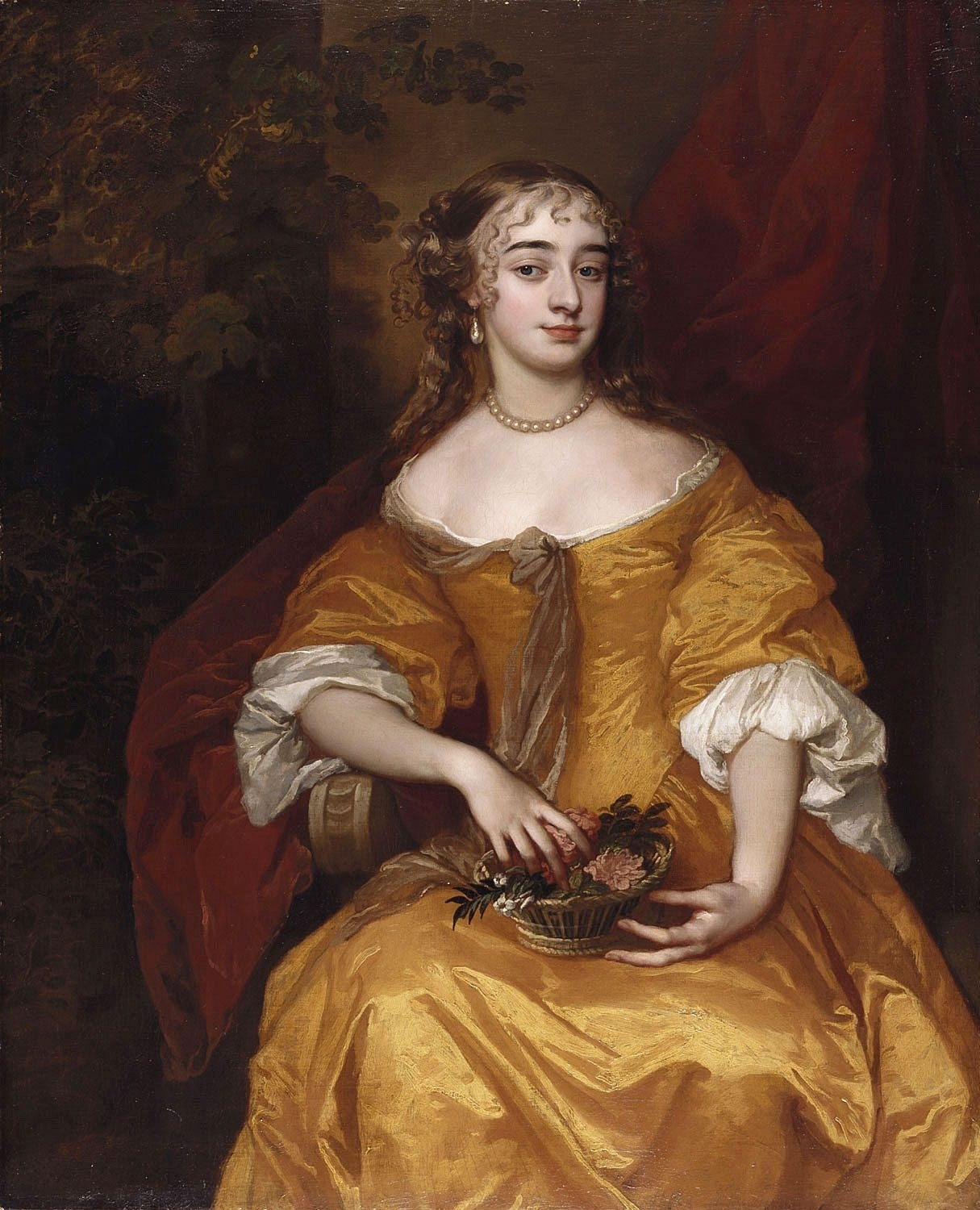
- Portrait by Lely in the Windsor Beauties.
- Born: 1640
- Died: 1666 (aged 25–26)
- Spouse: John Denham
- Parents: William Brooke (father); Penelope Hill (mother)

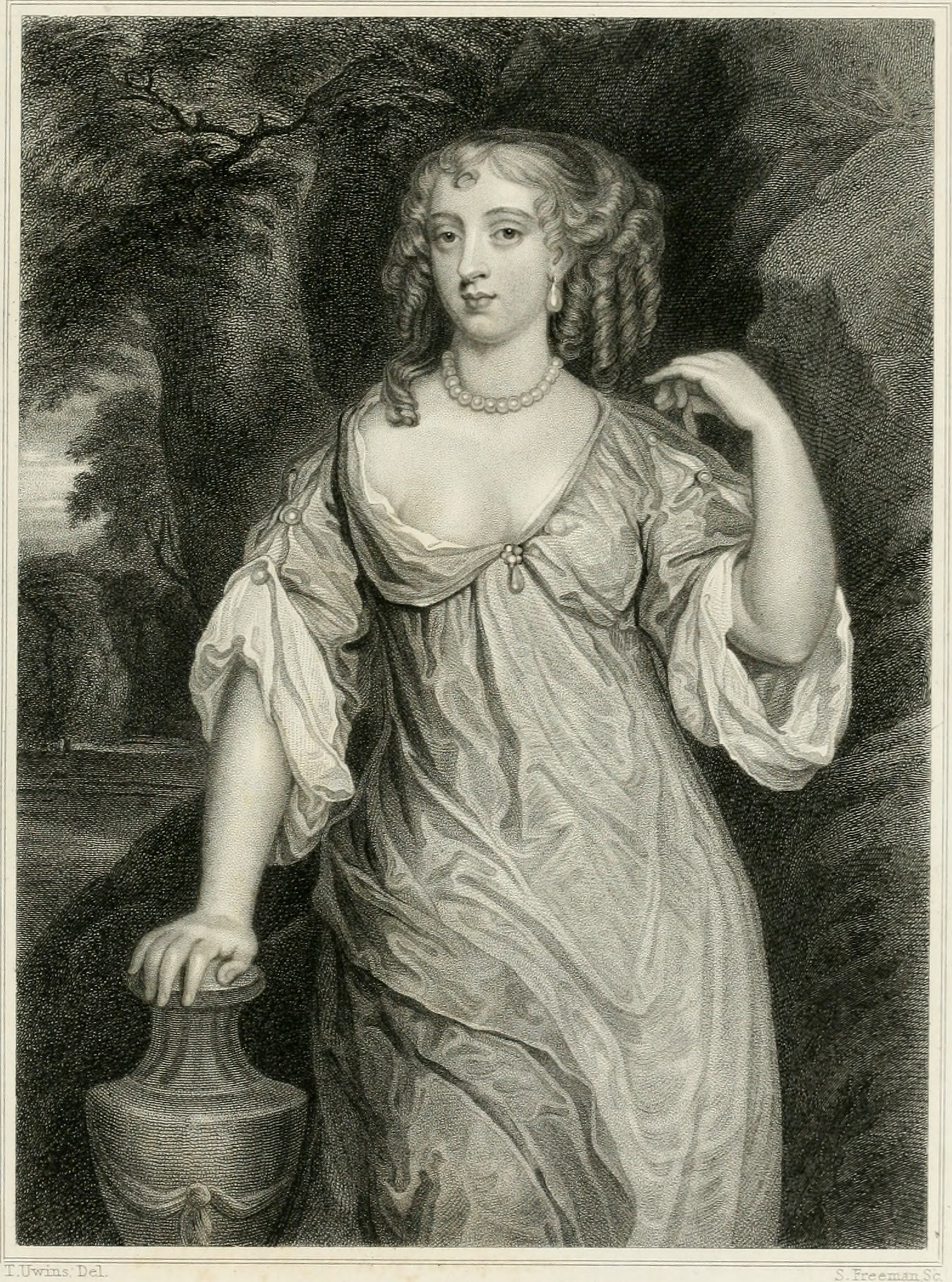
Original portrait by Sir Peter Lely in the Gallery of Althorp

Margaret, Lady Denham (c. 1642 – January 1667), formerly the Honourable Margaret Brooke, was an English courtier during the reign of King Charles II of England and was one of the "Windsor Beauties" painted by Sir Peter Lely. She was a mistress of the future King James II of England.

Margaret ("Elizabeth" in some sources) was the third daughter of Sir William Brooke, MP (1601–1643), and his second wife Penelope Hill. Her sister was another of the Windsor Beauties, the Hon. Frances Brooke. In 1665, she married the MP and poet John Denham, who was about thirty years older than her. While at court she began an affair with James, Duke of York, embarrassing her husband by consorting publicly with James, whose wife (the former Anne Hyde) had commissioned Lely to paint the Windsor Beauties.

When Lady Denham became seriously ill, suspicion fell on her husband. Samuel Pepys was one of those who repeated the rumour that Denham had poisoned his wife. Other suspects included both the Duke and Duchess of York, and James's sister-in-law, Henrietta Hyde. Following Lady Denham's death, James declared that he would never publicly acknowledge another mistress.
