= Irish Convention (1660) =

Protestant representative assembly in Ireland in 1660

The Irish Convention was an Irish representative assembly which met in Dublin several times in early 1660, immediately prior to the Stuart Restoration, and again in January 1661. The Convention sought to represent Protestant interests in Ireland, including the restoration of the monarchy and episcopacy, and also the right for the King's Irish Parliament to tax and legislate for itself, rejecting claims of legislative supremacy by the English Parliament.

== Background ==
By the end of 1659, the Commonwealth of England appeared to be drifting into anarchy, with widespread demands for new elections and an end to military rule. Two factions emerged; the supporters of the reinstalled Rump Parliament and the more radical Republican faction led by General John Lambert. When the English general George Monck declared his support for the Rump, in December 1659 influential Old Protestant figures in Ireland led by Sir Charles Coote and Lord Broghill decided launch a coup d'état against the radical Commonwealth authorities and in support of Monck. Monck's former colleague, Sir Theophilus Jones, seized Dublin Castle while other garrisons across the island were also secured.

In February 1660, Monck enabled the readmittance of English members of the Long Parliament excluded by Pride's Purge, but this did not settle the political and constitutional problem in Ireland by failing to restore the Parliament of Ireland. As a result, Coote decided to call a 'General Convention' in Ireland to discuss a new constitutional settlement and to petition the parliament in London.

== The Irish Convention ==
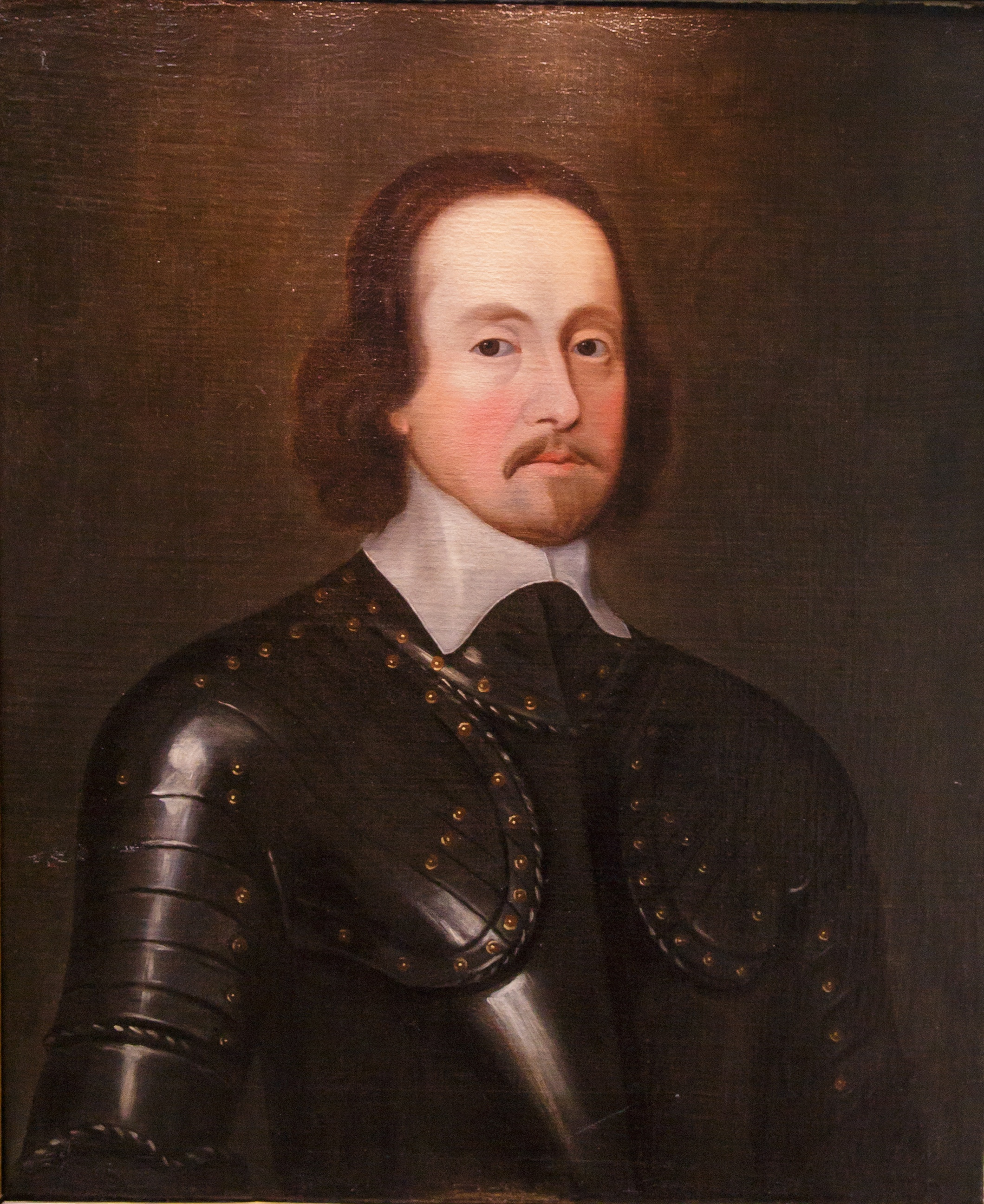
Sir Charles Coote was a leading figure in the Irish Convention of 1660 and led calls for the restoration of the Stuart monarchy in Ireland

The new unicameral body met in Dublin on 27 February 1660 but promptly adjourned in order to facilitate wider representation from across Ireland. A full complement of 158 representatives then reassembled in Dublin on 2 March; all were Protestant. The convention's leaders were eager to ensure that it was not perceived as a parliamentary body; the Convention met at the Four Courts rather than the former meeting place of Ireland's parliament at Dublin Castle, and it elected a chairman rather than a speaker. Nonetheless, its members had been elected to represent Ireland's traditional constituencies, although most seats returned one member rather than the customary two representatives. Many members of the convention had served in English parliaments under The Protectorate. Notable members included Coote, Broghill, Jones, Sir John Clotworthy, John Temple, and Arthur Hill. Although the Old Protestants dominated the assembly, providing two thirds of the delegates, there was also a significant number of representatives from among the Protestant soldiers who had settled in Ireland following the Cromwellian conquest of 1649 to 1653.

The primary aim of the convention was to influence events in England and ensure that Ireland was not ignored in any new political settlement. The first business of the convention was to prepare a declaration, which was published on 8 March. This document asserted Ireland's right to self-determination under an Irish Parliament, empowered to decide taxation in Ireland, and the desire to establish a national Protestant church. The convention also declared, however, that "the welfare and interest of England and Ireland are so inseparably interwoven as the good or evil of either must necessarily become common to both".

Later in March, the English Council of State, suspicious of developments in Dublin, appointed commissioners to re-establish control over Irish affairs. With the restoration of the monarchy appearing more likely, Coote and Broghill began making private approaches to the still-exiled Charles II. Coote sought to move the Convention towards restoration of the monarchy, but Broghill did not openly declare for the King until May 1660. On 1 May, the General Convention voted to disband, and issued a declaration denouncing the regicide of 1649 and requesting that Charles call a parliament consisting of Protestant peers and commons. On 14 May, the convention's chairman, Barry, issued a proclamation from Dublin in the name of the General Convention of Ireland, for proclaiming "his Sacred Royal Majesty King Charles the Second" in order to formally recognise the soon-to-be restored king.

Following the Stuart Restoration, the General Convention was summoned by royal letter to meet again on 22 January 1661. It was thereafter formally dissolved by Charles II, who summoned a new Irish Parliament in May 1661. This remained the legislature of the Kingdom of Ireland until the Acts of Union 1800.
