= Arthur Hill (Anglo-Irish soldier) =

Anglo-Irish landowner, soldier and politician

The Right Honourable Arthur Hill
- Born: c.1600 County Down, Kingdom of Ireland
- Died: April 1663; Hillsborough, County Down, Kingdom of Ireland
- Spouse(s): Anne Bolton (1), Mary Parsons (2)
- Relatives: Sir Moyses Hill (father)
- Military career
- Allegiance: Kingdom of Ireland (before 1644); English Parliamentarians (1644–1649); English Commonwealth (1649–1660); Kingdom of Ireland (1660–1663)
- Rank: Colonel
- Conflicts: Irish Confederate Wars; Irish Rebellion of 1641

Colonel Arthur Hill PC(I) (c.1600 – April 1663) was an Anglo-Irish landowner, soldier and politician, who led Protestant settler forces during the Irish Rebellion of 1641 and held influential appointments in the Dublin Castle administration. He was a strong advocate of the Protestant Ascendancy in Ireland and founded the current settlement of Hillsborough in County Down during the Plantation of Ulster.

== Biography ==
=== Early life and the Irish rebellion ===
Hill was the second son of Sir Moyses Hill of Hill Hall, County Down, and Alice Hill (née McDonnell). Following the death of his elder brother, Peter, Hill became his father's heir. By the 1630s, Hill was established as one of the greatest landowners in Ulster. This included a plantation near Belfast which Hill leased from Lord Chichester and brought an annual income of £1,000. He was also active in buying and leasing land in Kilwarlin, Cromlyn and Iveagh. Alongside his friend and kinsman, Sir George Rawdon, 1st Baronet, Hill was a strong supporter of the Church of Ireland. In 1637, Hill was one of three trustees of the corporation of Carrickfergus.

Following the outbreak of the Irish Rebellion of 1641, he became a leading figure in the defence of local Protestant communities, despite his lack of military experience. In 1642, he travelled to Westminster to lobby the Long Parliament on behalf of Ulster settlers and was made a colonel of horse. In November 1642 and April 1643, Hill was granted a warrant by parliament to attend Charles I at his wartime court in Oxford, in an attempt to persuade the king to support the suppression of the Irish rebels. By the end of 1644, Hill had successfully lobbied parliament to secure much-needed supplies for the Protestant garrison towns. In the summer of 1645, Hill was again in Westminster to advise parliament on the war in Ireland, and he thereafter remained in London as an agent for the Protestant settler officers until the autumn of 1648.

=== Official under the Commonwealth ===
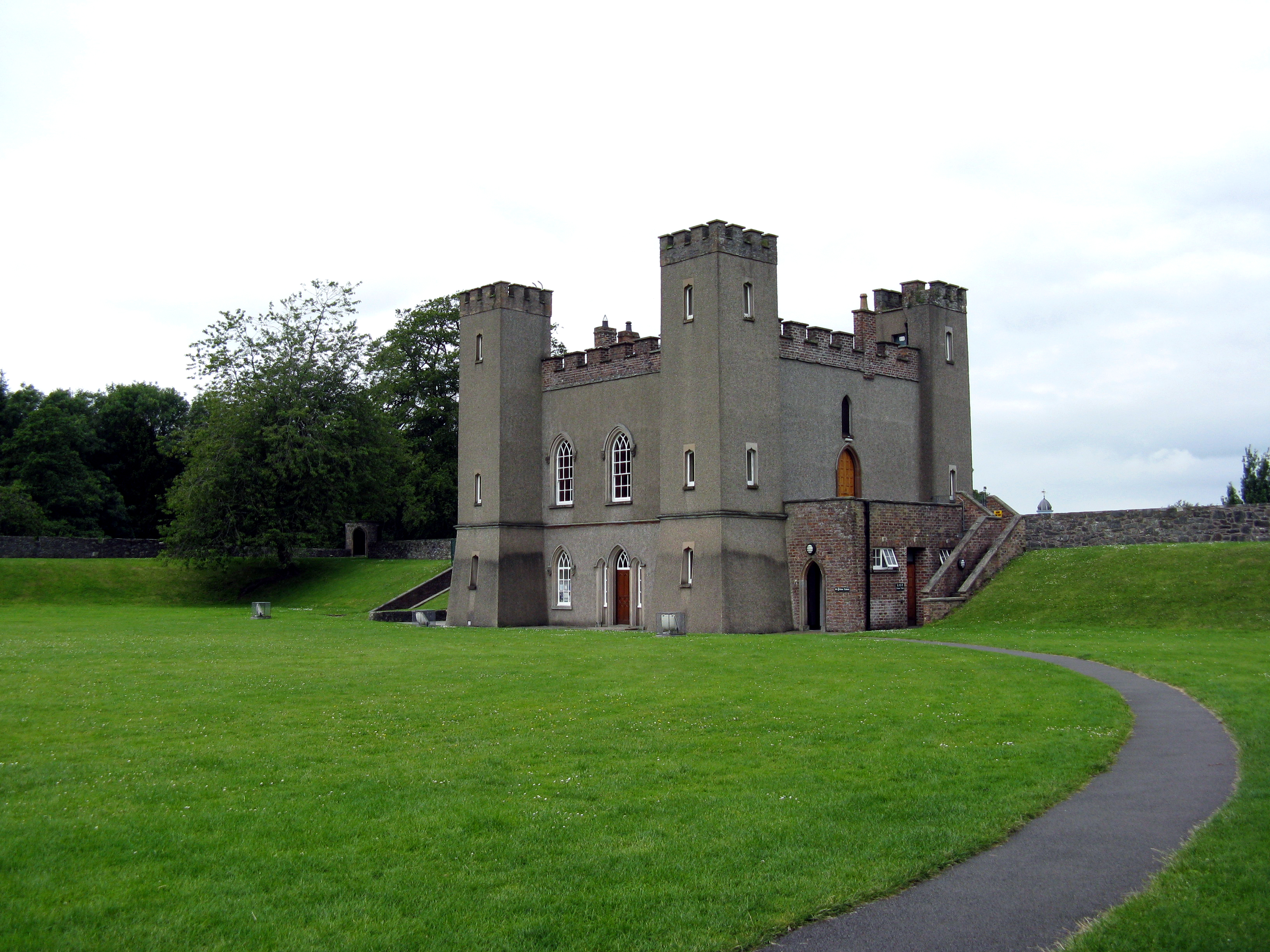
Hillsborough Fort, built by Hill in 1650, became a royal garrison in 1660

Under the Commonwealth government, Hill received a salary as a secretary to the English Council of State's committee on Irish affairs during the Cromwellian conquest of Ireland. Hill was able to use this position to secure the repayment of sums he had incurred during the Irish rebellion, including £8,000 for expenses and £5,000 for his military arrears. In November 1650, he returned to Ulster and was appointed a revenue commissioner. He also undertook the construction of Hillsborough Fort, named in honour of his family, to command the road leading from Dublin to Belfast and Carrickfergus. Despite his affinity with the Roundhead cause, Hill used his growing influence to protect former royalists like Viscount Conway and Marcus Trevor from sequestration.

In August 1654, Hill was elected as a Member of Parliament for County Down, County Antrim and County Armagh in the First Protectorate Parliament. He became an increasingly powerful figure in Irish affairs under The Protectorate, sitting on the Council of State's trade committee from January 1656 and advising Henry Cromwell in Dublin between 1657 and 1658. Redistributing land seized from Catholic and royalist landowners under the Act for the Settlement of Ireland 1652, in 1657, Cromwell granted Hill 3,000 acres of land in County Down "for services done in Ireland". Hill avoided involvement in the December 1659 coup in Dublin against the Protectorate, but in 1660 remained one of the foremost figures in Irish politics after Sir Charles Coote and Lord Broghill, and was elected to attend the Irish Convention of that year.

=== Following the Restoration ===
Despite his tacit support for the Cromwellian administration, after the Stuart Restoration in 1660, Hill received many favours from the restored royalist regime. On the recommendation of the Duke of Ormond, in December 1660 Hill was made Constable of Hillsborough Fort, which became a royal garrison, and he was made a member of the Privy Council of Ireland. The position of constable became hereditary in the Hill family. In January 1661, he was officially pardoned by Charles II, and most of the Cromwellian land grants to Hill were confirmed by the Act of Settlement 1662. Hill was returned to the reestablished Irish House of Commons as the member of parliament for County Down in 1661, and around that time also founded the present settlement at Hillsborough, complete with a new Anglican church built in 1662. In December 1662 the new settlement was granted a Royal charter.

=== Personal life ===
Hill was married twice; first to Anne, a daughter of Sir Richard Bolton and, after her death, to Mary, the daughter of Sir William Parsons, 1st Baronet of Bellamont. He died in April 1663 and succeeded by his son and heir by his first marriage, Moyses Hill. Moyses died the following year and was succeeded by his half-brother from Hill's second marriage, William Hill. He was an ancestor of Trevor Hill, 1st Viscount Hillsborough and therefore the Marquesses of Downshire and Barons Sandys.

Hill was a friend and supporter of the agriculturalist Robert Child. Child eventually settled on Hill's estate in Ulster from 1651.

Parliament of Ireland
Preceded by Third Protectorate Parliament	Member of Parliament for County Down; 1661–1663; With: Vere Essex Cromwell (1661–1662); Marcus Trevor (1662–1663)	Succeeded by Vere Essex Cromwell; Marcus Trevor
