= Frances, Lady Whitmore =

Frances Brooke
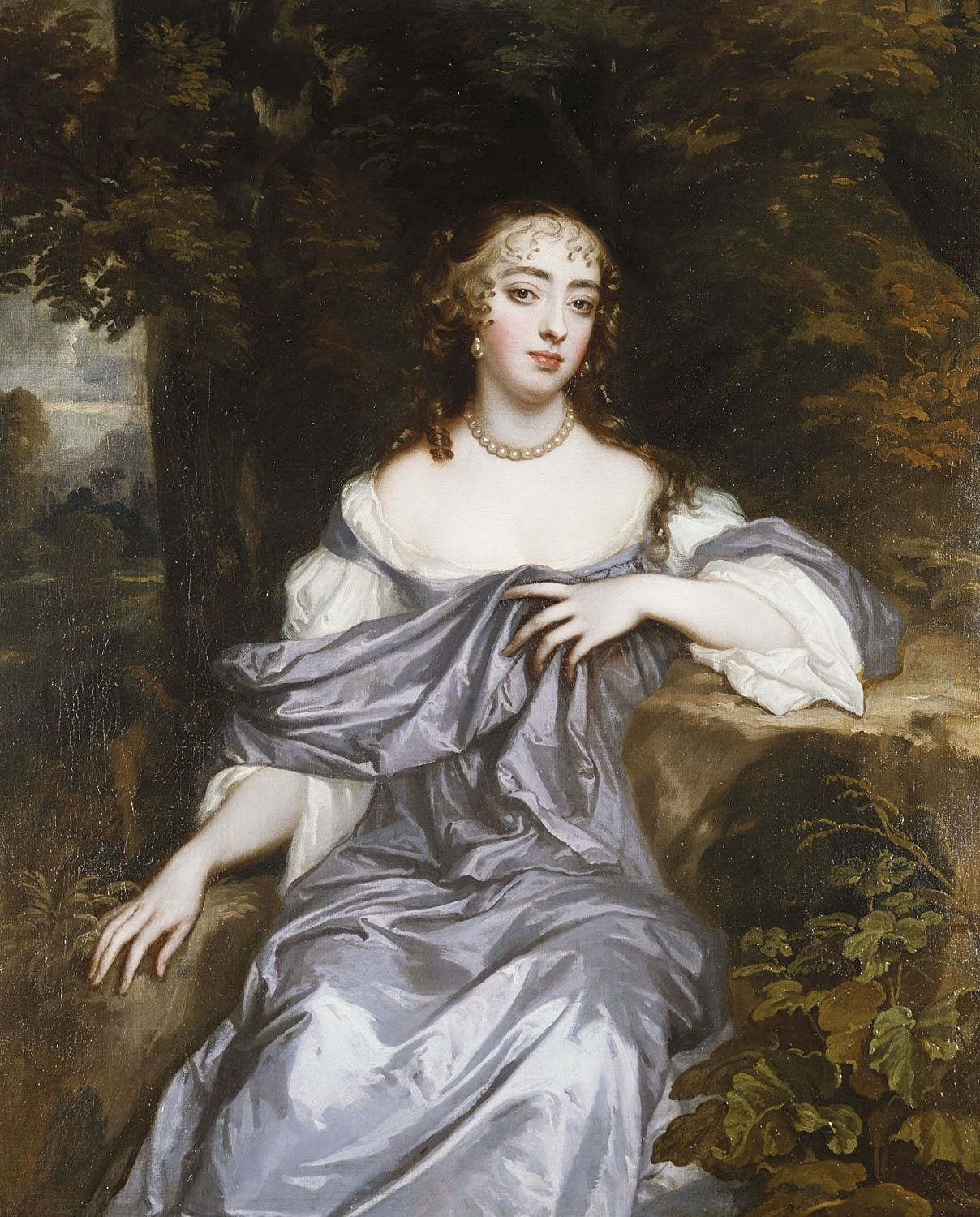
- Portrait by Lely in the Windsor Beauties.
- Born: 1640
- Died: 1690 (aged 49–50)
- Spouse(s): Thomas Whitmore; Matthew Harvey
- Children: Frances, Elizabeth, Dorothy
- Parents: William Brooke (father); Penelope Hill (mother)

Frances, Lady Whitmore (née Brooke; 1640–1690) was an English courtier and was one of the "Windsor Beauties" painted by Sir Peter Lely.

== Biography ==
Frances Brooke was born in 1640 to William Brooke and his second wife Penelope Hill. Her younger sister, Margaret, was another of the Windsor Beauties. Following her mother's remarriage, she became a niece of George Digby, 2nd Earl of Bristol. Frances and Margaret were regular attendees at the evening entertainments devised by the earl to entertain Charles II. Reportedly, 'they were both formed by nature to excite love; in others, as well as to be susceptible of it themselves; they were just what the king wanted'.

By May 1665 she was married to Sir Thomas Whitmore, younger son Sir Thomas Whitmore, 1st Baronet. There were three children from this marriage:

- Frances Whitmore, who became one of Godfrey Kneller's Hampton Court Beauties,
- Elizabeth (d, 1667)
- Dorothy (d. 1688) married Jonathan Langley esq. of Shrewsbury Abbey.

Following the death of her first husband in 1682, she quickly remarried. Her second husband, Matthew Harvey (1639-1694), was the younger brother of Eliab who had married her first husband's sister Dorothy. There were no children from this marriage. Frances was buried at Twickenham on 15 May 1690.
