= Jane Myddelton =

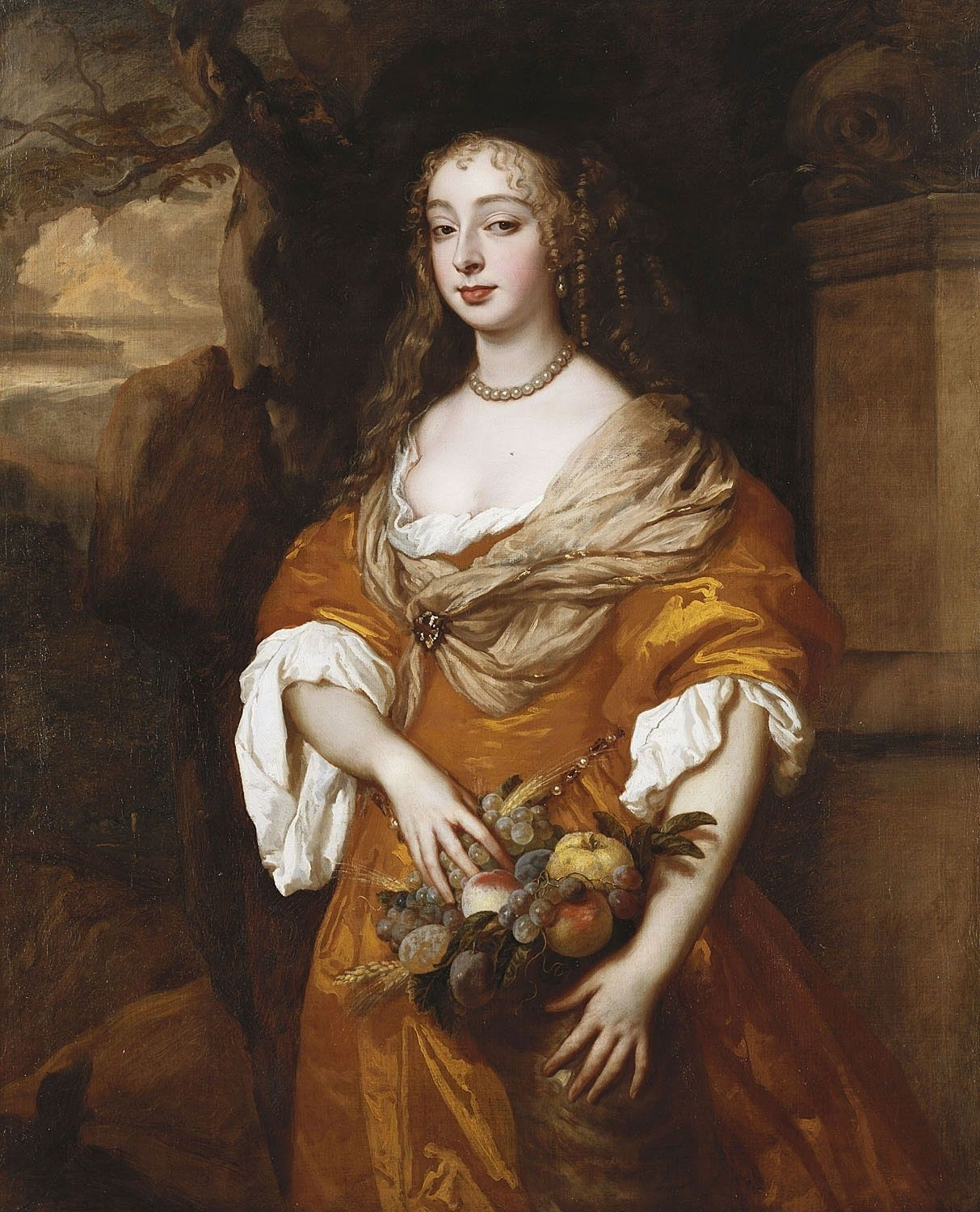
- Jane Myddelton, portrait by Peter Lely, 1663–5, painted for Anne, Duchess of York
- Born: Jane Needham; 1645
- Died: 1692 (aged 46–47)
- Other name: Jane Middleton
- Known for: One of the Windsor Beauties
- Spouse: Charles Myddelton (m. 1660; died 1691)
- Children: Jane Myddelton
- Parent(s): Sir Robert Needham; Jane Cockayne
- Relatives: Henrietta Paulet, Duchess of Bolton (niece); Robert Needham, 1st Viscount Kilmorey (granduncle)

Jane Myddelton or Middleton (née Needham; 1645–1692), was a reputed English beauty of the Restoration period, one of the Windsor Beauties. Thomas Seccombe in the Dictionary of National Biography described celebrated portraits as "representing a soft and slightly torpid type of blonde loveliness, with voluptuous figure, full lips, auburn hair, and dark hazel eyes".

== Life ==
Daughter of Sir Robert Needham (d. 1661), a nephew of Robert Needham, 1st Viscount Kilmorey, and his second wife, Jane, daughter of William Cockayne of Clapham, she was born at Lambeth during the latter part of 1645, and baptised in Lambeth Church on 23 January 1646.

Jane was married at Lambeth Church on 18 June 1660 to Charles Myddelton of Ruabon (1635–1691), third surviving son of Sir Thomas Myddelton of Chirk. Myddelton and his wife lived in London and appear to have subsisted for a time upon the bounty of relatives. A legacy from Lady Needham fell in upon that lady's death in 1666, and another upon Sir Thomas Myddelton's death in the same year.

During 1667 the Myddeltons moved to the north side of Charles Street, then at the extreme west end of London. Jane Myddelton had also a country retreat at Greenwich, and she was often a guest of George Villiers, 2nd Duke of Buckingham, at Clevedon.

After the accession of James II, "Mrs. Myddelton" (Jane, it is thought) enjoyed an annual pension of £500 from secret service money. Her husband, who had for some years held a place of about £400 a year in the prize office, died insolvent in 1691. She died in the following year, and was buried beside her husband in Lambeth Church.

== Supposed lovers ==
Jane Myddelton as a married woman was much courted by men; she is now thought to have taken just two lovers, Ralph Montagu and Laurence Hyde, 1st Earl of Rochester. Antonia Fraser writes that her life "was founded on masculine support in return for sexual favours", but also that her affairs "were seen more as a tribute paid to her great beauty". She was an amateur artist capable of contributing to the iconography of her portraits. Besides that by Peter Lely in the "Windsor Beauties" series, there was second Lely portrait (1666) commissioned by Robert Spencer, 2nd Earl of Sunderland for another series.

Those who pursued Jane Myddelton included:

- Philibert de Gramont;
- Viscount Ranelagh;
- William Russell, son of the Hon. Edward Russell, and standard-bearer in the first regiment of foot-guards;
- In 1665, the king Charles II;
- In 1667, James, Duke of York;
- Edmund Waller, met at Clevedon;
- Charles de Saint-Évremond;
- The Hon. Francis Russell.

== Family ==
By her husband Jane had a daughter, Jane, baptised 21 November 1661. Called Jenny, she eventually married Charles May, nephew of Baptist May, in 1711. She died in 1740. In 1678 her mother, with Elizabeth, Lady Harvey, planned for Jenny to become the mistress of Charles II, but it came to nothing. At around this time Henry Gascar made a mezzotint portrait of Jenny.

The elder Jane's younger sister, Eleanor Needham, was mistress for several years to the Duke of Monmouth and mother by him of four children, who bore the name of Crofts. One of the daughters, Henrietta (d. 1730), married in 1697 Charles Paulet, 2nd Duke of Bolton.

== Cultural mentions ==
Saint-Évremond introduced her into a poem named "Une scene de bassette", playing cards with the Duchesse de Mazarin and the Hon. Francis Villiers, and talking affectedly, to the irritation of the duchess, who is losing. Antoine Hamilton, a friend of the rejected de Gramont, wrote that she subjected her lovers to soporific talk.

Saint-Evremond also wrote her epitaph.

== Notes ==
Attribution

This article incorporates text from a publication now in the public domain: Lee, Sidney, ed. (1894). "Myddelton, Jane". Dictionary of National Biography. Vol. 39. London: Smith, Elder & Co.
