= William Brooke (MP, died 1643) =

English soldier and politician

Sir William Brooke KB (1598 – 20 September 1643) was an English soldier and politician. He was the Member of Parliament for Rochester, Kent.

== Biography ==
He was the only son of George Brooke and Elizabeth Burgh, and in 1619 would have succeeded his uncle Henry Brooke, 11th Baron Cobham as Baron Cobham, if the barony had not been under attainder, because of his father and uncle's treason, both having participated in the Main Plot of 1603 against King James I of England.

On 1 February 1626, he was invested as a Knight of the Bath. He served as the Member of Parliament for Rochester, Kent from 1628 to 1629.

Brooke married twice; his first wife was Pembroke Lennard (daughter of Henry Lennard, 12th Baron Dacre and Chrysogona Baker, daughter of Sir Richard Baker), and his second wife was Penelope Hill, daughter of Sir Moyses Hill of Hillsborough, County Down, and his first wife Alice McDonnell and widow of Arthur Wilmot. He had surviving daughters by both wives, including Margaret and Frances. Margaret, Lady Denham (1642–1667), his fourth daughter, was a celebrated beauty who was painted by Peter Lely and was the mistress of the future King James II. Her husband, the poet Sir John Denham, is said to have murdered her in revenge for her infidelity, although in fact, her death was probably natural. Her sister, the Hon. Frances Brooke, who married Sir Thomas Whitmore, was another noted beauty.

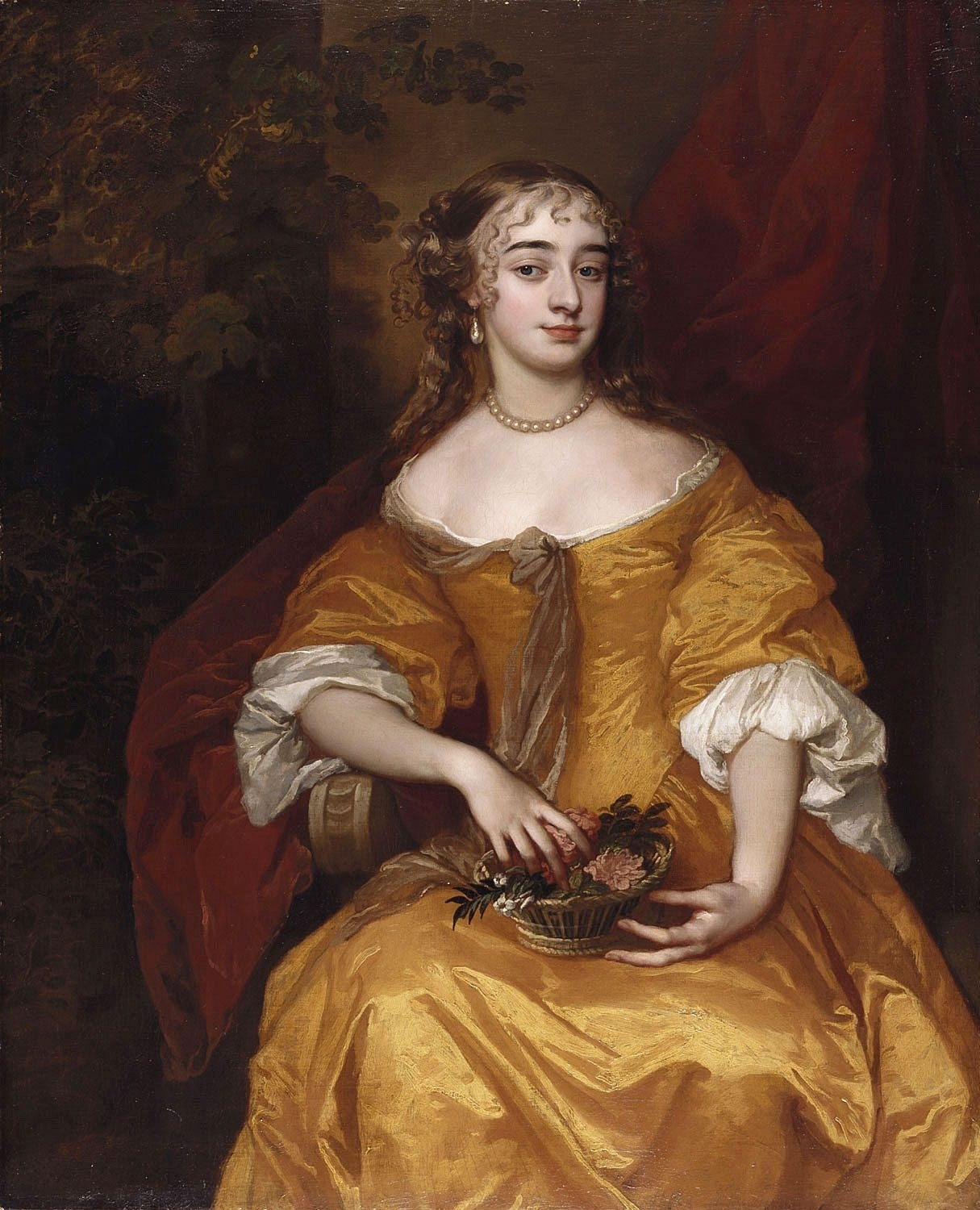
Brooke's youngest daughter, Margaret, second wife of Sir John Denham

His two principal residences were Cooling in Kent and Sterborough in Surrey. During the English Civil War he was Colonel of the Sutton-at-Hone Lathe Volunteers of the Kent Trained Bands, and died from wounds received at the First Battle of Newbury. As he had no sons, the barony (subject to attainder) fell into abeyance between his four daughters and co-heirs.

His widow remarried Hon. Edward Russell, younger son of Francis Russell, 4th Earl of Bedford and Catherine Brydges, by whom she had several children including the leading Whig statesman Edward Russell, 1st Earl of Orford. She died in 1694.
