= Elizabeth Percy, Countess of Northumberland =

British courtier

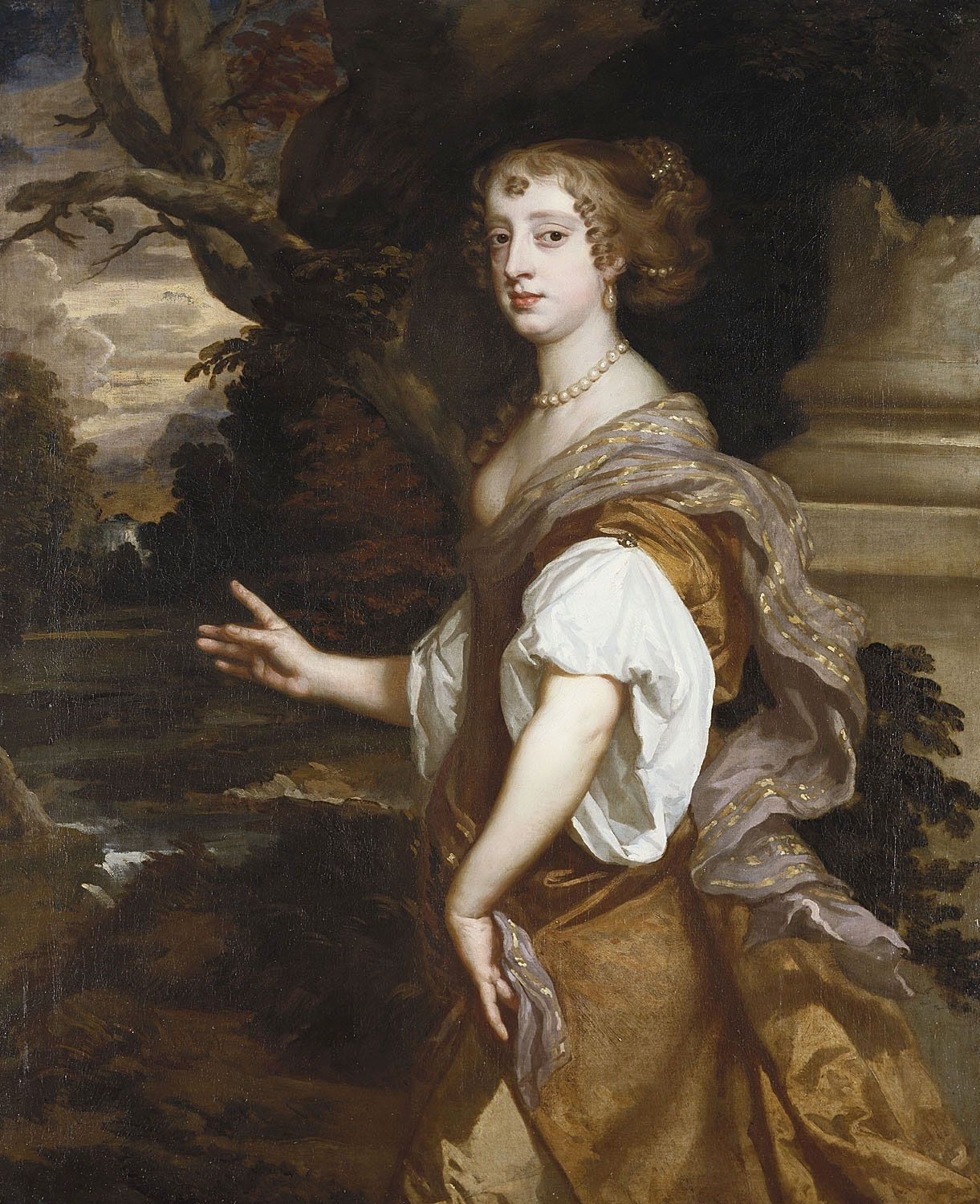
Elizabeth Wriothesley, portrait by Sir Peter Lely, for the Windsor Beauties series at Hampton Court

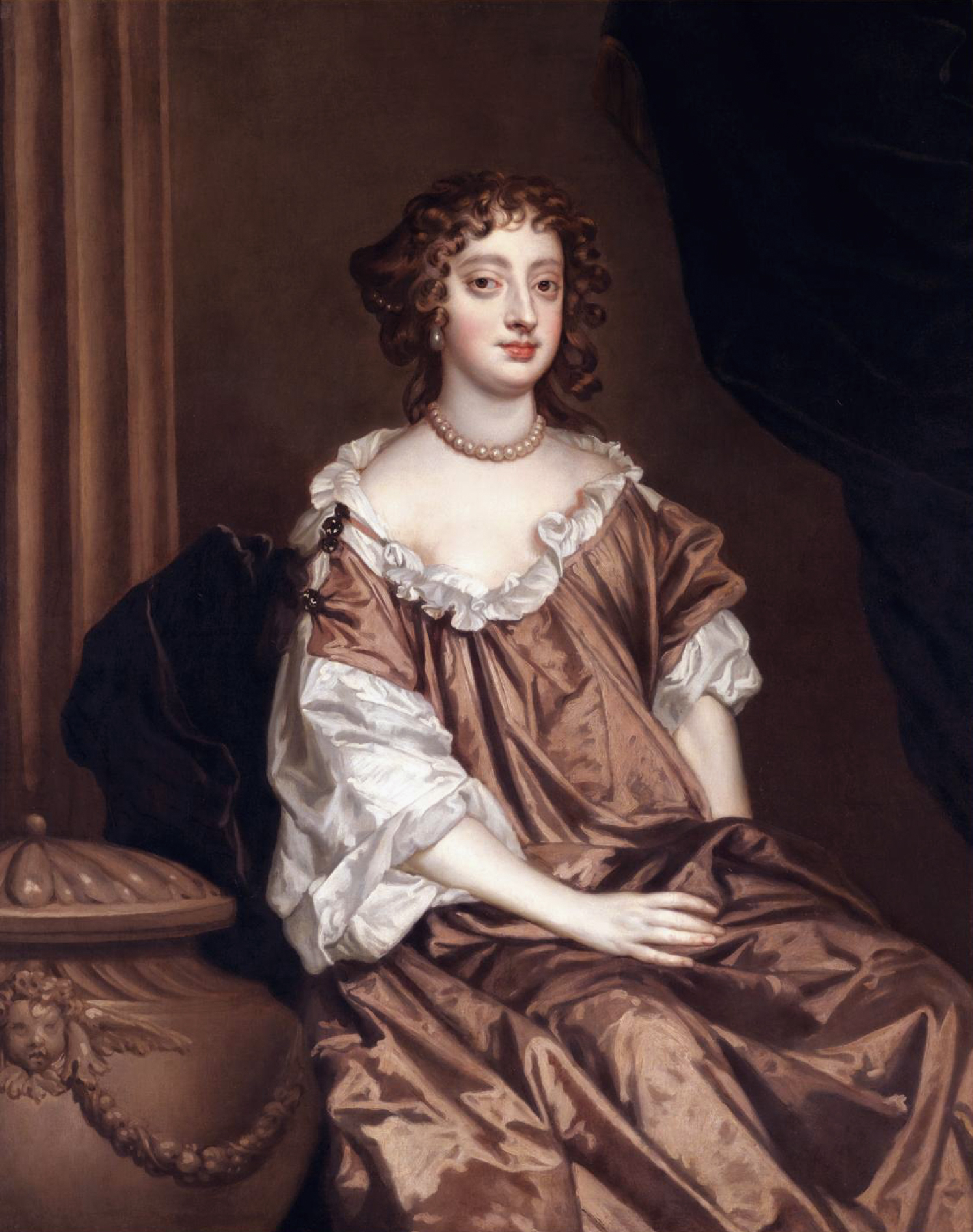
Elizabeth Wriothesley, portrait by Sir Peter Lely, private collection

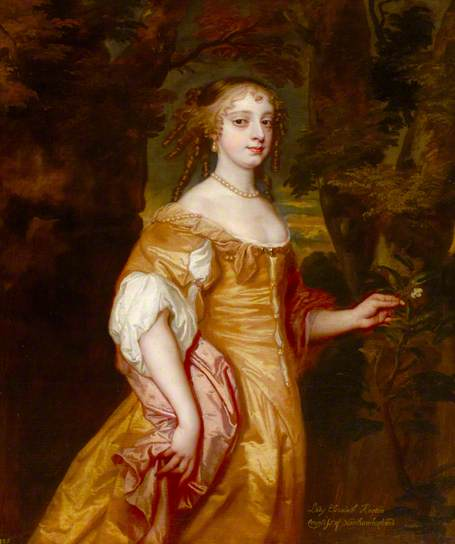
Lady Elizabeth Wriothesley, portrait c.1662/1663 by Sir Peter Lely, collection of the National Trust, Petworth House

Elizabeth Percy, Countess of Northumberland (née Wriothesley; 1646 – 19 September 1690), was a British courtier. She was one of the Windsor Beauties, painted by Sir Peter Lely.

== Origins ==
She was a daughter of Thomas Wriothesley, 4th Earl of Southampton (1607–1667) by his wife Lady Elizabeth Leigh, daughter of Francis Leigh, 1st Earl of Chichester.

== Marriages and progeny ==
She married twice:

- Firstly on 23 December 1662 she married Joceline Percy, 11th Earl of Northumberland (1644–1670), of Petworth House in Sussex, and owner of vast estates elsewhere in England. She traveled with her husband to Italy, where he was taken ill and died in Turin in 1670. By Northumberland she had two children:
  - Henry Percy, Lord Percy (1668–1669), who predeceased his father and died an infant.
  - Lady Elizabeth Percy (1667–1722), who became following her brother's death the heiress of the great Percy estates and who at the age of 15 married (as her third husband) Charles Seymour, 6th Duke of Somerset (1662–1748).
- Secondly on 24 August 1673 at Titchfield, Hampshire, she married Ralph Montagu, by whom she had two children:
  - John Montagu, 2nd Duke of Montagu (c.1690 – 5 July 1749).
  - Anne Montagu, wife of Alexander Popham.

In the course of her marriage to Montagu, he inherited his father's barony and later acquired the title "Earl Montagu", making Elizabeth once more a countess. However, it was only after her death that he was created 1st Duke of Montagu.

== Windsor Beauty ==
Elizabeth was an important patron of the artist Sir Peter Lely (1618–1680), who painted her several times. Her portraits were among the Windsor Beauties at Hampton Court and among the series of beautiful women portraits, ordered by Cosimo III de' Medici, Grand Duke of Tuscany.
