= Crofts baronets =

Extinct baronetcy in the Baronetage of England

The Crofts Baronetcy, of Stow in the County of Suffolk, is a title in the Baronetage of England. It was created on 16 March 1661 for John Crofts.

William Crofts, 1st Baron Crofts, was the cousin of the first Baronet.

== Crofts baronets, of Stow (1661) ==
- Sir John Crofts, 1st Baronet (1635–1664)
