= Duchess of Grafton =

Duchess of Grafton is the title given to the wife of the Duke of Grafton. Women who have held the title include:

- Isabella FitzRoy, Duchess of Grafton (1668–1723)
- Henrietta FitzRoy, Duchess of Grafton (1690–1726)
- Anne FitzPatrick, Countess of Upper Ossory (1737–1804), who was duchess from 1757 until her divorce in 1769.
- Elizabeth FitzRoy, Duchess of Grafton (1745–1822)
- Mary FitzRoy, Duchess of Grafton (1795–1873)
- Marie FitzRoy, Duchess of Grafton (1833–1928)
- Susanna FitzRoy, Duchess of Grafton (1878–1961)
- Lucy FitzRoy, Duchess of Grafton (1897–1943)
- Rita FitzRoy, Duchess of Grafton (1911–1970)
- Fortune FitzRoy, Duchess of Grafton (1920–2021)
