= Royal Hillsborough =

Coordinates: 54.462°N 6.083°W

Royal Hillsborough: Irish: Cromghlinn
- Village
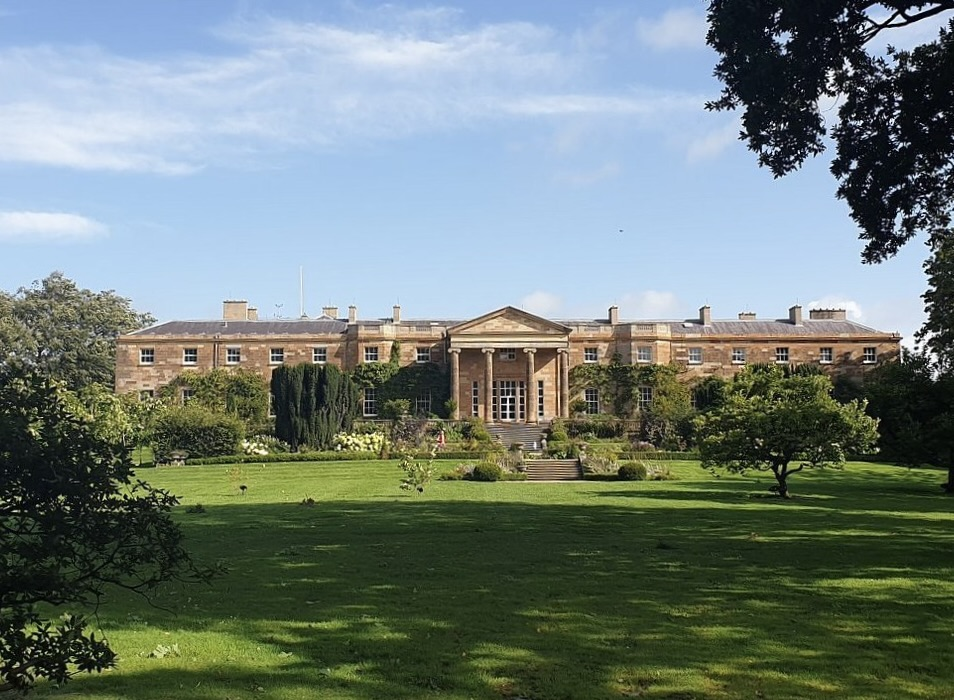
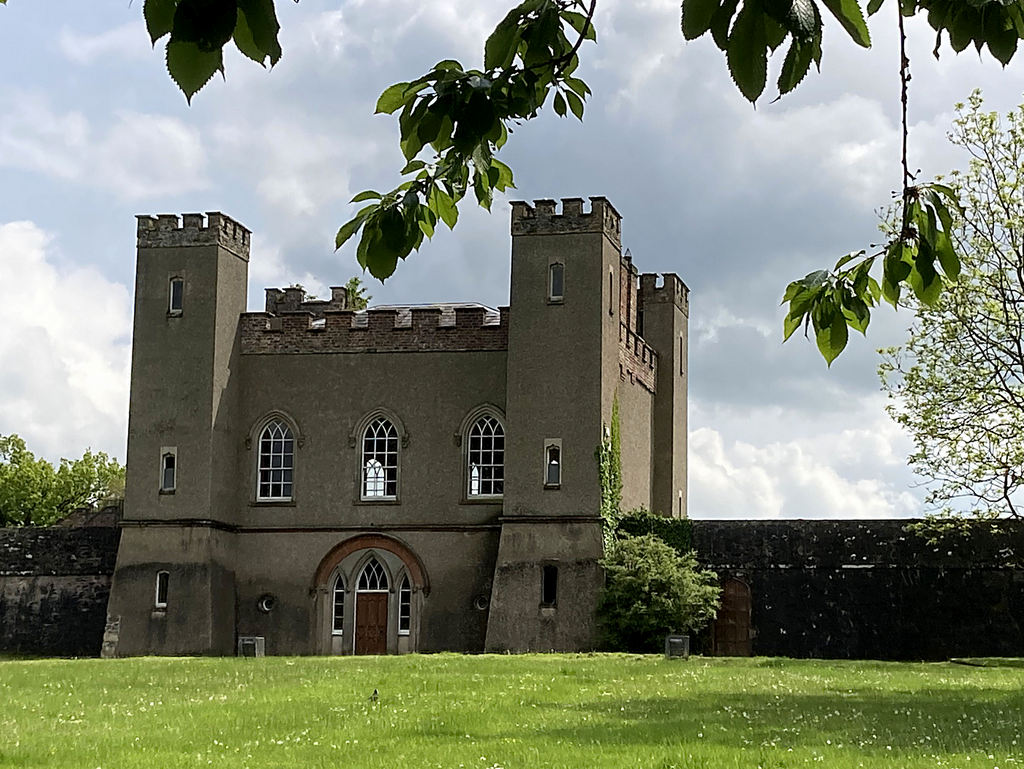
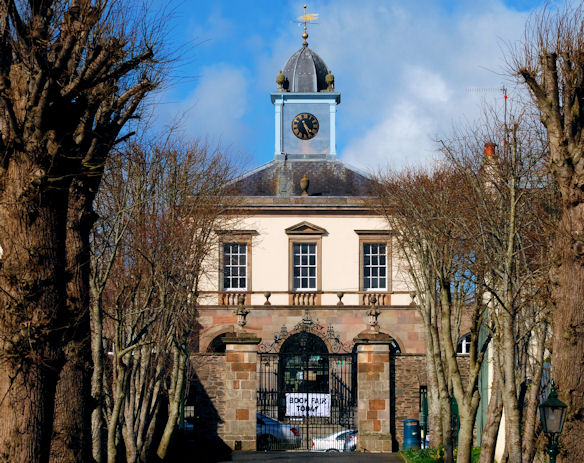
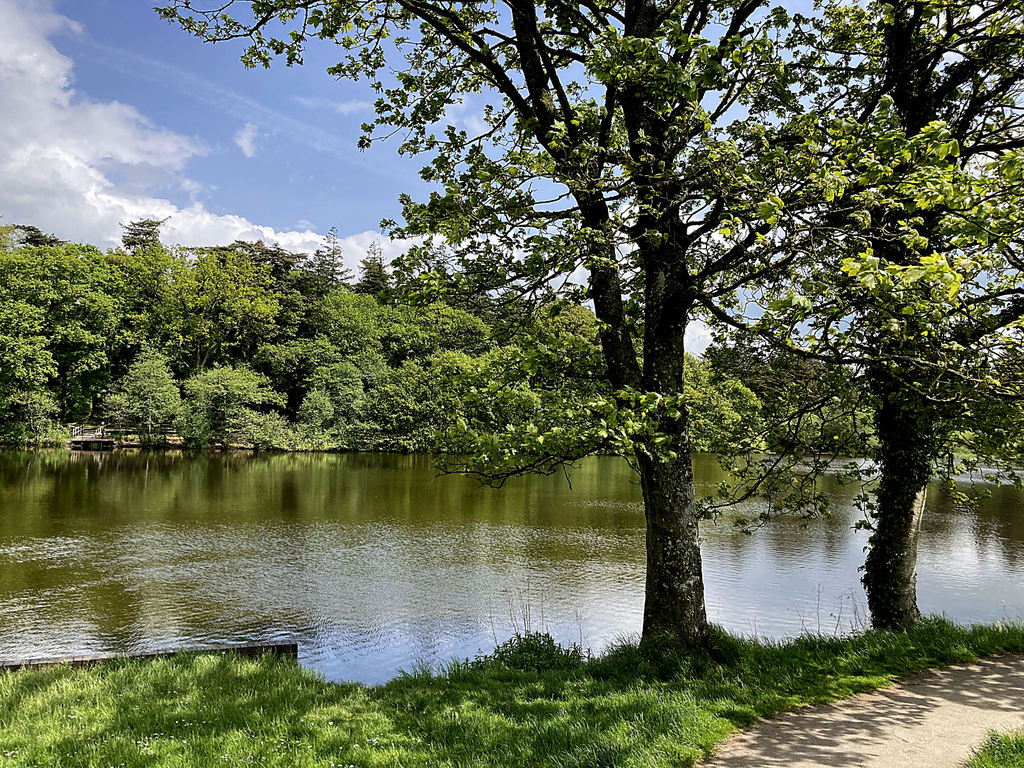
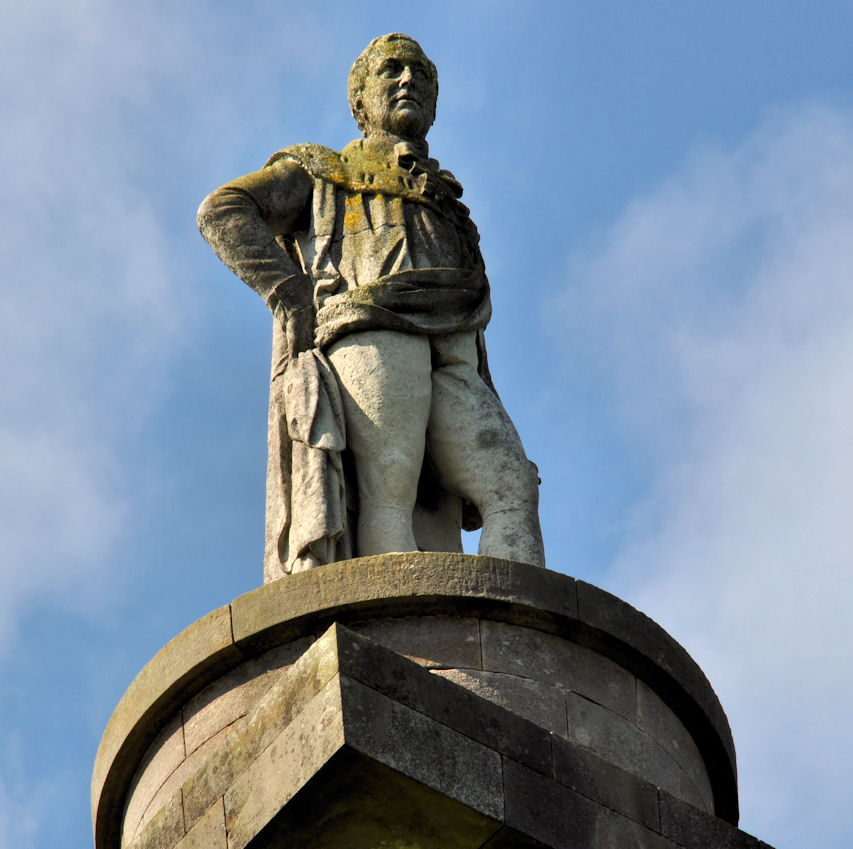
- Top: Hillsborough Castle, Middle: Hillsborough Fort, Hillsborough Market House, Bottom: Hillsborough Forest Park, Downshire Monument

- Location within County Down
- Population: 4,160 (2021 census)
- District: Lisburn and Castlereagh
- County: County Down
- Country: Northern Ireland
- Sovereign state: United Kingdom
- Post town: HILLSBOROUGH
- Postcode district: BT26
- Dialling code: 028
- UK Parliament: Lagan Valley
- NI Assembly: Lagan Valley

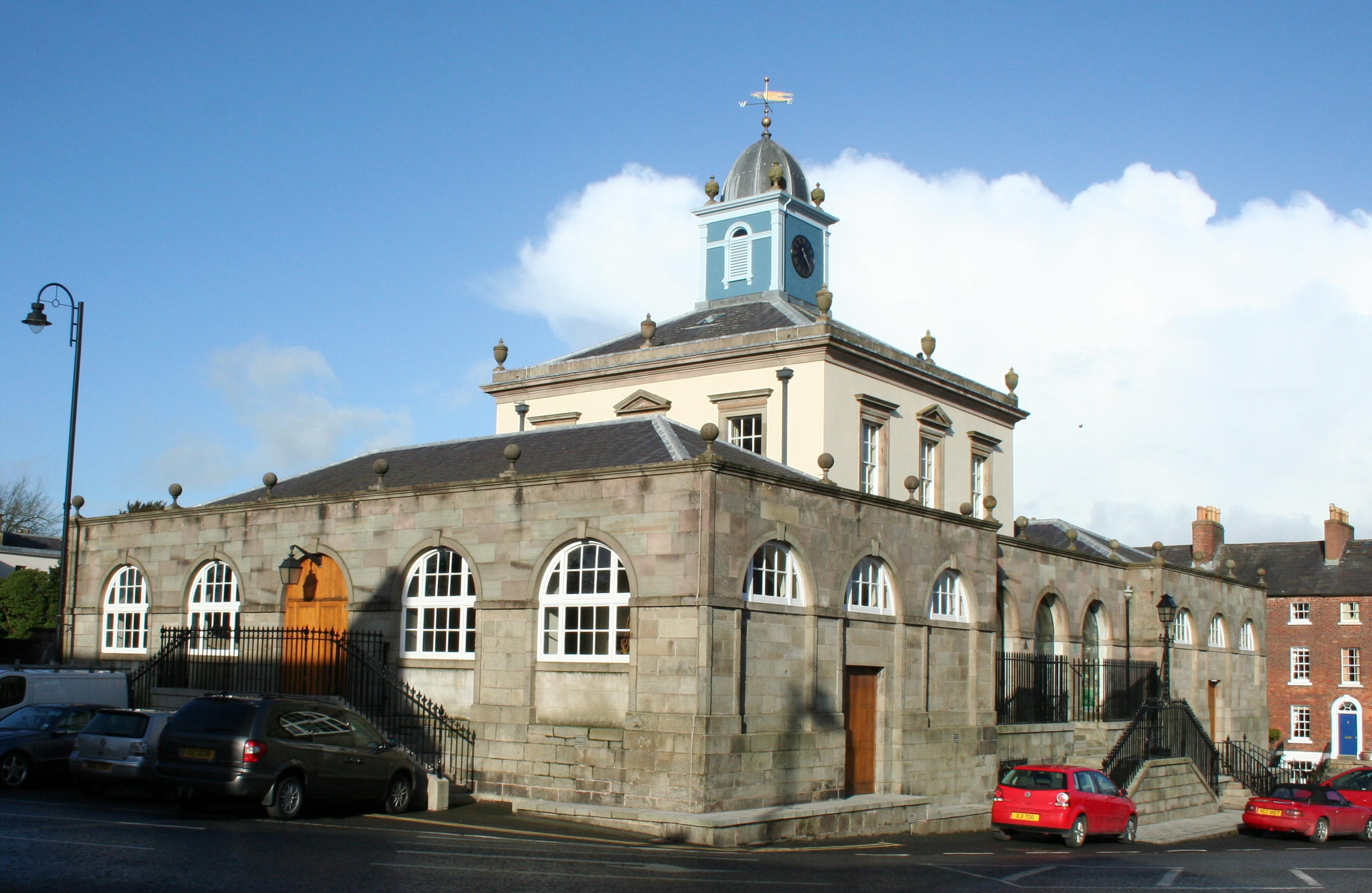
Former Market House – the Court House and Tourist Information Office

Royal Hillsborough more commonly known simply as Hillsborough, is a historic village and civil parish in County Down, Northern Ireland, 19 km (12 mi) from the city of Belfast. It is within the Lisburn and Castlereagh District Council area, and had a population of 4,160 in the 2021 census.

The village is noted for its Georgian architecture. It is home to Hillsborough Castle, the British royal family's official residence in Northern Ireland, and residence of the British Secretary of State for Northern Ireland.

== History ==
Before 1661, the townland was known as Crumlin or Cromlin (from Irish Cromghlinn 'crooked glen'). By 1661, during the Plantation of Ulster, the townland and the settlement within it had been renamed Hillsborough. It was named after English army officer Sir Moses Hill, and his son Arthur Hill, who built Hillsborough Fort in 1650 to command the road from Dublin to Carrickfergus. The Hill family became the Earls of Hillsborough, then Marquesses of Downshire.

The mansion known as Hillsborough Castle was built in 1770 for The 1st Earl of Hillsborough (he was later created The 1st Marquess of Downshire, in 1789).

A prominent memorial to The 3rd Marquess of Downshire (1788–1845)—closely resembling Nelson's Column in Trafalgar Square, London—stands to the south of the village and is visible throughout much of the surrounding area.

In 2007, Hillsborough won 3rd place in the annual Ulster in Bloom competition in the large village category.

In 2021, it was announced that letters patent would be issued granting the village the prefix "Royal", thus officially becoming "Royal Hillsborough", in recognition of Hillsborough Castle, the official royal residence for Northern Ireland. The Letters Patent came into effect on 20 October that year.

== Governance ==
Hillsborough was within Lisburn City Council until 1 April 2015, when it formed part of the new Lisburn and Castlereagh District Council. Royal Hillsborough is located within the Westminster constituency of Lagan Valley and Northern Ireland Assembly constituency of Lagan Valley.

== Demography ==
=== 2021 Census ===
On Census day (21 March 2021) there were 4,160 people living in Hillsborough and Culcavy.

=== 2011 Census ===
On Census day (27 March 2011) there were 3,952 people living in Hillsborough and Culcavy. Of these:

- 17.1% were aged under 16 years and 20.6% were aged 65 and over
- 48.4% of the population were male and 51.6% were female
- 81.6% were from a Protestant or other Christian background, and 9.8% were from a Catholic background
- 3.1% of people aged 16–74 were unemployed

== Places of interest ==
- Hillsborough Castle is a two-storey Georgian mansion, and served as Government House from 1924 until 1973. It remains the official residence of King Charles III (and other Royal Family members) when visiting Northern Ireland. It has also been the official residence of the Secretary of State for Northern Ireland since 1973. Hillsborough Castle was the venue for the signing of the Anglo-Irish Agreement in 1985. Former Prime Minister Tony Blair stayed at the castle on many occasions during negotiations related to the peace process, and he hosted President George W. Bush at the castle for a one night visit in 2003.
- Hillsborough Fort
- Hillsborough Forest Park and Lake forms the picturesque setting for the original fort residence of Lord Hillsborough.
- Hillsborough hosts an International Oyster Festival each year, usually in September. This attracts thousands of visitors. The festivities include boat racing, parachuting, garden fêtes, oyster eating and Guinness drinking.

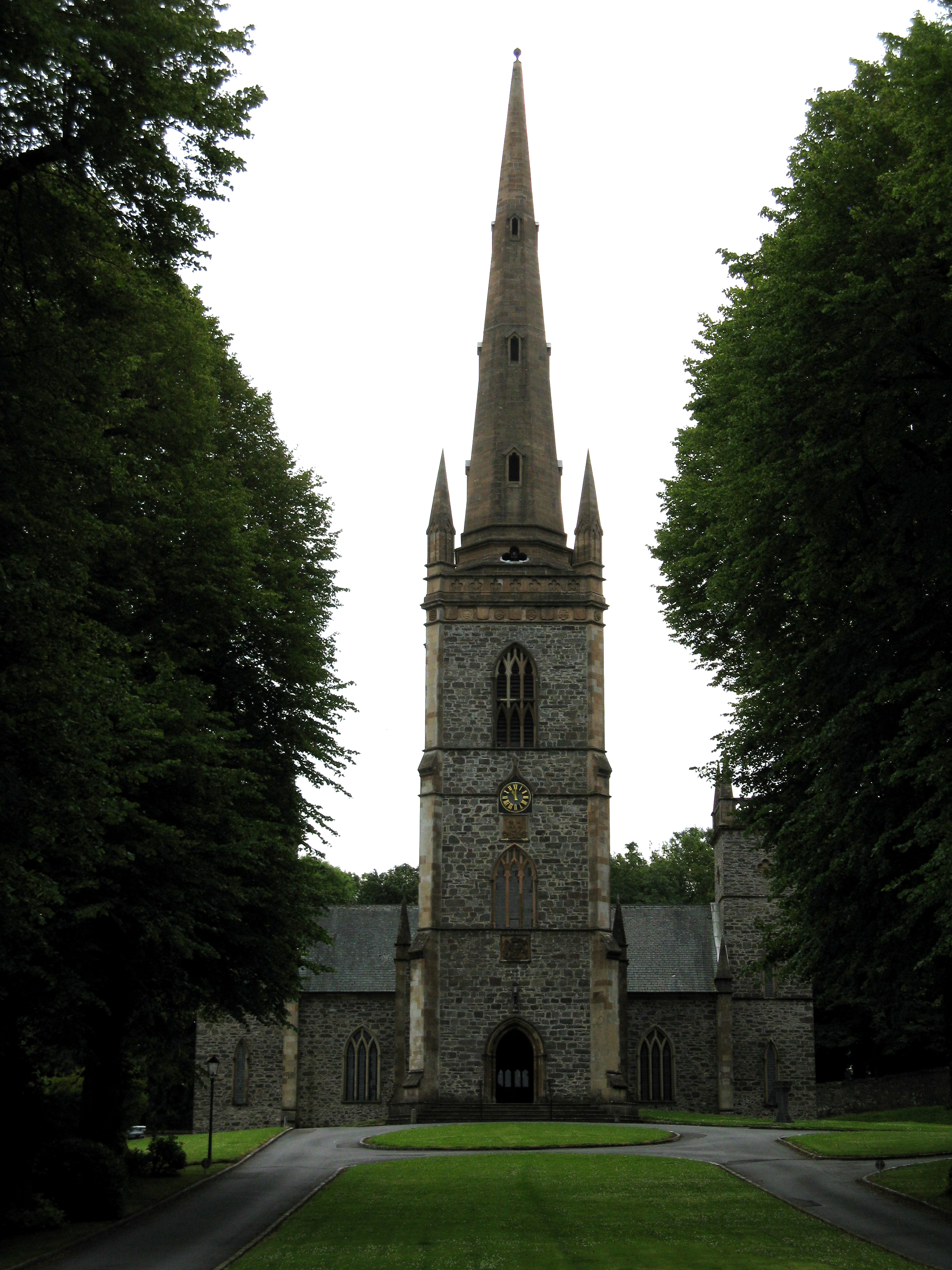
Hillsborough, St. Malachy's

- The historic parish church dedicated to Saint Malachy is one of the finest examples of Gothic Revival architecture. It was built for The 1st Earl of Hillsborough between 1760 and 1774, in the hope that the church would become the cathedral of the Church of Ireland Diocese of Down and Connor. In addition to its imposing setting, it boasts two 18th-century organs, a peal of ten bells and a number of works by notable craftsmen of the era, including the Colours of the County Down Battalion of Carson's Ulster Volunteers. Today it is a parish in the Church of Ireland Diocese of Down and Dromore.

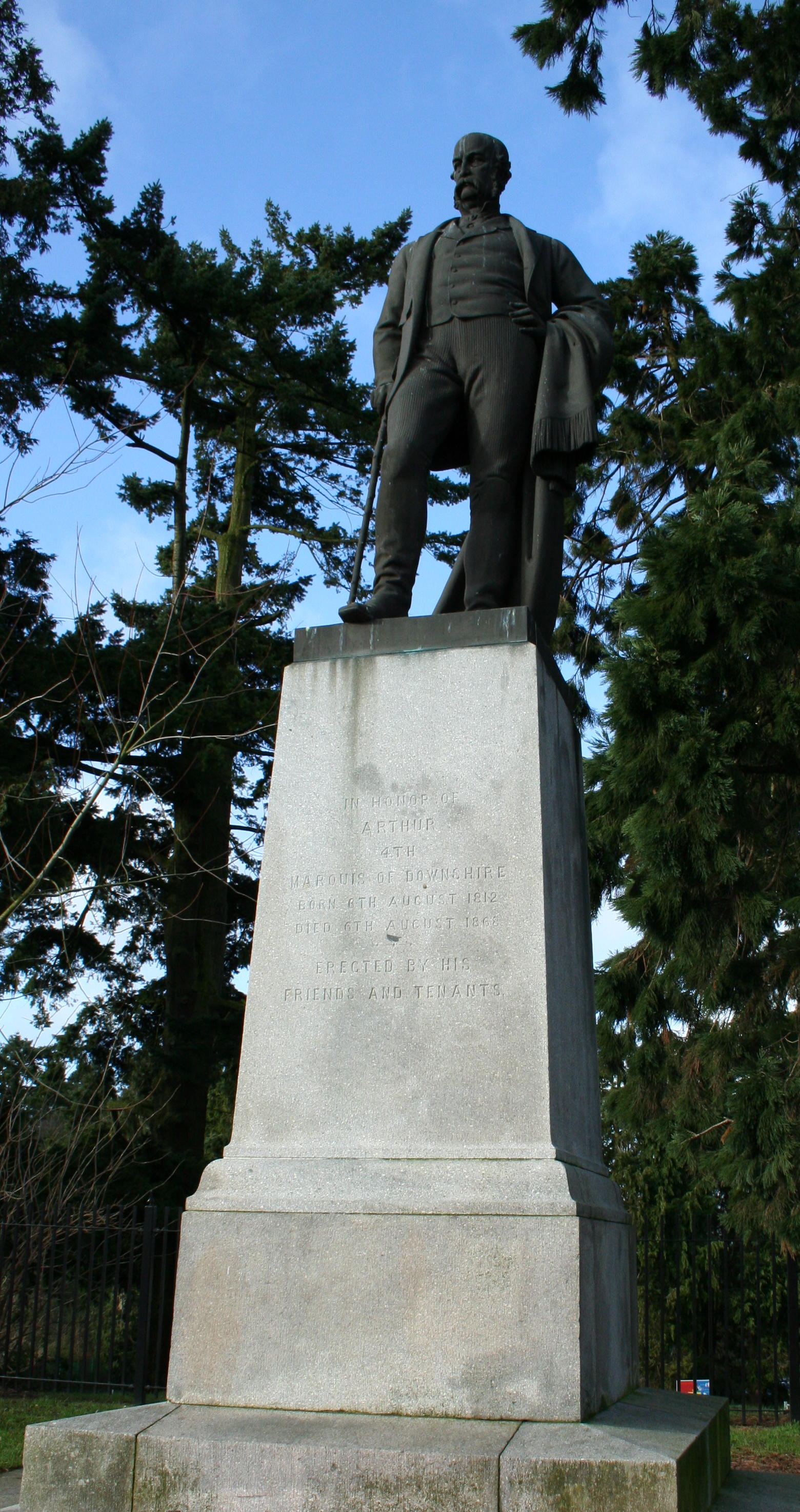
Monument to The 4th Marquess of Downshire.

== Notable people ==
- Sir Hamilton Harty (1879–1941), composer and conductor
- Gloria Hunniford, television and radio presenter
- Richard Lyons (born 1979), racing driver and Formula Nippon champion
- Jimmy McLarnin (1907–2004), professional boxer
- Frank Pantridge (1916–2004) was a physician and cardiologist born in Hillsborough, who invented the portable defibrillator.

== Railways ==
Hillsborough railway station was opened by the Banbridge, Lisburn and Belfast Railway on 13 July 1863. The line through the station was part of the Great Northern Railway (Ireland). The station closed on 30 April 1956 under the auspices of the Great Northern Railway Board. Train services were replaced by bus services provided by the Ulster Transport Authority (UTA). No trace of the station now remains, as it was removed when the dual carriageway was built. It was situated where this crosses over the Culcavey Road.

== Sport ==
- In 2005 Lisnagarvey Hockey Club relocated from their Blaris ground to the outskirts of Hillsborough.
- Downshire Young Men F.C.

== Climate ==
Climate data for Hillsborough climate station (91m elevation) 1991–2020 averages
Month	Jan	Feb	Mar	Apr	May	Jun	Jul	Aug	Sep	Oct	Nov	Dec	Year
Record high °C (°F)	14.7 (58.5)	15.8 (60.4)	19.4 (66.9)	22.8 (73.0)	23.8 (74.8)	28.1 (82.6)	29.5 (85.1)	28.4 (83.1)	24.5 (76.1)	21.1 (70.0)	15.8 (60.4)	14.5 (58.1)	29.5 (85.1)
Mean daily maximum °C (°F)	7.3 (45.1)	7.8 (46.0)	9.4 (48.9)	11.7 (53.1)	14.7 (58.5)	17.1 (62.8)	18.6 (65.5)	18.3 (64.9)	16.2 (61.2)	12.8 (55.0)	9.7 (49.5)	7.7 (45.9)	12.6 (54.7)
Mean daily minimum °C (°F)	2.0 (35.6)	1.8 (35.2)	2.7 (36.9)	4.2 (39.6)	6.5 (43.7)	9.3 (48.7)	11.0 (51.8)	10.9 (51.6)	9.2 (48.6)	6.8 (44.2)	4.1 (39.4)	2.2 (36.0)	5.9 (42.6)
Record low °C (°F)	−12.2 (10.0)	−7.8 (18.0)	−10.0 (14.0)	−4.9 (23.2)	−3.3 (26.1)	0.0 (32.0)	2.5 (36.5)	1.8 (35.2)	−1.2 (29.8)	−4.5 (23.9)	−8.3 (17.1)	−11.5 (11.3)	−12.2 (10.0)
Average rainfall mm (inches)	83.9 (3.30)	65.3 (2.57)	66.5 (2.62)	57.6 (2.27)	60.0 (2.36)	69.7 (2.74)	81.1 (3.19)	83.2 (3.28)	72.4 (2.85)	91.9 (3.62)	98.6 (3.88)	87.4 (3.44)	917.5 (36.12)
Average rainy days (≥ 1.0 mm)	14.4	12.9	12.8	11.5	11.6	11.8	13.0	13.2	12.0	13.8	15.1	14.8	157.0
Mean monthly sunshine hours	44.8	72.0	106.7	153.5	194.4	159.7	150.1	152.0	119.2	94.3	60.1	38.3	1,345.2
Source 1: metoffice.gov.uk
Source 2: KNMI

== See also ==
- Hillsborough, County Down (civil parish)
- List of towns and villages in Northern Ireland
- List of localities in Northern Ireland by population
- List of civil parishes of County Down
