= Windsor Beauties =

Portrait paintings of ladies of the court of King Charles II

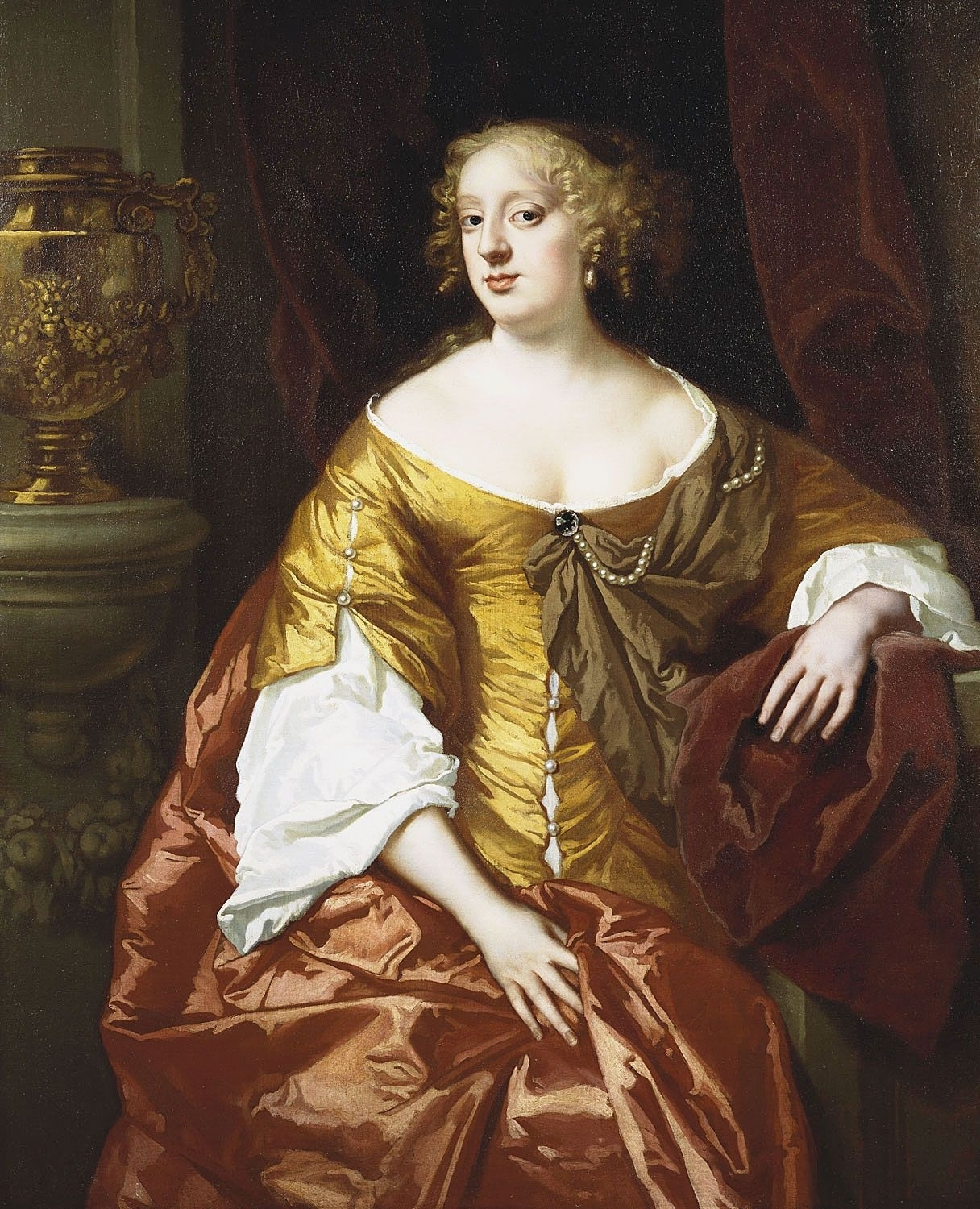
Anne Spencer, Countess of Sunderland, before 1666

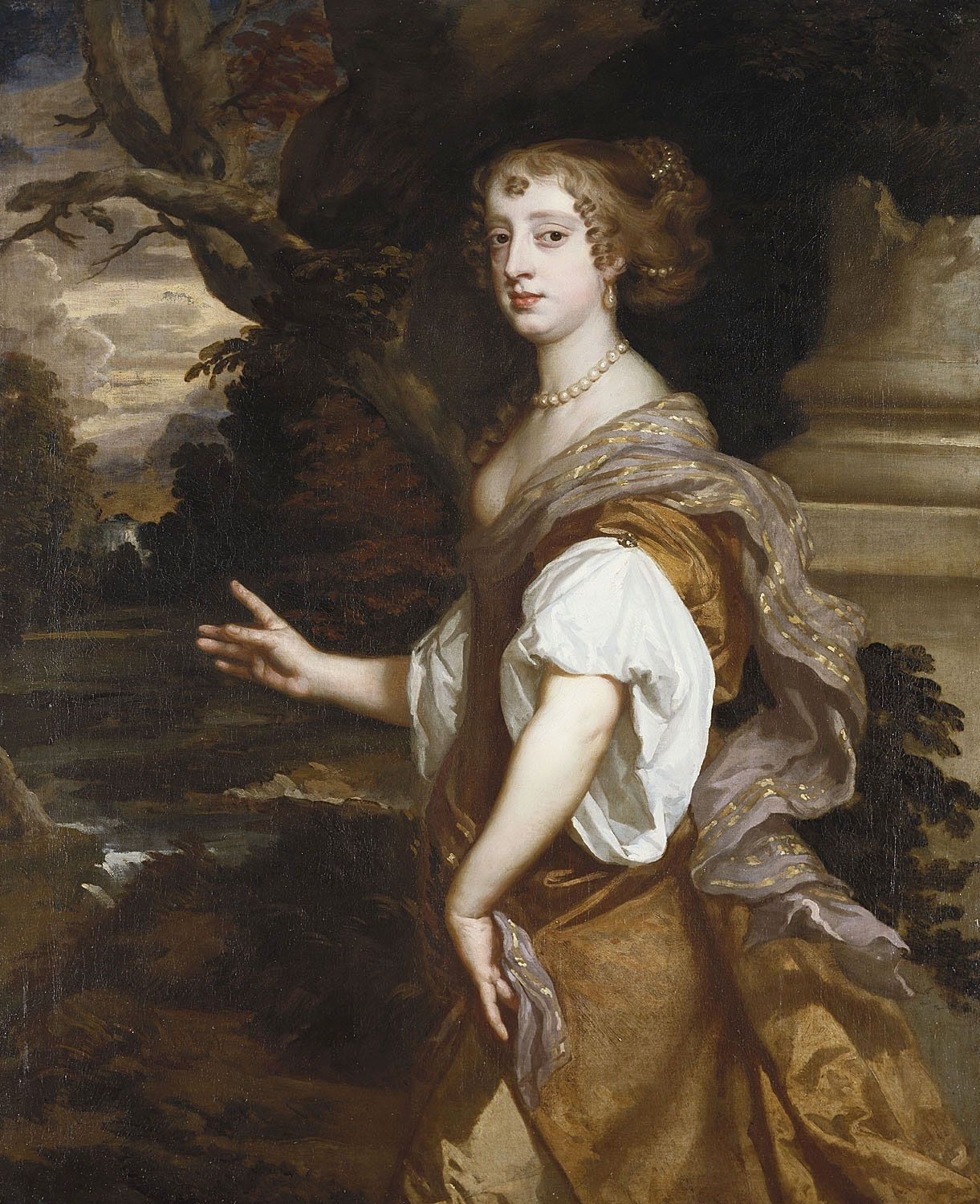
Elizabeth Percy, Countess of Northumberland, 1669

The Windsor Beauties are a set of portrait paintings, still in the Royal Collection, by Sir Peter Lely and his workshop, produced in the early to mid-1660s, that depict ladies of the court of King Charles II, some of whom were his mistresses. The name stems from the original location of the collection, which was at Windsor Castle. In 2024, they were on display at Hampton Court Palace.

A set of copies was commissioned by Robert Spencer, 2nd Earl of Sunderland for his collection at Althorp, and the complete set can still be viewed there in the Picture Gallery, a room he created to show off his adoration for art.

== The portraits ==
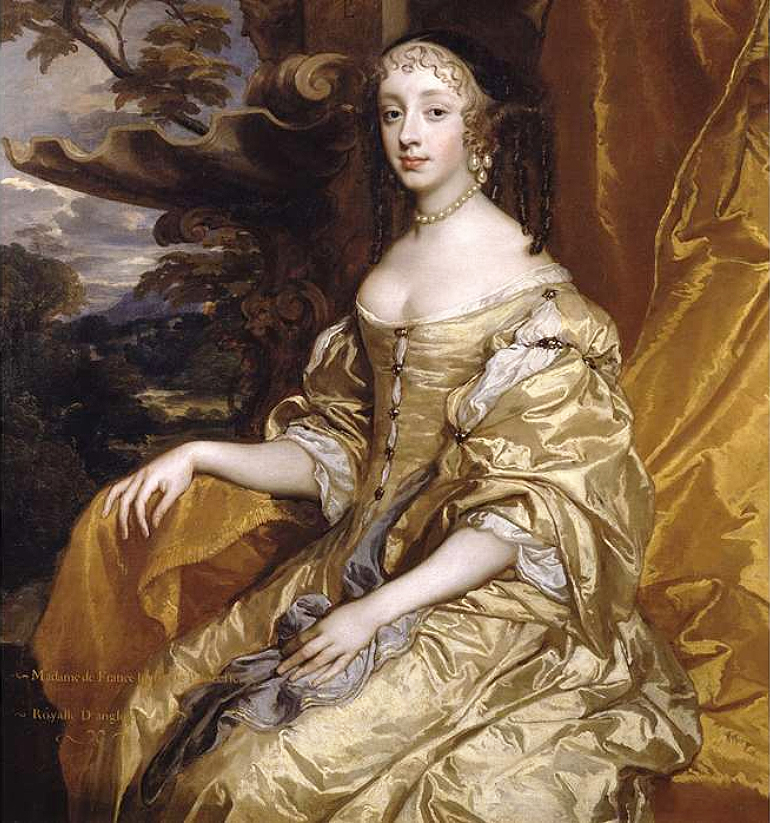
Henrietta of England, 1662

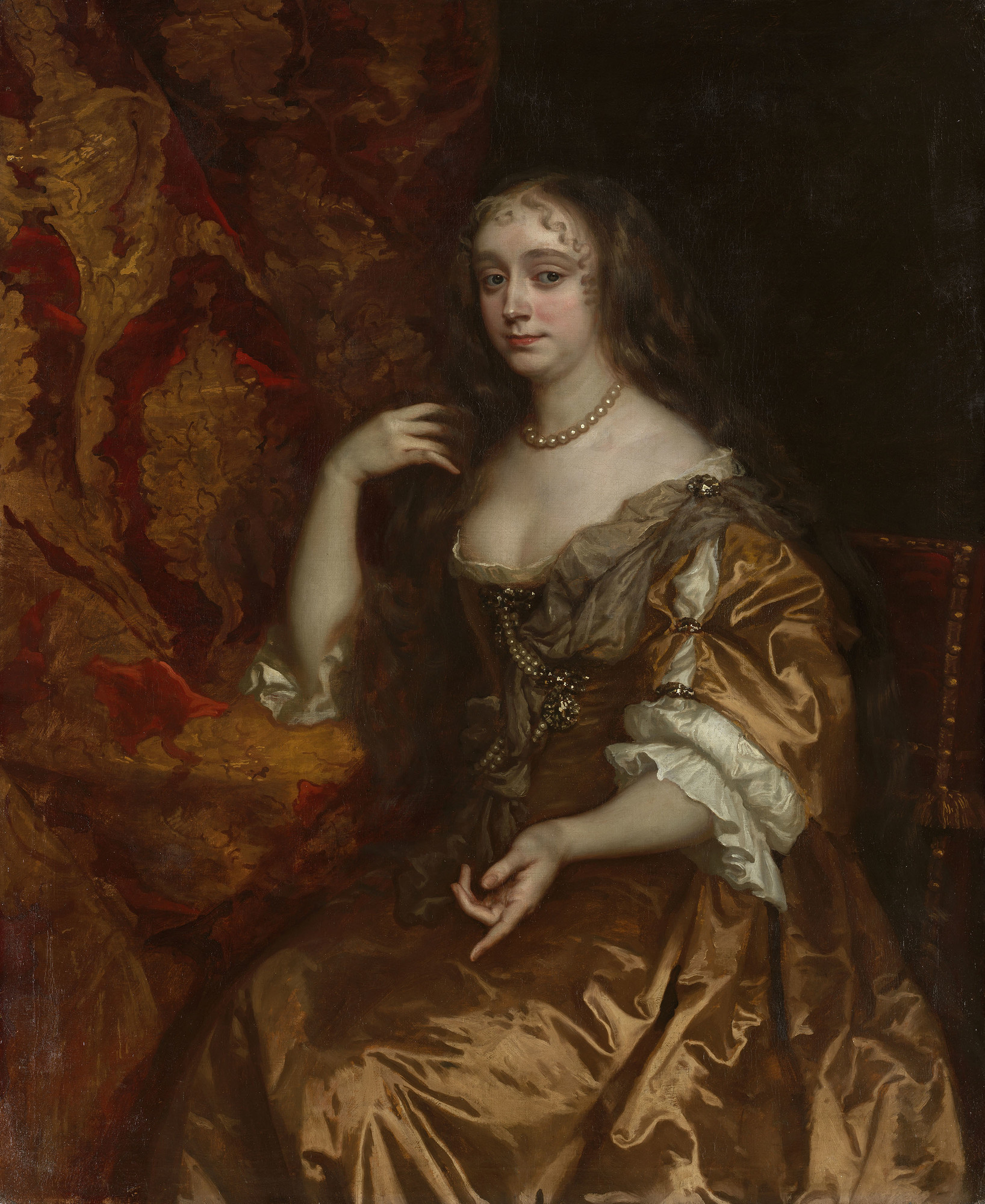
Anne, Duchess of York and Albany, 1662

The Royal Collection includes 10 portraits as part of the set. They show the women at three-quarter length in various poses. Some women wear current fashions; others are draped in loose robes intended to evoke classical antiquity.

Originally commissioned by Anne, Duchess of York and Albany, the first mention of the paintings is by Samuel Pepys, describing them in his diary as being hung in "the Duke of York's room" in 1668. A 1674 inventory lists them as in the ducal rooms at St. James's Palace; and by 1688 they had moved to the "Princess's dressing room" at Windsor Castle. Moved to the castle's state rooms during the 18th century, the Windsor Beauties were transferred to Hampton Court at some time prior to 1835.

== List of "Beauties" ==
The original set of "Beauties" painted by Lely include, depending on the source, these 12 portraits:

- Frances Stewart, Duchess of Richmond (née Frances Stewart)
- Elizabeth, Comtesse de Gramont (née Elizabeth Hamilton)
- Jane Myddelton (née Jane Needham)
- Margaret, Lady Denham (née Margaret Brooke; named Elizabeth in the cited printed sources [and in 18th century prints] but Margaret at the Royal Collection)
- Frances, Lady Whitmore (née Frances Brooke)
- Mary Sackville, Countess of Falmouth and Dorset (née Mary Bagot; named Elizabeth in the cited printed sources [and in 18th century prints] but Mary at the Royal Collection)
- Henrietta Hyde, Countess of Rochester (née Lady Henrietta Boyle)
- Barbara Palmer, 1st Duchess of Cleveland (née Hon. Barbara Villiers)
- Anne Spencer, Countess of Sunderland (née Lady Anne Digby)
- Elizabeth Percy, Countess of Northumberland (née Lady Elizabeth Wriothesley)
- Emilia Butler, Countess of Ossory (Æmilia van Nassau-Beverweerd) (Melville omits this name, citing Ernest Law that the portrait previously identified by this name is actually Lady Falmouth)
- Henrietta of England, Duchess of Orléans

The portraits for the first 10 names are included on the Royal Collection website as "probably commissioned by Anne, Duchess of York and Albany".

The Duchess does not figure in the list of beauties often; but since she was largely responsible for choosing the sitters, she was also painted as part of the series. Possibly a little flattery from Lely was responsible for this.

== Gallery ==
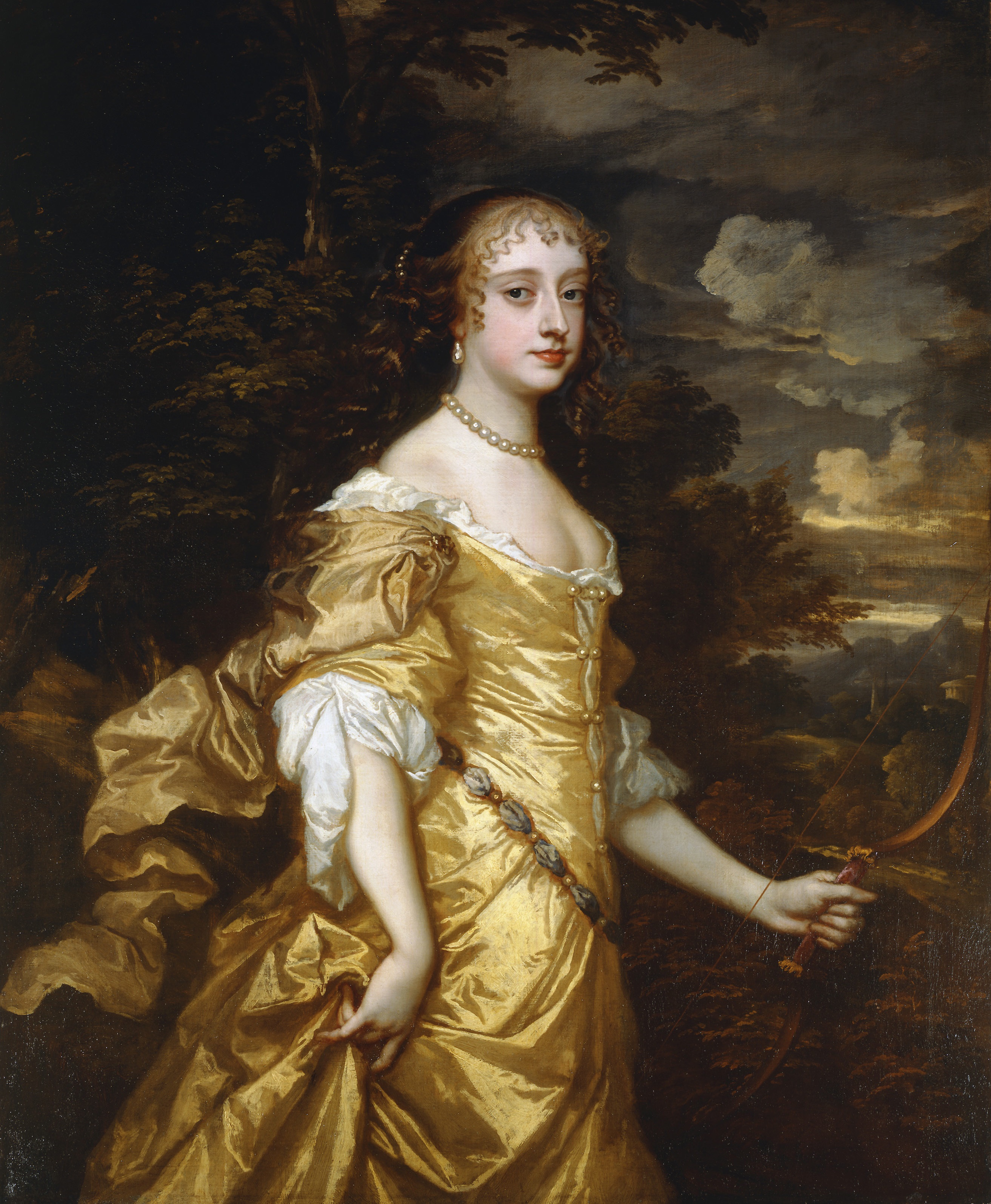
Frances Stewart, Duchess of Richmond (c. 1662)

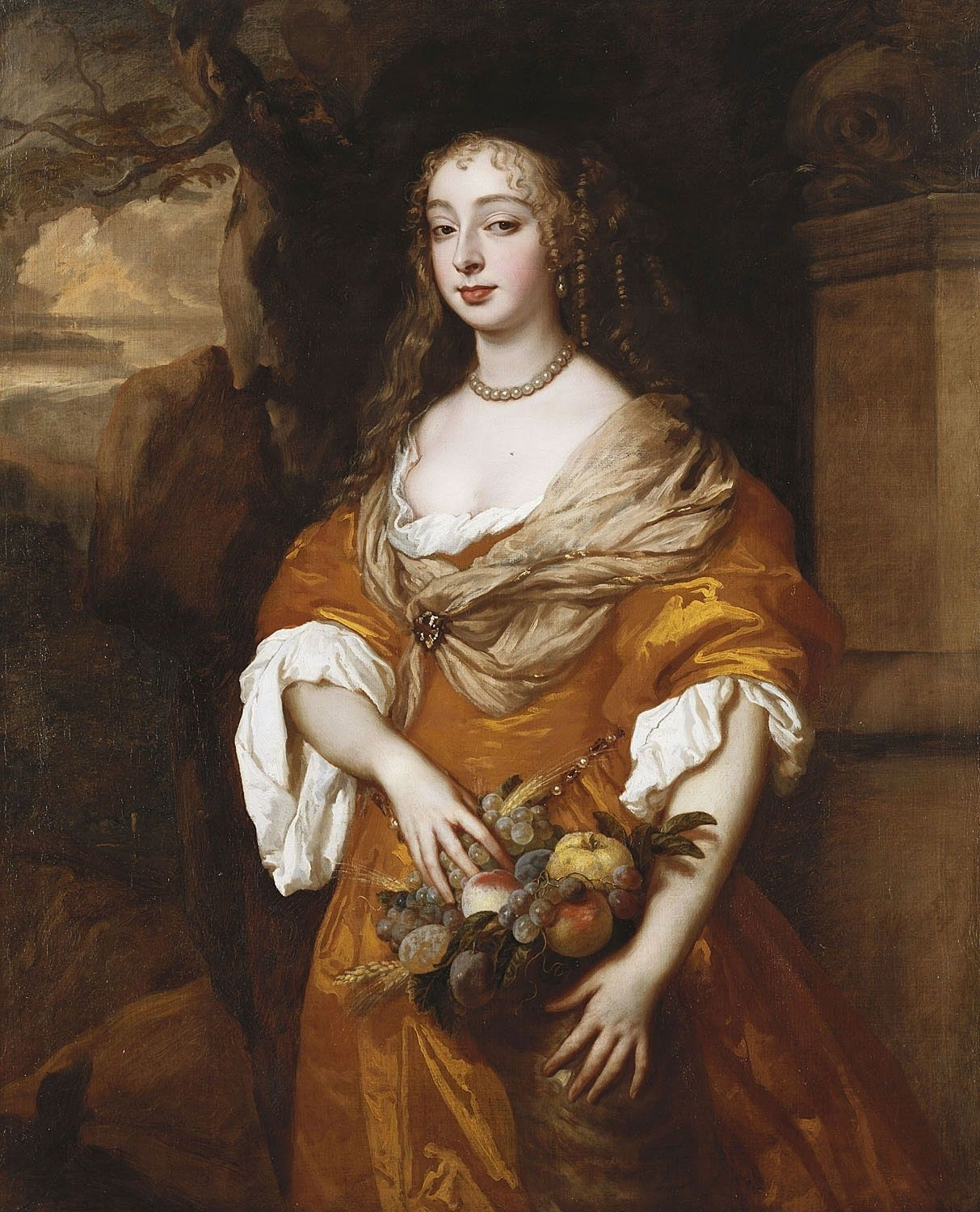
Jane, Mrs Myddleton (c. 1663–65)

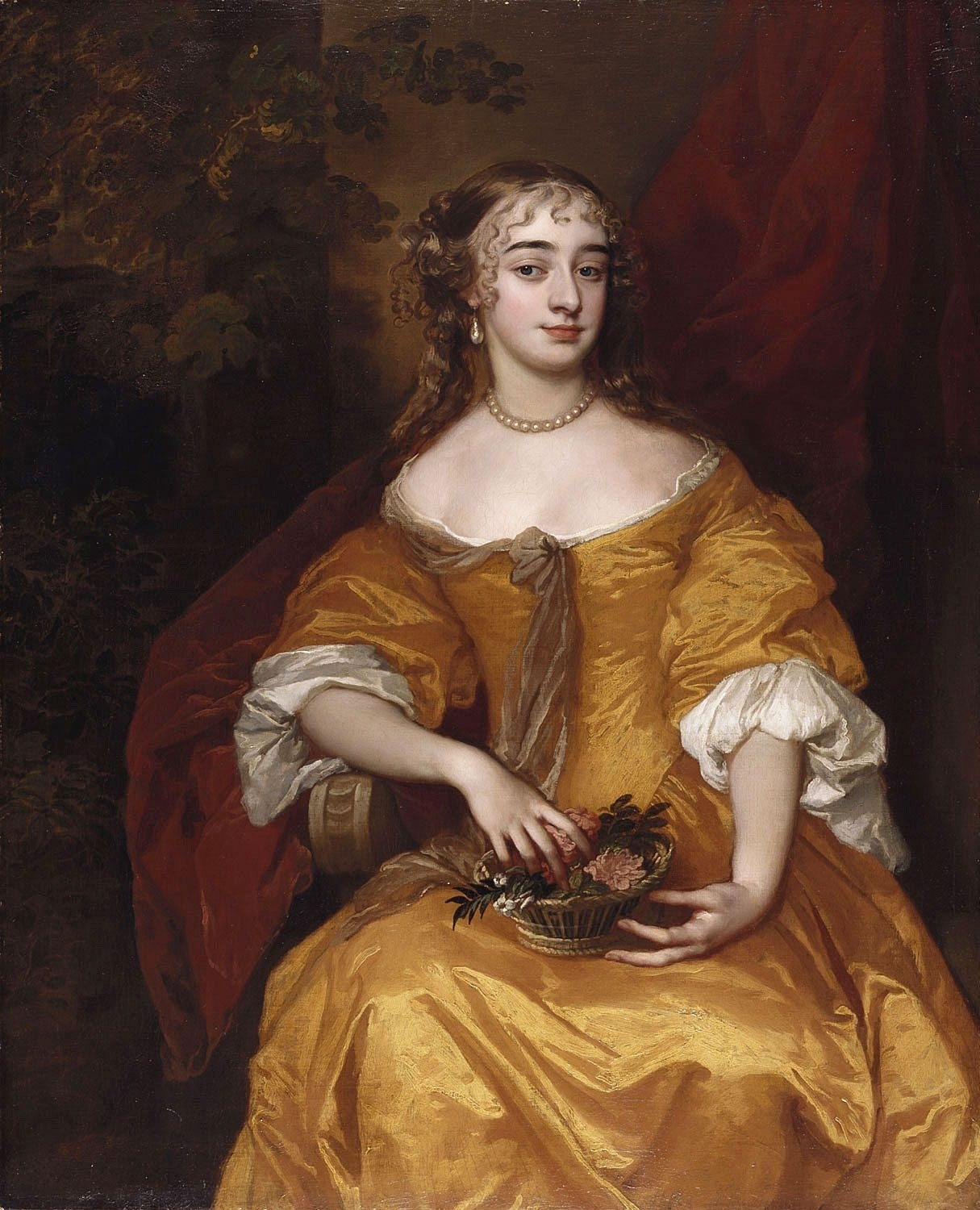
Margaret, Lady Denham (c. 1663–65)

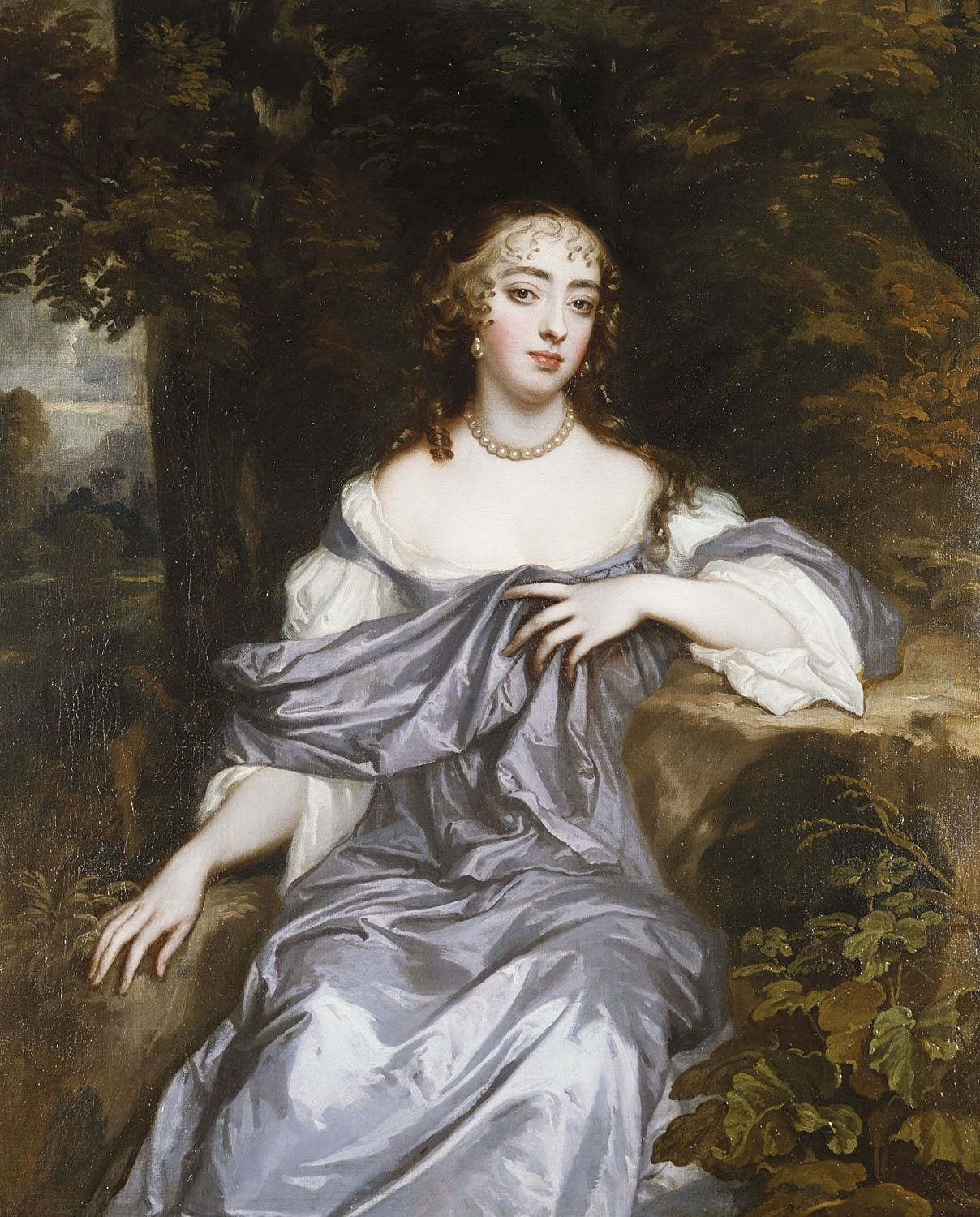
Frances, Lady Whitmore (c. 1665)

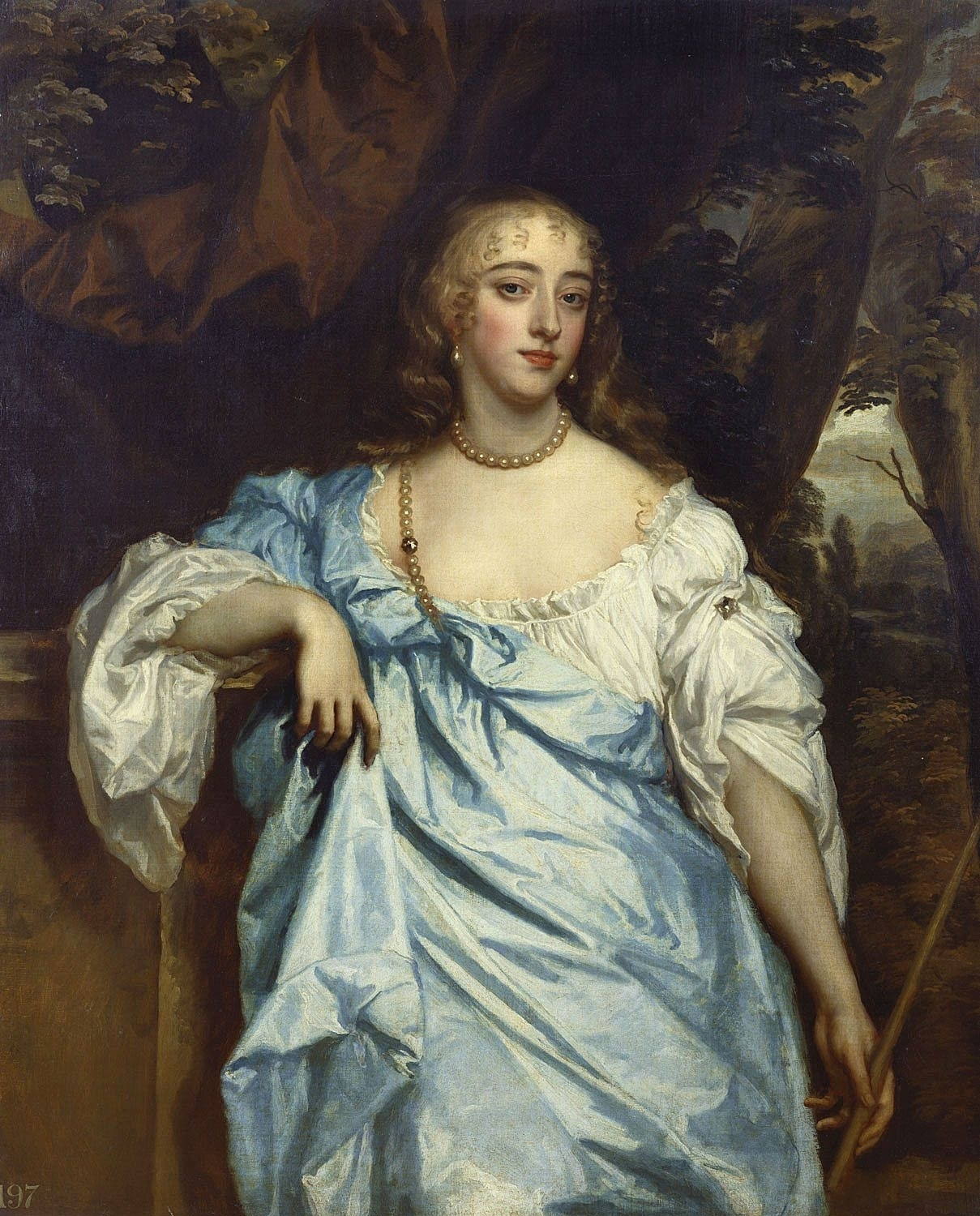
Mary Sackville, Countess of Falmouth and Dorset (c. 1664–65)

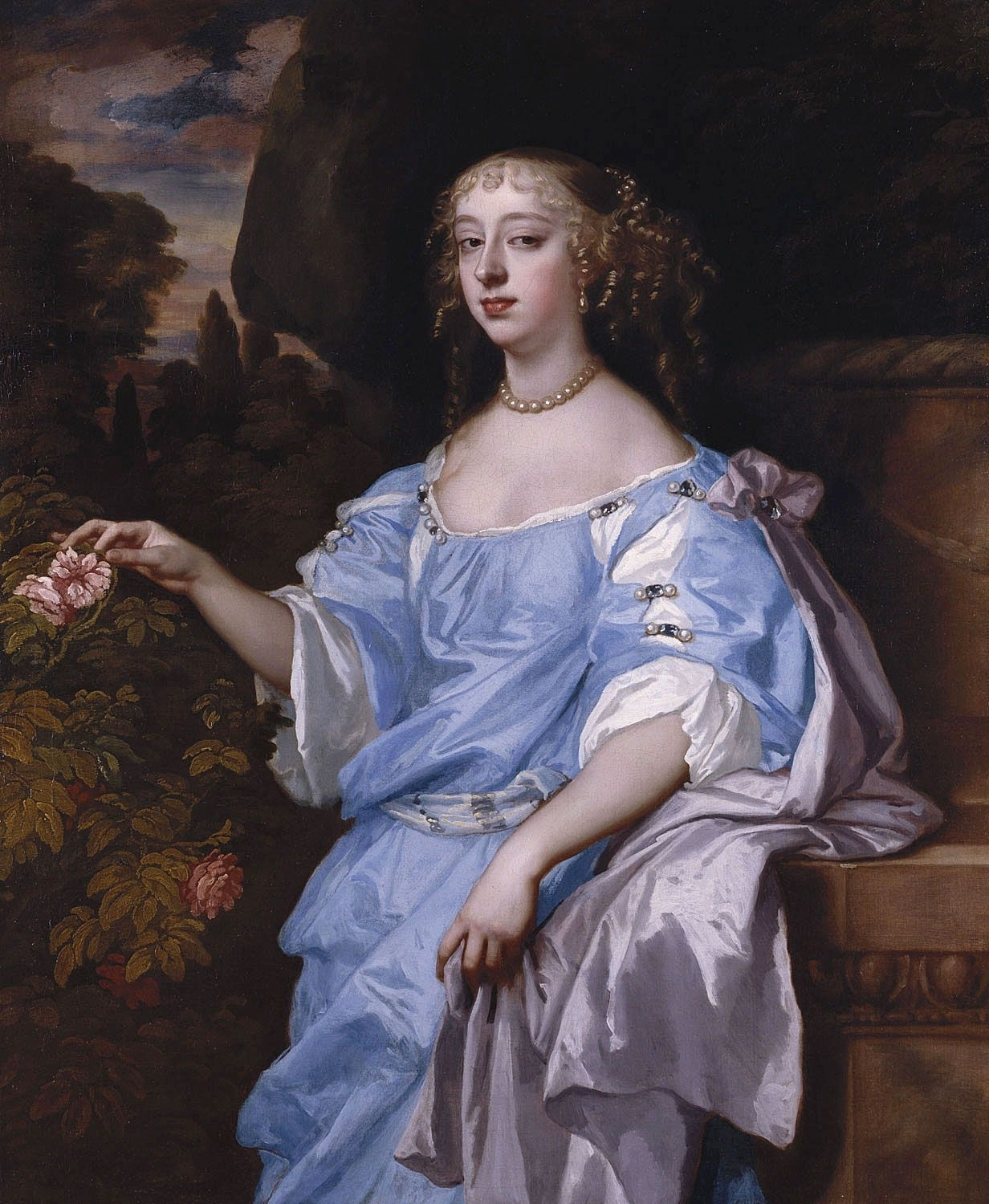
Henrietta Hyde, Countess of Rochester (c. 1665)

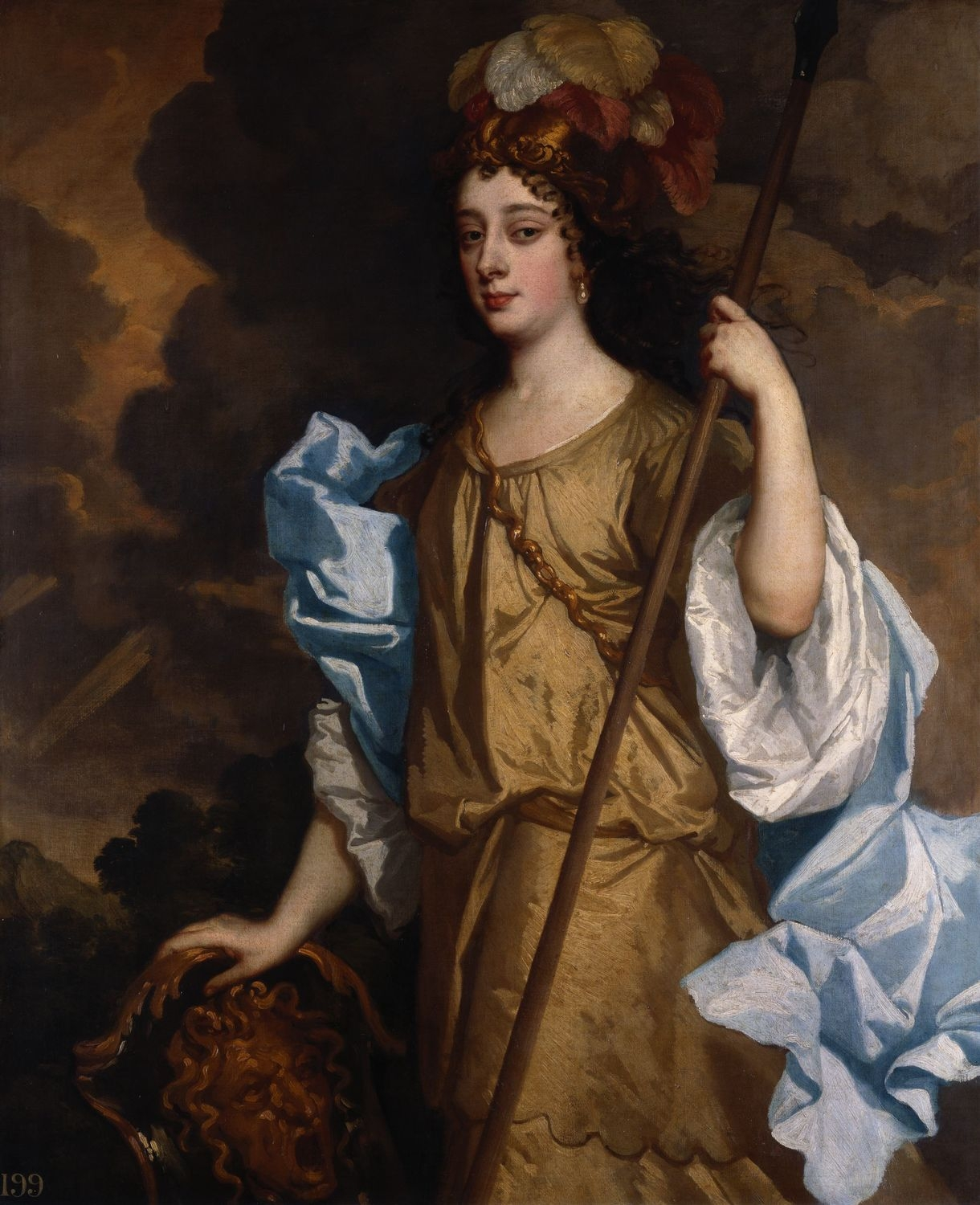
Barbara Palmer, 1st Duchess of Cleveland (c. 1665) (as Minerva)

== See also ==
- Hampton Court Beauties, a later set by Sir Godfrey Kneller, also on display at Hampton Court Palace
- Gallery of Beauties, a still later set in Munich
