= Hampton Court Beauties =

Painting series by Godfrey Kneller

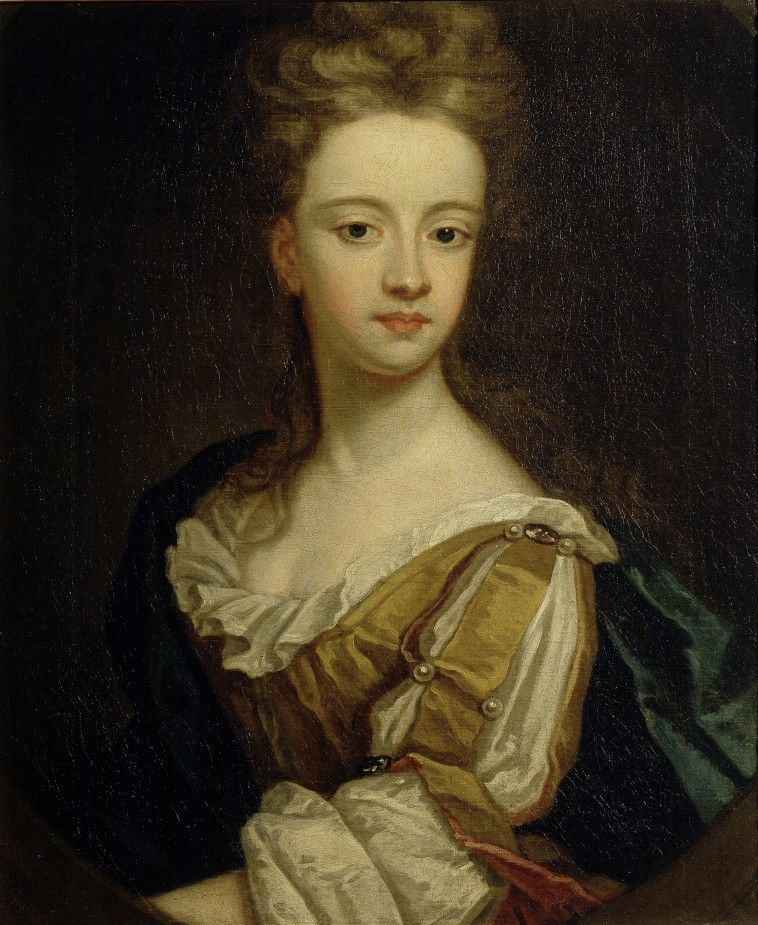
Hampton Court Beauty: Lady Mary Bentinck, c. 1700. Studio of Sir Godfrey Kneller

The Hampton Court Beauties are a series of eight portraits by German-born artist Sir Godfrey Kneller, commissioned by Queen Mary II, depicting the most glamorous ladies from her court. They adorn the private dining room of King William III at Hampton Court Palace.

They were probably originally commissioned to hang in the "water room" at the palace; however, after his wife's death in 1694, William III moved them to "the eating room downstairs" where they currently hang.

Hampton Court also houses the Windsor Beauties by Sir Peter Lely, depicting the most beautiful ladies from the court of King Charles II, a generation before. However, unlike the Windsor Beauties, the Hampton Court Beauties were not mistresses of the King, but attendants to the Queen. In contrast to the three quarter-sized Windsor Beauties, they are more formally posed, and full length. They are also of a plainer, less erotic style, reflecting a more moralistic society and the desire to "rebrand" the monarchy accordingly.

Later critics such as Hazlitt and Fuseli still found them problematic, Hazlitt describing them as "painted, tawdry". By 1835, the earlier set of "bold meretricious hussies" (Note: According to Charles Knight) had been sent from Windsor to join them at the more informal setting of Hampton Court. Both sets were part of the exhibition "The Wild, the Beautiful and the Damned" in 2012.

== List of the Beauties ==
Name	Life	Husband(s)	Year	Image
Isabella FitzRoy, Duchess of Grafton	(c. 1668–1723)	Henry FitzRoy, 1st Duke of Grafton (⚭ 1672–1690); Sir Thomas Hanmer, 4th Baronet (⚭ 1698)	1691	
Margaret Stawell, Baroness Stawell	(1672/1673–1728)	John Stawell, 2nd Baron Stawell (⚭ 1691–1692); Richard Jones, 1st Earl of Ranelagh (⚭ 1696–1712)	1690/1691	
Carey Mordaunt, Countess of Peterborough	(1658–1709)	Charles Mordaunt, 3rd Earl of Peterborough (⚭ 1678)	1690/1691	
Frances, Lady Myddleton	(1666–1695)	Sir Richard Myddelton, 3rd Baronet (⚭ c. 1686)	1690/1691	
Mary Scrope	(1676 – ?)	John Pitt (⚭ 1701)	1691	
Lady Diana de Vere	(c. 1679–1742)	Charles Beauclerk, 1st Duke of St Albans (⚭ 1694–1726)	1691	
Lady Mary Bentinck	(1679–1726)	Algernon Capell, 2nd Earl of Essex (⚭ 1692–1710); Rt Hon. Sir Conyers Darcy (⚭ 1714)	1690/1691	
Mary Sackville, Countess of Dorset	(1669–1691)	Charles Sackville, 6th Earl of Dorset (⚭ 1685)	1690/1691	

== See also ==
- Gallery of Beauties
