= William Whitmore (died 1648) =

English landowner and politician

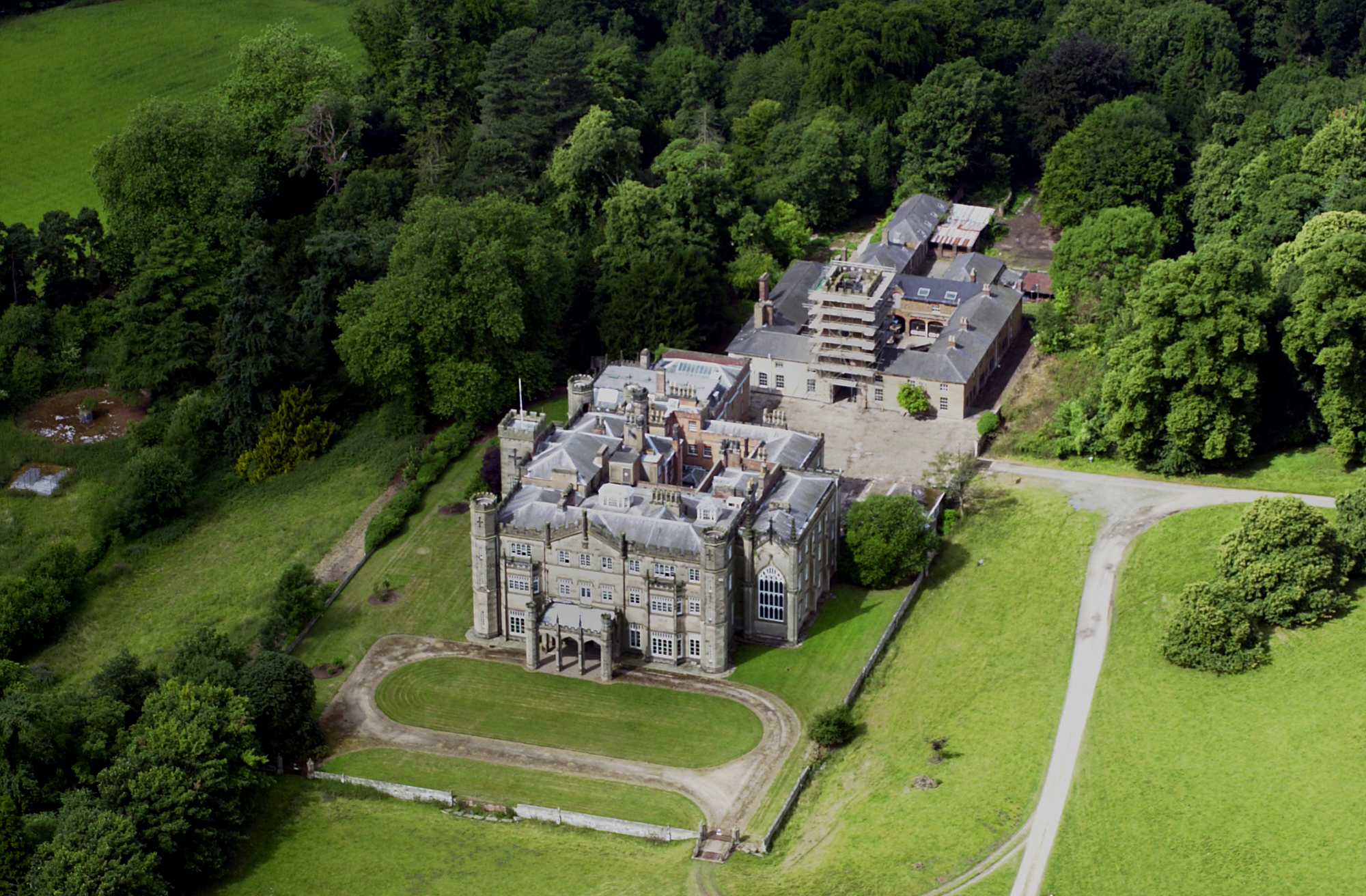
Apley Hall, Shropshire, entirely remodelled since the 17th century

Sir William Whitmore (4 November 1573 – before 24 January 1648) was an English landowner and politician who sat in the House of Commons at various times between 1621 and 1626.

== Biography ==
Whitmore was the eldest son, and heir, of William Whitmore (died 1593), citizen and Haberdasher of London, and his wife Anne Bond (died 1615), daughter of Alderman William Bond, Haberdasher (died 1576).

== Career ==
William Whitmore and his younger brother (Sir) George Whitmore, Haberdasher, both had public civic careers in London. He is provisionally identified as the William Whitmore who matriculated sizar from Trinity College, Cambridge at Michaelmas 1588, and was certainly admitted to the Middle Temple on 1 February 1594/95.

William inherited an estate including property at Apley, Shropshire after his father's death in 1593, though he still had to reach majority before receiving it. After his term in the Middle Temple he married (first) Margaret Moseley, daughter of Rowland Moseley of Hough, Lancashire (son of Sir Nicholas Mosley), and had a son and daughter. Margaret died in 1608 and he married (secondly, in 1610) Dorothy, daughter of John Weld, Haberdasher, and niece of Sir Humphrey Weld, Lord Mayor of London 1608–1609, whose son Sir John Weld was married to Whitmore's sister Frances.

William's inheritance was the foundation of his wealth, but it was as a Contractor for Crown Lands, 1609–1616, and a farmer of customs, in association with Sir Arthur Ingram and others, and then in further lending schemes, that he was able greatly to extend the original estate. He is thought to have been responsible for the arrangement of a surviving MS ledger in around 1617-1618 compiling transcripts of 181 evidences relating to his land-holdings, including lands acquired from Sir Thomas Lucy of Charlecote Park.

He was Sheriff of Shropshire in 1620. In 1621, he was elected Member of Parliament for Bridgnorth. He was knighted at Greenwich on 24 or 28 June 1621. In 1624 he was re-elected MP for Bridgnorth. He was elected MP for Bridgnorth again in 1626.

In 1624 the theologian Thomas Gataker (1574-1654) published a volume Iacobs Thankfulnesse to God, for Gods Goodness to Iacob, dedicated jointly to Sir William and Sir George Whitmore, opening his address by stating that their mother had presented him and spoken for him at baptism, as his godmother. He goes on to say that she continued to support him, making bequests to him in her will. His texts, which concern the promise that God will advance the temporal affairs of those who attend to the spiritual, are, he says, "to egge you on, whom God hath blessed with so large a portion of his bounty, unto those religious offices", and are an expansion of a lecture formerly delivered to the Worshipful Company of Haberdashers when one of them was Master of the Company. He develops his theme to explore differences between their own theology and that of the Romanists.

Whitmore died before 24 January 1648 at the age of 75. His son Thomas Whitmore was an MP of Royalist sympathy and was created a baronet in 1641.

== Family ==
Sir William had children by both of his marriages. By the first, to Margaret Moseley, were

- George Whitmore, died without issue
- Anne Whitmore (died 1666), married Sir Edmund Sawyer.

By the second marriage, to Dorothy Weld (who died in 1626), were

- Sir Thomas Whitmore, 1st Baronet, MP, son and heir (1612-1653), married Elizabeth (died 1666), daughter and heir of alderman Sir William Acton (1570-1651). Sir Thomas was succeeded by his son, Sir William Whitmore, 2nd Baronet (1637-1699).
- William Whitmore, died young
- Richard Whitmore (1614-1667), of Lower Slaughter, Gloucestershire, married Catherine (died 1673), daughter and coheir of Robert Deards, Esq., of London. Their son, Richard, of Lower Slaughter, married Anne, daughter of Sir John Weld of Willey, Shropshire.

Parliament of England
| Preceded by John Pierse; Richard Singe | Member of Parliament for Bridgnorth; 1621–1624; With: Sir John Hayward; George Smith | Succeeded by Walter Acton; John Bennet |
| Preceded by Walter Acton; John Bennet | Member of Parliament for Bridgnorth; 1626; With: John Bennet | Succeeded by Sir Richard Shelton; Sir George Paul |
