= Sir Edward Acton, 1st Baronet =

English MP

- Born: July 20, 1600
- Died: June 29, 1659
- Occupation: politician

Sir Edward Acton, 1st Baronet (baptised 20 July 1600 – buried 29 June 1659) was an English MP for Bridgnorth and High Sheriff of Shropshire, who supported the Royalist cause during the English Civil War.

== Biography ==
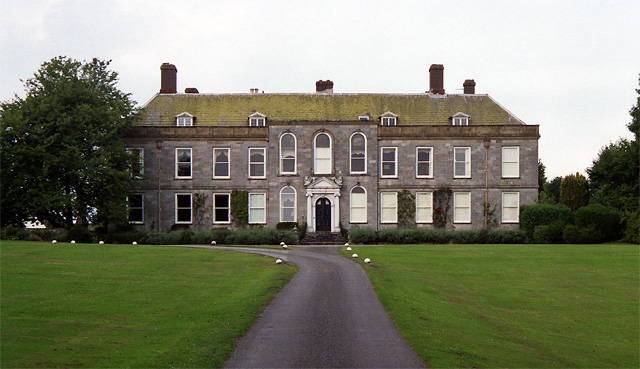
Aldenham Park, Morville, Shropshire

He was born the son of Sir Walter Acton of Aldenham Park and Frances Acton, near Bridgnorth, Shropshire. He was created 1st Baronet Acton of Aldenham (Aldenham Hall, in Morville), Shropshire on 17 January 1643 (1644?).

He married Sarah Mytton, daughter of Richard Mytton and Margaret Owen, in 1624.

Sir Edward was a Royalist during the English Civil War and fought at the Battle of Edgehill and the Siege of Bridgnorth.

Sir Edward was MP for Bridgnorth twice, first one from April 1640 to May 1640, the second one between November 1640 and 5 February 1644 during the Long and Short Parliaments and also sat in King Charles I's Parliament at Oxford.

He died c. June 1659 and was buried on 29 June 1659.

== Family ==
He married Sarah Mytton, sister of the parliamentarian general Thomas Mytton, and they had the following children:

- Sir Walter Acton, 2nd Baronet (1621–1665)
- Edward Acton (1622–1654)
- Thomas Acton (1623–1677)
- Frances Acton (1625–1626)
- Robert Acton (1628–1654)
- William Acton (1629–1659)
- Richard Acton (1633–1674)

== Heirs to the title ==
- Sir Edward Acton, 1st Baronet, MP for Bridgnorth 1640 and 1640–1644 (1600–1659)
- Sir Walter Acton, 2d Baronet, MP for Bridgnorth 1660 (1620–1655)
- Sir Edward Acton, 3d Baronet, MP for Bridgnorth 1689–1705 (1650–1716)
- Sir Whitmore Acton, 4th Baronet, MP for Bridgnorth 1710–1713 (1678–1732)
- Sir Richard Acton, 5th Baronet (1712–1791)
- Sir John Francis Edward Acton, 6th Baronet (1736-1811)

== Sources ==
- Leigh Rayment's list of baronets
- Leigh Rayment's Historical List of MPs

Parliament of England
Vacant Parliament suspended since 1629	Member of Parliament for Bridgnorth; 1640–1644 with Thomas Whitmore	Vacant Title next held by Robert Clive; Robert Charlton
Baronetage of England
New creation	Baronet (of Aldenham); 1644–1659	Succeeded by Sir Walter Acton
