= Sir Walter Acton, 2nd Baronet =

English landowner, politician

Sir Walter Acton, 2nd Baronet (c. 1621 – 1665) was an English landowner and politician who sat in the House of Commons in 1660.

== Life ==
Acton was the son of Sir Edward Acton, 1st Baronet of Aldenham and his wife Sarah Mytton, who was the only daughter of Richard Mytton of Halston and sister of the Civil War parliamentarian general Thomas Mytton. He succeeded to the baronetcy and Aldenham Park on the death of his father on 29 June 1659.

Although his father was an active Royalist, he was elected Member of Parliament for Bridgnorth in the Convention Parliament of 1660 in disregard of the Long Parliament ordinance. He was J.P. for Shropshire from July 1660 and commissioner for assessment from September 1660. In October 1660, he was a lieutenant in the volunteers cavalry. He was commissioner for loyal and indigent officers in 1662 and commissioner for corporations from 1662 to 1663. He became Deputy Lieutenant in 1662.

Acton was buried at Morville, Shropshire on 3 September 1665.

== Family ==
Acton married Catherine Cresset, daughter of Richard Cresset of Cound, before 1650 and they had the following children:

- Sir Edward Acton, 3rd Baronet (1649–1716)
- Walter Acton (1651 – 11 March 1718), great grandfather of Sir John Acton, 6th Baronet
- Richard Acton (1653 – 14 March 1705)
- Thomas Acton (1654–1684)
- William Acton (b. 1654)
- Robert Acton (1655 - Bef 1695)
- Francis Acton (1657 – 24 August 1733), Director of the South Sea Company (Aug 1712 – Feb 1715)
- Catherine Acton
- Elizabeth Acton
- Sarah Acton

Parliament of England
| Preceded by Not represented in the Rump previously Edmund Waring; John Humphrys | Member of Parliament for Bridgnorth; 1660–1660; With: John Bennet | Succeeded by William Whitmore; Thomas Whitmore |
Baronetage of England
| Preceded by Edward Acton | Baronet (of Aldenham); 1659–1665 | Succeeded by Edward Acton |
