= Listed buildings in Acton Round =

Acton Round is a civil parish in Shropshire, England. It contains five listed buildings that are recorded in the National Heritage List for England. Of these, one is listed at Grade I, the highest of the three grades, one is at Grade II*, the middle grade, and the others are at Grade II, the lowest grade. The parish contains the villages of Acton Round and Muckley, and is otherwise completely rural. The most important building in the parish is Acton Round Hall; this and two associated structures are listed. The other listed buildings are a church and a farmhouse.

== Key ==
Grade	Criteria
I	Buildings of exceptional interest, sometimes considered to be internationally important
II*	Particularly important buildings of more than special interest
II	Buildings of national importance and special interest

== Buildings ==
Name and location	Photograph	Date	Notes	Grade
St Mary's Church; 52.55733°N 2.54064°W		Late 12th century	The chancel was rebuilt in 1714 for Sir Whitmore Acton, the north chapel was added in 1763, and the church was restored in 1895. It is built mainly in grey siltstone, the porch is in brick, and the roof is tiled with ridge tiles. The church consists of a nave, a south porch, a north chapel, and a lower and narrower chancel with a north vestry. On the west gable is a square timber weatherboarded belfry with a pyramidal roof and a weathervane. In the porch is a cruck truss. The south and east windows in the chancel, dating from 1895, have red sandstone surrounds and contain Decorated tracery.	II*
Muckley Cross Farm House; 52.56080°N 2.52291°W	—	1708	The farmhouse is in brick with a string course and a tiled roof. It has two storeys and an attic, and a front of three bays. The doorway has a bracketed hood and a rectangular fanlight. The windows are casements, and above the central bay is a gablet.	II
Acton Round Hall; 52.55682°N 2.53820°W		1713–14	The hall was built as a dower house for Aldenham Park by Sir Whitmore Acton. It is in Queen Anne style, and built in red brick with stone dressings, rusticated pilasters, a modillioned eaves cornice, and a hipped slate roof. There are two storeys and cellars, and a symmetrical front of seven bays, with five bays on the sides. On the front and back the central three bays project slightly, and contain a stone doorcase with Doric pilasters and a segmental pediment. At the rear there is also a central pediment above a round-arched window. The windows are sashes, in the south front is a round-headed stair window, and in the roof are three pedimented dormers.	I
Gate piers, Acton Round Hall; 52.55694°N 2.53799°W	—	18th century	The gate piers are to the northeast of the hall. They are in brick and have a square plan, and are surmounted by stone urn finials.	II
Outbuildings, Acton Round Hall; 52.55629°N 2.53795°W		18th century (probable)	The two adjoining outbuildings are to the southeast of the hall. The larger building is in brick with two storeys, and to the north is a stone building with one storey. Both have tiled roofs.	II
