= William Whitmore (died 1593) =

London merchant (died 1593)

William Whitmore (died 1593), was a citizen and Haberdasher of London.

== Biography ==
William was a wealthy haberdasher in London, becoming very wealthy with the Spanish textile trade, he purchased the estate of Apley Hall in 1572.

William married Anne Bond (died 1615), daughter of Alderman William Bond, Haberdasher (died 1576).

== Family ==
The children of William Whitmore and Anne Bond were:

- Sir William Whitmore (born 1573)
- Sir Thomas Whitmore, died 1612
- Sir George Whitmore, born after 1572, died 1654
- Elizabeth Whitmore, married Sir William Craven (1548–1618)
- Anne Whitmore, married F. Baber, of Chute, Wiltshire
- Margaret Whitmore, married Sir John St John, of Lydiard Tregoze, Wiltshire
- Mary Whitmore (c. 1575–1652), married Sir Charles Montagu of Boughton
- Francis Whitmore, married Sir John Weld (1582–1622) of Arnolds, Edmonton, Middlesex
- Jane, married Nathaniel Still, Esq., son of Bishop John Still
