= John Bennet (MP) =

English landowner and politician

John Bennet (10 January 1628 – 16 May 1663) was an English landowner and politician who sat in the House of Commons from 1660 to 1663.

Bennet was the eldest surviving son of John Bennet, merchant of St. Stephen's Walbrook, London and his wife Joane Mill, daughter of William Mill of St. Clement Danes. His father died in 1631. He was a student of Gray's Inn in 1642. In 1652 he bought Great Abington from the Earl of Northampton. He was a J.P. for Cambridgeshire from 1657 until his death. In 1660, he was elected Member of Parliament for Bridgnorth in the Convention Parliament. He was a Gentleman pensioner from June 1660 to 1662 and a commissioner for assessment from September 1660 to 1662. In 1661, he was re-elected MP for Bridgnorth for the Cavalier Parliament. He was a gentleman of the privy chamber and also commissioner for corporations from 1662 until his death.

Bennet died at the age of 35 and was buried in the Mercers’ Chapel, London.

Bennet married Elizabeth Whitmore, daughter of Sir Thomas Whitmore, 1st Baronet of Apley Park, Shropshire on 5 April 1654 and had one son who was later MP for Newton.

Parliament of England
Preceded by Not represented in Restored Rump	Member of Parliament for Bridgnorth; 1660–1663; With: Sir Walter Acton	Succeeded by Sir William Whitmore, 2nd Baronet; Sir Thomas Whitmore
