= Morville =

Morville may refer to several places in Europe :

== Belgium ==
- Morville, Belgium, a part of Florennes in the province of Namur

== England ==
- Morville, Shropshire, a civil parish near Bridgnorth, Shropshire
  - Morville Hall, a country house in Morville, Shropshire

== France ==
- Morville, Manche, in the Manche département
- Morville, Vosges, in the Vosges département
- Morville-en-Beauce, in the Loiret département
- Morville-lès-Vic, in the Moselle département
- Morville-sur-Andelle, in the Seine-Maritime département
- Morville-sur-Nied, in the Moselle département
- Morville-sur-Seille, in the Meurthe-et-Moselle département
