= Sir John Weld =

Sir John Weld may refer to:

- John Weld (merchant) (1582–1623), English landowner and London merchant
- John Weld (politician) (1613–1681), English politician
