= John Weld =

John Weld may refer to:

- John Weld (writer) (1905–2003), American newspaper reporter and writer
- Sir John Weld (merchant) (1582–1623), English landowner and London merchant
- Sir John Weld (politician) (1613–1681), English politician
