= Sir Richard Acton, 5th Baronet =

English baronet

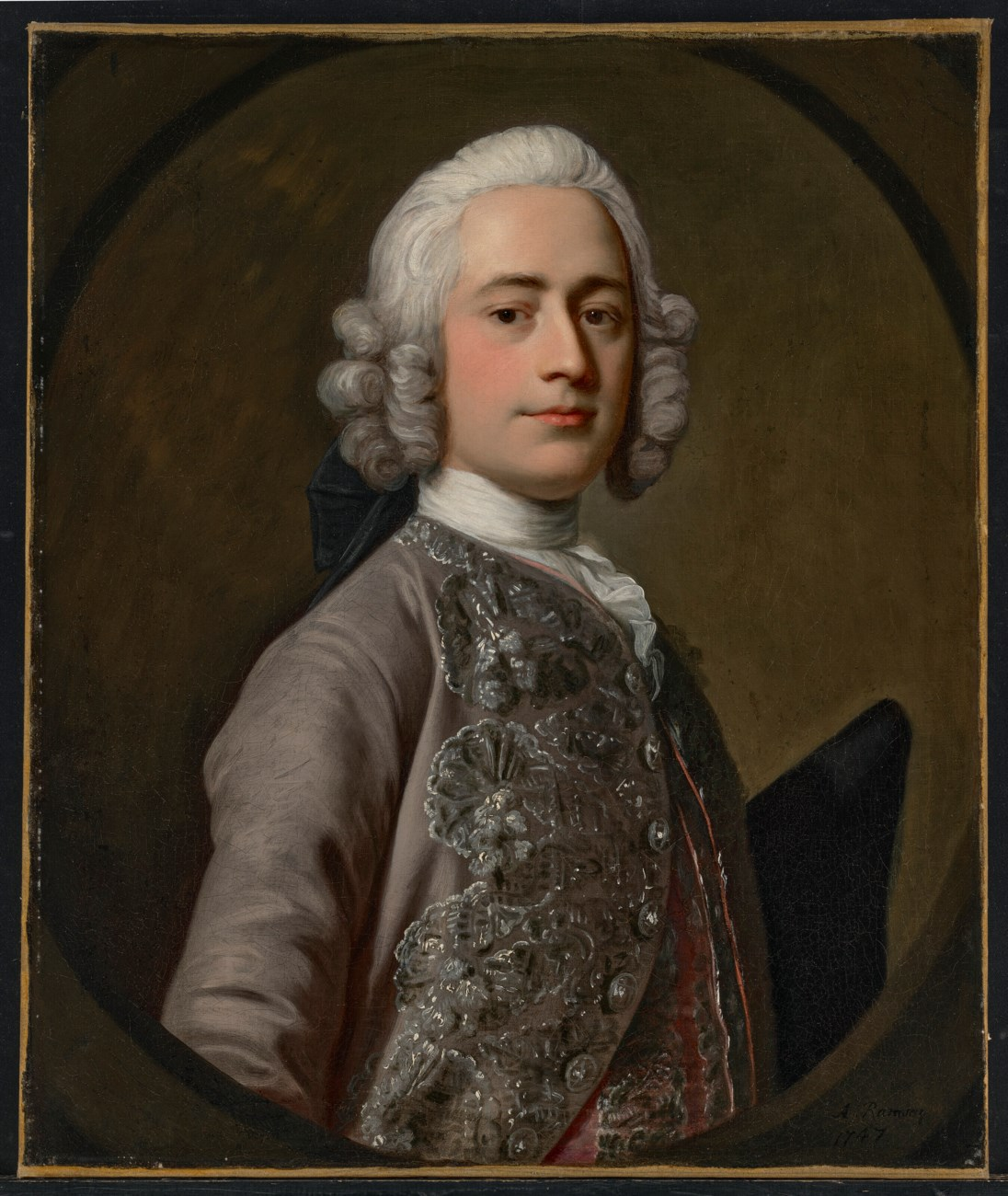
- portrait by Allan Ramsay
- Born: 1 January 1712
- Died: 20 November 1791 (aged 79)
- Spouse(s): Anne Grey
- Children: 2
- Parent(s): Whitmore Acton; Elizabeth Gibbon
- Position held: High Sheriff of Shropshire (1751–1751)

Sir Richard Acton, 5th Baronet (1 January 1712 – 20 November 1791) was an English baronet.

== Life ==
The son of Sir Whitmore Acton, 4th Baronet, he succeeded to the baronetcy and Aldenham Park on the death of his father.

He held the office of High Sheriff of Shropshire for 1751–52.

He is buried at Acton Round, Shropshire.

As he had no surviving male issue, the title went to his distant cousin, Sir John Acton.

== Family ==
He married Lady Anne Grey, daughter of Harry Grey, 3rd Earl of Stamford on 21 September 1744, and they had the following children:

- Elizabeth Acton (1745–1802), married Philip Langdale, of Houghton, Yorkshire. No issue.
- Frances Acton (1749–1762)

Baronetage of England
Preceded by Whitmore Acton	Baronet (of Aldenham); 1731/32–1791	Succeeded by John Acton
