= New England Countryside Sites =

Historic site in Shropshire, England

Coordinates: 52°27′05″N 2°24′17″W

New England countryside site is an historic site in Shropshire, United Kingdom, of the former village of New England. It is located between the villages of Highley and Billingsley.

== About ==
The New England area of Shropshire appears to have been continuously used and settled for least 1000 years. In the 19th century, it was a small industrial community

The Heritage Lottery Fund, and the Highley Initiative have funded research, excavation and restoration of historical features at New England. In 2007, a community archaeology group investigated the overgrown tree lined mound that included a row of demolished terrace cottages. It confirmed that the structure aligned east of the terraced cottages was probably a nineteenth century addition to the end cottage. Other remains found also include a 19th-century pathway, garden, and a drain co-existent to the building.

In 2012, the historic Donkey Bridge, named because it was once part of a packhorse route, was closed temporarily due to flood damage.

== Bird watching, and wildlife ==
New England is situated in a wooded valley making it a good site for wildlife such as insects, and birds. In 2010, 44 of 53 nestboxes put up at the site were used, resulting in the successful raising of 352 young fledglings, versus 306 in 2009. The young birds raised included a pair of stock doves which nested in one of the three owl boxes put up. Sightings of Mandarin ducks on the stream meant that three new large nestboxes suitable for them have been put up.
