= Rebecca Romney =

London-based investor (–1644)

Rebecca Romney (died 1644) was a London based investor.

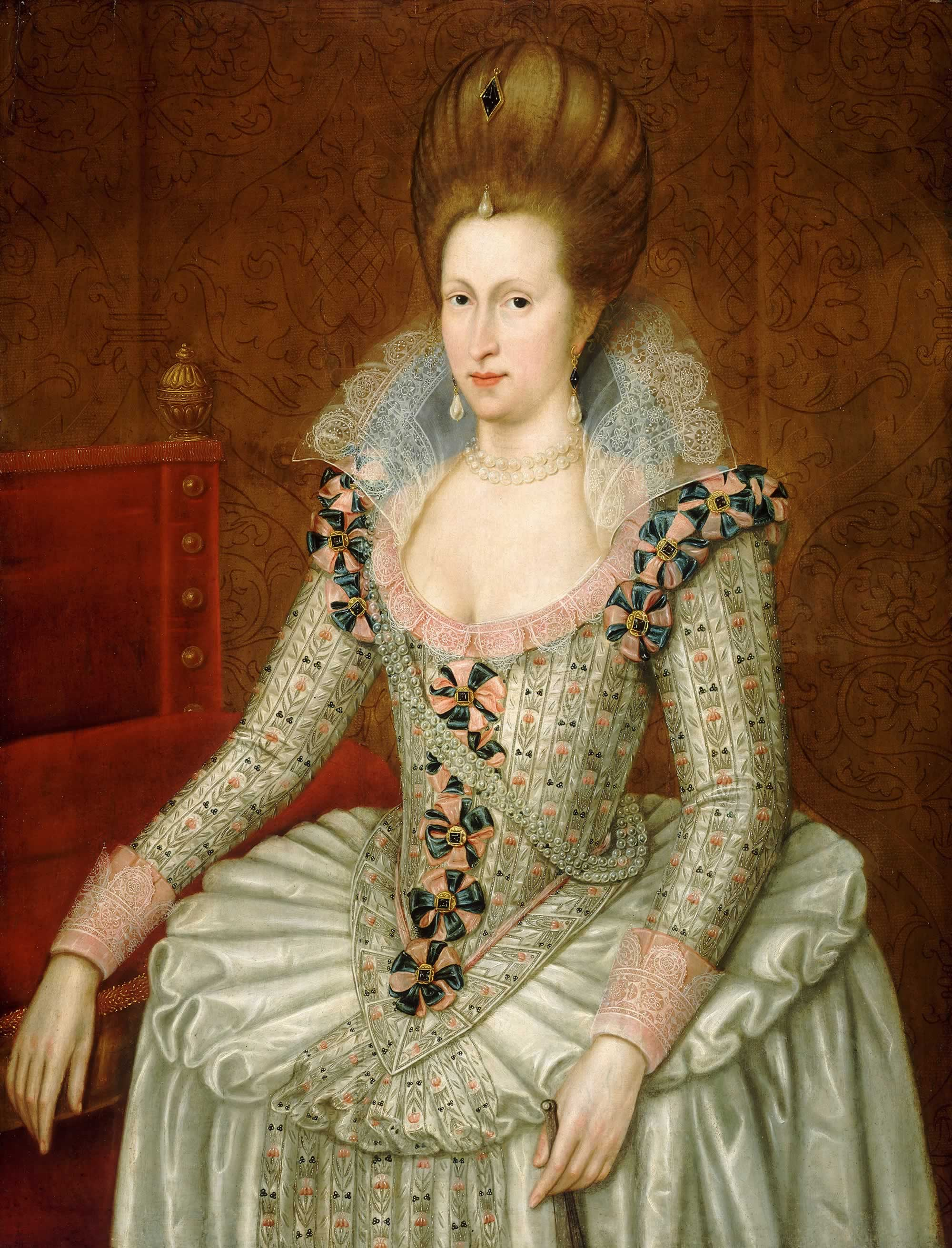
Lady Romney took some jewels of Anne of Denmark to be pawned for a loan

== Family background ==
She was a daughter of Robert Taylor, a London merchant, and Elizabeth, daughter of Hugh Hatton of Cheshire. Robert Taylor was Sheriff of London with the haberdasher John Garrard in 1593. After his death, Elizabeth married James Danvers of London.

== Marriage and widowhood ==
Rebecca married the London haberdasher and merchant adventurer Sir William Romney of Ironmonger Lane (died 1611). He was a governor of the English East India Company. His family was from Tetbury, where his executors founded a school. The phrasing of his will shows that he was a committed Puritan.

An edition of Paul Baynes's A helpe to true happinesse includes a dedication to "the Lady Rebecca Romeney" from her "loving Nephew. E. C.", Ezekiel Charke. Baynes's Christian Letters were similarly dedicated by Charke to Elizabeth, Lady Lennard, a daughter of the Lord Mayor of London, Stephen Slaney, and Mary, Lady Weld, widow of the Lord Mayor, Sir Humphrey Weld, acquaintances of Charke who were probably well known to Lady Romney. Charke's wife Margaret was a daughter of Richard Hooker.

Henry Hudson named the "Romney Islands" near Cape Smith north of Mosquito Bay (Nunavut) after her or her husband. After the death of her husband, Rebecca, Lady Romney, was named among the "Merchants Discoverers of the North-West Passage" in a charter granted to that company by James VI and I on 26 July 1612. Prince Henry was "Supreme Protector" of the Company of Discoverers, according to the grant made to the investors, including Lady Romney, in July 1612. The grant narrates the sixth voyage of the partnership, when Henry Hudson sailed in search of a passage by the North-West of America to the "Sea of Suz" or South Sea to China, Japan, and the Philippines.

Rebecca Romney was the "Lady Rommeny" of "Fishmonger Lane" involved with George Abercromby, a gentleman of the queen's robes, and the goldsmith George Heriot, in pawning one of the jewels of Anne of Denmark in March 1613 for £1,200. Anonymous city investors petitioned Anne of Denmark in 1610 to intercede with James VI and I to fund the search for a northern passage to China and Japan. Anne of Denmark has been linked with voyages of discovery and investment in voyages by aristocratic women in her close circle, while Romney had her own connections with commerce in the city.

Rebecca Romney, as a philanthropist, founded four exhibitions (scholarships) for the sons of haberdashers in 1629, two at Emmanuel College, Cambridge and two at Sidney Sussex College, Cambridge. She also loaned money to the Virginia Company, and this has been connected with a charitable initiative to send poor children from London to the colony.

== Family ==
Her children included:

- Joseph Romney (died 1646)
- William Romney, who married Margaret Bowater
- Isaac Romney, who was admitted to Gray's Inn on 7 February 1604, as a reward for helping to save the building from fire.
- Daniel Romney (died 1635)
- Susanna Romney, who married Sir Francis Carew (died 1649) of Beddington and Walton-on-the-Hill
- Elizabeth Romney, who married Sir John Wild or Weld of Willey, Shropshire, and was the mother of John Weld MP.
