= Morville Priory =

Former Benedictine monastery in Shropshire, England

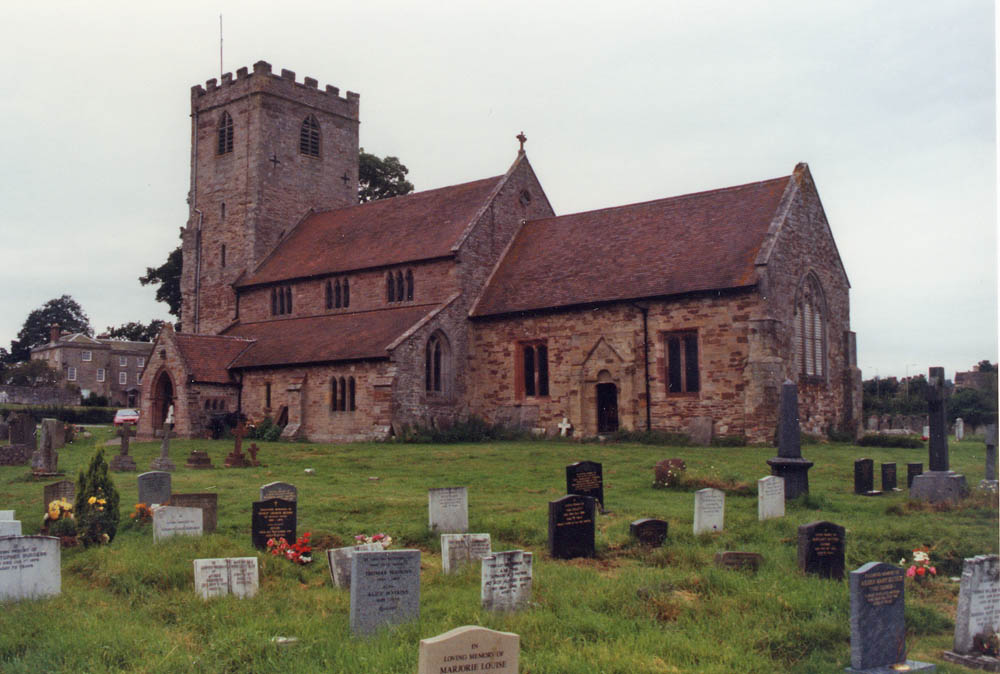
- St Gregory's church, Morville, once the centre of a very large parish and the church to which the priory was attached.

- Location within Shropshire

Monastery information
- Order: Benedictine
- Established: 1138
- Disestablished: 1540
- Mother house: Shrewsbury Abbey
- Dedication: Gregory the Great
- Diocese: Hereford
- Controlled churches: Billingsley; Oldbury; Tasley; Aston Eyre; Astley Abbotts

Site
- Coordinates: 52.5419°N 2.4886°W
- Website: St Gregory the Great, Morville, at achurchnearyou.com

Morville Priory was a small Benedictine monastery in Shropshire, England, a cell of Shrewsbury Abbey.

== Location ==
Today, Morville is a hamlet on the road between Bridgnorth and Much Wenlock, with Morville Hall, owned by the National Trust, as the most prominent feature. The priory occupied a site associated with the parish church, which today lies just east of Morville Hall. In the Domesday Book, under the name 'Membrefelde, it was the caput or chief place of the Hundred of Alnodestreu, by the standards of the time a fairly large settlement of 22 or more households. Unlike Shrewsbury Abbey itself, which was in the Diocese of Coventry and Lichfield, Morville was and remains in the Diocese of Hereford.

== Origins ==
The origins of the priory at Morville lie in the earlier parish church. There was a collegiate church or minster at Morville, dedicated to St Gregory and served by eight canons, in the reign of Edward the Confessor and conceivably earlier. The canons were supported by eight hides, perhaps divided between them in something like a prebendal structure. After the Norman Conquest the church fell within the territories of Roger de Montgomery, the Earl of Shrewsbury, and he granted some of the lands to his own chaplains. He gave the entire church to Shrewsbury Abbey some time between its foundation in 1083 and the inauguration of monastic life in 1087. He prescribed that the prebends should revert to the abbey as the canons died or otherwise vacated them. Domesday Book in 1086 found Morville a substantial settlement with 25 villein households, 7 smallholders and 2 slaves. Five hides were now in the hands of the abbey. Earl Roger's chaplains still held three hides between them, with five men holding the land from them. It is the only church in Alnodestreu specifically mentioned by Domesday, so it seems that the entire hundred constituted a single parish.

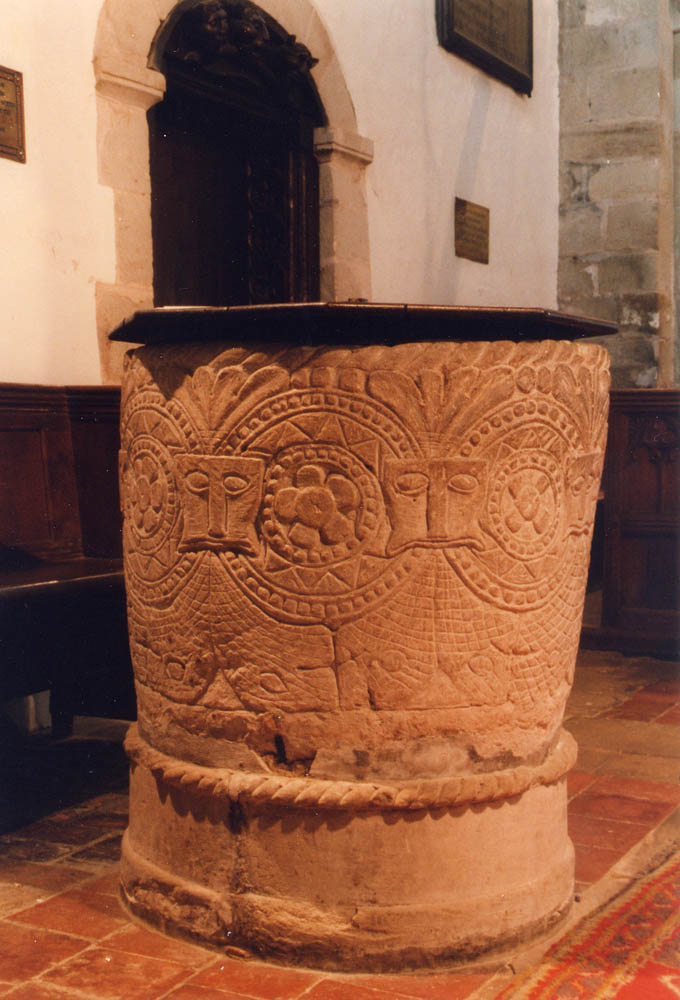
Font of St Gregory's, Morville, considered possibly of Norman date, but with later additions.

The reversion of the church lands to Shrewsbury Abbey did not go smoothly. One of the chaplains, a Norman named Richard de Mesnilhermer, died in the early 12th century. Before death, he had been admitted as a monk of Shrewsbury. Nevertheless, his son Hubert raised a claim to Richard's prebend by right of inheritance. Henry I issued a precept to Richard de Belmeis I, who was Bishop of London but also a Shropshire man with viceregal responsibilities in the Welsh Marches, to hear the case. The notice was witnessed by, among others, Alan fitz Flaad, Roger Corbet and Hamo Peverel, suggesting that it was issued in Shropshire during a royal visit. The abbey's cause was upheld in the subsequent trial.

Shrewsbury Abbey was now entirely responsible for ensuring that worship was offered in the parish, whether by presenting an incumbent or sending monks to officiate. In 1118 the church was rebuilt and rededicated by Geoffrey de Clive, the Bishop of Hereford. The chronicle ascribed to Florence of Worcester describes a tragedy that happened after the dedication.

Latin	English
Ecclesia apud Momerfeld a Gosfrido Herefordensi episcopo dedicata, omnes qui ad dedicationem venerant, domum redibant; verum post aeris serenitatem, quae prius extiterat maxima, repente cum tonitru orta est tempestas nimia, qua perculsi quidam in itinere, dum loco in quem devenerant cedere non valerent, subsistebant. Erant numero quinque, tres viri et duae foeminae, quarum una ictu fulmineo percussa occubuit, altera vero ab umbilico usque ad pedum vestigia misere percussa et ignita decidit, viris duntaxat vix vitae reservatis. Quinque etiam caballi illorum fulmine perculsi interierunt.	After the dedication of the church of Momerfield, by Geoffrey, bishop of Hereford, all who had attended the consecration turned their steps homeward; but although the atmosphere had been remarkably calm up to that time, a violent storm of thunder and lightning suddenly arose, and some of them, overtaken by it on the road, and not being able to retreat from the spot they had reached, halted there. They were five in number, three men and two women; one of the latter was killed by a stroke of lightning, and the other, being scorched by the flash from the navel to the soles of the feet, perished miserably, the men only narrowly escaping with their lives. Their five horses were also struck with the lightning, and killed.

It was not until 1138 that the church definitively became a priory. This came about through its appropriation by Shrewsbury Abbey, a procedure that allowed the abbey to take the annual tithes of the church. This was allowed by Bishop Robert de Bethune in 1138, in sympathy with what he saw as the needs of the abbey in serving the parish, and with the injunction that there should be a colony of monks from Shrewsbury. These were to be changed at the Abbot of Shrewsbury's discretion, so that there could be "a full discharge of the duties of hospitality there, in proportion to the local means." This meant that the abbey was to maintain a guest house for the Bishop of Hereford, bringing in catering and housekeeping staff where necessary.

== History and functioning ==
The various manors of the parish were already in the process of acquiring their own chapels, some of which became parish churches in their own right, leaving the parish of Morville steadily smaller and more manageable, obviating the need for a large complement of monks. In addition to its endowment of land, the church at Morville brought the abbey several other small incomes, including 6s. 8d. each from the chapels of Billingsley and Oldbury and 5s. from the chapel at Tasley. The advowson of the chapel at Aston Eyre, founded around the beginning of the Anarchy by Robert Fitz Aer to improve pastoral provision in the parish, was contested and won by the abbey around 1190 and thereafter yielded 8s. annually: in the next century it was appropriated by the abbey and merged entirely with Morville. The chapel at Astley Abbotts was appropriated around 1219 specifically to improve hospitality at Morville. However, all these revenues went in the first instance to Shrewsbury Abbey. Only very small revenues went straight to Morville. An example is the 15d. annual rent given in the mid-13th century by the widow Sibil of Haughton to the priory, of which it was obliged to devote 2d. to lighting for the church.

As well as taking the revenues, the abbey also appointed the prior at Morville: the priory was not even semi-independent, but an integral part of the convent of Shrewsbury. As such, they played an active part in the affairs of the abbey. In 1220, for example, one John, the first named prior of Morville, acted as attorney for the abbot in a property case. At the election of a new abbot in 1460, William Ball the prior took part alongside other monks of Shrewsbury. It seems that there were never more than two or three monks in the priory. In at least one case the prior seems to have supplemented their diet illegally: in the 1250s prior John Wallensis was alleged to have brought part of a hind into the priory but he died before the case could come before the Justice in Eyre. In 1372 the prior was the only monk, essentially just a local administrator for the abbot, collecting rents and tithes, and dealing with the dependent chapels. However, the priory did function effectively as a diocesan guest house, although the bishops had to pay their way. Bishop Richard Swinefield's expense accounts have survived, showing that he stayed at Morville on 20 April 1290. He and his entourage had 35 horses, which had to be fed on oats and hay, while they themselves ate poultry and pork.

== Decline and dissolution ==
Morville priory seems to have dwindled in the abbey's final decades. It was commonly referred to as a mere grange. The prior was the only monk in 1518 and in 1521. Richard Baker, also known as Marshall or Marciale, resigned the abbacy in December 1528 and retired to Morville, where he appeared as prior the following year, staying until the dissolution of the monasteries finally caught up with Shrewsbury Abbey in 1540. The abbey assigned him a pension of £40 by a deed dated 22 October 1529, and in order to raise the sum granted him the priory itself, with all its temporalities and spiritualities. The priory remained his for life after the Dissolution, although the reversion was granted to John Dudley on 4 December 1545. A valuation carried out by royal commission in July of that year had put the revenues of the priory at £30 0s. 9d. However, the outgoings, mainly the salaries of the curates of Morville and Wheaton Aston, reduced the net value to £16 10s. 10¾d. Baker seems not to have lived there and spent his later years in Bridgnorth, where he died in 1558. Dudley meanwhile seems to have sold the reversion to Roger Smyth of Bridgnorth.
