= Sir Edward Acton, 3rd Baronet =

British MP

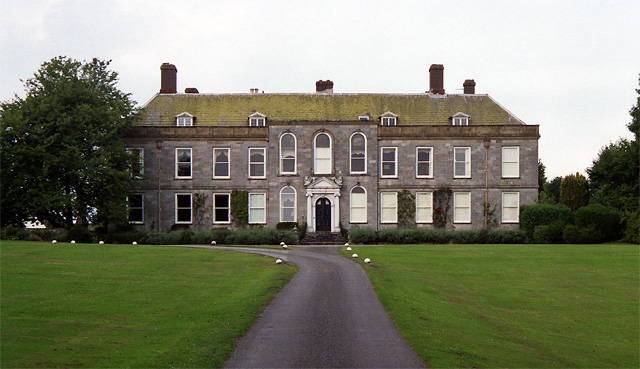
Aldenham Park

Sir Edward Acton, 3rd Baronet (c. 1650 – 28 September 1716) was a British MP.

He was born the son of Sir Walter Acton, 2nd Baronet and succeeded to the baronetcy and Aldenham Park near Bridgnorth on the death of his father in 1665.

He was educated at Queen's College, Oxford, where he was awarded MA on 4 May 1666 and entered the Inner Temple in 1670 to study law. He became a barrister and Tory Member of Parliament for Bridgnorth from 1689 until 1705. He commenced the rebuilding of Aldenham Park in the late 17th century.

He was a freeman in Bridgnorth in 1673, in Much Wenlock in 1676 and in Ludlow in 1697. He held the office of High Sheriff of Shropshire for 1684–85 and was appointed Recorder of Bridgnorth in 1701. He retained his seat in the six succeeding Parliaments, generally voting with the Tories.

== Family ==
He died in 1716 and was buried at Morville. He had married heiress Mary Walter, daughter of John Walter of Elberton, esquire of Somersetshire, on 8 December 1674 and with her had the following children:

- Sir Whitmore Acton, 4th Bt. (1678 – January 1732)
- Mary Acton (born 1678)
- Edward Acton (1681–1741)
- John Acton (born 1687)
- Sarah Acton
- Elizabeth Acton (1683-1738)
- Frances Acton (died 29 October 1718)
- Catherine Acton

== Sources ==
- Leigh Rayment's list of baronets
- Leigh Rayment's Historical List of MPs
- Robert Walcott, English Politics in the Early Eighteenth Century (Oxford: Oxford University Press, 1956)
- David Hayton, "The Country Party in the House of Commons 1698-1699: a Forecast of the Opposition to a Standing Army?", Parliamentary History, Volume 6 (1987), 141-63

Parliament of England
Preceded by William Whitmore; Roger Pope	Member of Parliament for Bridgnorth; 1698–1705; With: Humphrey Briggs	Succeeded by William Whitmore; Humphrey Briggs
Baronetage of England
Preceded by Sir Walter Acton	Baronet (of Aldenham); 1665–1716	Succeeded by Sir Whitmore Acton
