= Listed buildings in Billingsley, Shropshire =

Billingsley is a civil parish in Shropshire, England. It contains four listed buildings that are recorded in the National Heritage List for England. Of these, one is listed at Grade II*, the middle of the three grades, and the others are at Grade II, the lowest grade. The parish is almost completely rural, and the listed buildings consist of two farmhouses, a farm building, and a church.

== Key ==
Grade	Criteria
II*	Particularly important buildings of more than special interest
II	Buildings of national importance and special interest

== Buildings ==
Name and location	Photograph	Date	Notes	Grade
St Mary's Church; 52.46565°N 2.43687°W	—	12th century	The church was considerably restored in 1875 in Decorated style. It is built in stone with freestone dressings, and tiled roofs. The church consists of a nave, a chancel, and a timber framed south porch. At the west end is a bellcote with a saddleback roof, iron cresting and a weathervane. There is a blocked Norman south doorway with a tympanum decorated with triangles, and with grotesque heads above.	II*
Southallbank Farmhouse; 52.45266°N 2.42833°W	—	17th century	The farmhouse was partly rebuilt in the 19th century. It is timber framed with red brick infill and red brick and has a tile roof. There are two storeys and an attic, and it consists of a main range with a cross-wing to the right, giving a front of three bays. The upper floor was jettied and has since been underbuilt, and the windows are casements.	II
Stable range, Southallbank Farm; 52.45266°N 2.42879°W	—	17th century	The stable range was later extended. The earliest part is timber framed on a stone plinth, and the later parts are in red brick. It is weatherboarded and has a tile roof. There is a single storey with a loft, an L-shaped plan with sides of seven and three bays, and there are five stable doors, loft doors and a window.	II
Church Farm House; 52.46523°N 2.43460°W	—	Early 19th century	A brick farmhouse with dentilled eaves and a tile roof. There are two storeys with an attic and three bays. On the front is a gabled porch with a round-headed entrance, and the windows are casements with segmental heads and lattice glazing.	II
