= Listed buildings in Morville, Shropshire =

Morville is a civil parish in Shropshire, England. It contains 19 listed buildings that are recorded in the National Heritage List for England. Of these, two are listed at Grade I, the highest of the three grades, one is at Grade II*, the middle grade, and the others are at Grade II, the lowest grade. The oldest listed building is a church that retains some surviving Norman features. Also listed are two country houses, together with associated structures. Otherwise the listed buildings include houses, cottages, farmhouses, farm buildings, a mill, and a signpost, the earliest of which are timber framed.

== Key ==
Grade	Criteria
I	Buildings of exceptional interest, sometimes considered to be internationally important
II*	Particularly important buildings of more than special interest
II	Buildings of national importance and special interest

== Buildings ==
Name and location	Photograph	Date	Notes	Grade
St Gregory's Church; 52.54192°N 2.48866°W		1118	The oldest parts of the church are the nave and the chancel, the aisles were added in the late 12th century, the tower came later, the chancel was remodelled in the early 16th century, the clerestory was added in 1856, and the east window dates from 1880. The church is built in sandstone, and consists of a nave with a clerestory, north and south aisles, a south porch, a long chancel, and a west tower. The tower has clasping buttresses and an embattled parapet. The remaining Norman items include the main doorway, the priest's door, two windows in the south aisle, and the chancel arch.	I
29 and 30 Morville; 52.54329°N 2.48774°W	—	Late 16th century (possible)	A pair of stone houses that have a tile roof with coped gables. There are two storeys and three bays. On the right is a massive chimney breast, and the windows are casements.	II
25 and 26 Morville; 52.54205°N 2.48526°W		17th century	A pair of houses that were refashioned in the 19th century, they are partly timber framed and partly in brick, and have a tile roof. There is one storey and an attic, two gables, each containing a dated cartouche, and the windows are mullioned casements.	II
Aldenham Mill; 52.55727°N 2.51694°W	—	17th century (probable)	The mill is partly timber framed and partly in brick. It has a tiled roof, and the openings are plain.	II
Haughton Croft; 52.55821°N 2.51612°W	—	17th century	The house, which was later altered, is partly timber framed and partly in brick, and has a tiled roof. There are two storeys and three bays, and the windows are casements.	II
Barn, Lye Mill; 52.53498°N 2.47890°W	—	17th century (probable)	The barn adjacent to the mill is timber framed with some weatherboarding. It is on a stone plinth, and has a tile roof.	II
Underton Cottage; 52.52403°N 2.46880°W	—	17th century	The cottage is timber framed with brick infill and a tile roof. There is one story and an attic, and an L-shaped plan, consisting of a main range and a gabled cross-wing to the right. The windows are casements, and there are two gabled dormers.	II
Upper Meadowley Farm House; 52.52952°N 2.49083°W	—	17th century	The farmhouse is timber framed and was refronted in brick in the early 19th century. It has a tile roof, there are two storeys, and the windows are casements. There is exposed timber framing at the rear.	II
West Underton Farm House; 52.52482°N 2.47064°W	—	17th century	The farmhouse was extended in the 18th century. The original part is timber framed, the extension is in brick painted to resemble timber framing, and the roofs are tiled. There are two storeys and an L-shaped plan.	II
Outbuildings, West Underton Farm; 52.52506°N 2.47105°W	—	Late 17th century (probable)	The outbuildings to the north of the farmhouse are partly timber framed and partly in brick, on a stone plinth. There are two ranges at right angles, forming an L-shaped plan. The north range has one storey and the west range has two.	II
Aldenham Park; 52.55516°N 2.48719°W		1691	A country house in Classical style, it was altered in the 19th century. It is built in grey sandstone with a parapet on the south and east fronts, gables and modillion cornices on the north and west fronts, and a hipped slate roof. There are two storeys, and a south front of eleven bays, the middle three bays projecting slightly under a raised parapet. The central doorway has Ionic columns, an entablature, and a triangular pediment with lions rampant on the slopes. The windows are of plate glass, those in the middle three bays having round heads and keystones, and the window above the doorway has an architrave.	II*
Barn, Haughton Farm; 52.55947°N 2.47399°W	—	17th or early 18th century	The barn is to the east of the farmhouse. It is partly timber framed and partly in brick, on a stone plinth, and has a tile roof. The barn has an L-shaped plan, and contains numerous ventilation holes.	II
Gateway, Aldenham Park; 52.54852°N 2.49162°W		Early 18th century	The gateway at the entrance to the drive contains elaborately decorated wrought iron gates flanked by tall rusticated stone piers. Each pier is surmounted by a rampant lion with an escutcheon.	II
Morville Hall; 52.54277°N 2.49042°W		c. 1748–49	A country house in Elizabethan style designed by William Baker, it was remodelled in the early 18th century. It is built in grey stone with a low parapet and a cornice, and slate roofs. The house has three storeys and a U-shaped plan, with a central block of four bays, and projecting wings of two bays. The central doorway has a pedimented porch with free-standing Doric columns, polygonal jambs, and quatrefoils in the soffits. There are polygonal stair turrets in the angles, and the windows are sashes. The house is flanked by quadrant walls that have rusticated pilaster strips with ball finials linking to pavilions. These have two storeys, four bays, parapets with ball finials, and domed octagonal turrets with wrought iron finials.	I
Stables, Aldenham Park; 52.55547°N 2.48827°W		1750–51	The stable block, designed by William Baker in Georgian style, has been converted for residential purposes. It is in red brick with stone dressings, a hipped roof. two storeys and seven bays, the middle bay wider and pedimented. In the middle bay is an arch with Tuscan pilasters containing the doorway, and outside the arch are oculi. In the centre of the roof is a cupola.	II
Signpost; 52.54386°N 2.48893°W	—	Early 19th century	The signpost at a road junction, is in red sandstone, and has a square plan. It has a chamfered shaft, a square head, and a pointed cap. In the head are rectangular recesses for the sign boards, which are now lost.	II
Chapel, Aldenham Park; 52.55538°N 2.48618°W	—	Early 19th century	Only the façade and the front part of the chapel have survived. It is in stone, the front is pedimented, and it contains four Ionic pilasters and a frieze with paterae. There are two casement windows, each with a semicircular recess containing the carving of a winged figure. Steps lead up to the doorway.	II
Evcall House; 52.54195°N 2.48601°W	—	Undated	A farmhouse that has been restored, it is timber framed with a tile roof. There are two storeys, the windows are three-light mullioned casements, and there is a later gabled porch.	II
Walls and gate piers, Morville Hall; 52.54372°N 2.48886°W		Undated	The gate piers flank the entrance to the drive. They are in ashlar stone and have ball finials. The walls are in rubble stone, they extend from the entrance towards the west, and also flank the west side of the drive.	II
