= John Weld (merchant) =

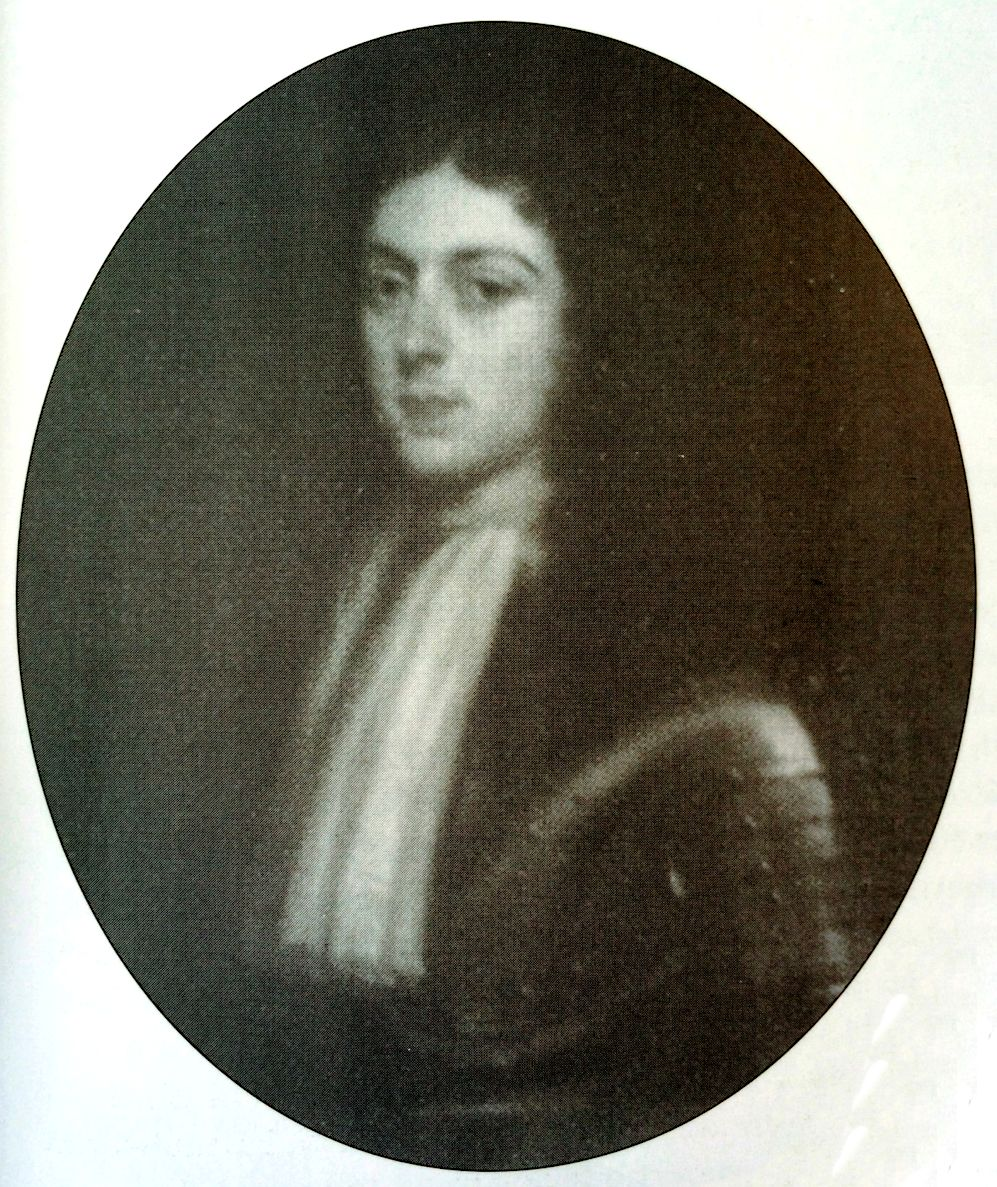
Sir John Weld

Sir John Weld (1582 – 1623) was a wealthy landowner and London merchant, the son of a Lord Mayor of London and the father of the branch of the Weld family which became settled at Lulworth Castle in Dorset. He was a charter member and Council assistant of the Newfoundland Company of 1610.

== Early life ==
John was the son of Sir Humphrey Weld, citizen and Grocer, who derived from Eaton, Cheshire, and his first wife, Ann Wheler. His mother dying, his father remarried to Mary, eldest daughter of Sir Stephen Slaney (Lord Mayor in 1595-96) and relict of Richard Bradgate (died 1589), both citizens and Skinners, who so became his stepmother. John had two surviving sisters, Joan (1580-1618), who in 1597 became the first wife of Sir Robert Brooke of Cockfield Hall, Yoxford, Suffolk, and Anne, who, after the death of her first husband Richard Corbett Esquire (of the Shropshire family), married secondly Sir James Stonehouse c. 1618.

John's father joined the City Aldermanry in 1598, in which year John matriculated a fellow-commoner from Trinity College, Cambridge. Sir Humphrey served as Sheriff of London in 1599-1600, and became Lord Mayor for 1608-09, when he received his knighthood. On 1 May 1610 Sir Humphrey made his will, making the customary division of his estate into three parts, one of which went entirely to his son John because his two sisters had already been advanced. His will particularly mentions both John Weld his son, and John Weld Esquire his nephew (1582-1666, son of Humphrey's brother John Weld (died 1588), citizen and Haberdasher) whom he named jointly among trustees to manage a fund to benefit the children of his brothers and sisters. In January 1607/08 he had already bound his son John into a tripartite indenture to ensure that Dame Mary should retain possession of his great mansion house in St Olave, Old Jewry and other properties in St Mary Colechurch during her widowhood. Sir Humphrey died in 1610.

== Career ==
John's inheritance opened the way for his investment and enterprise. In 1610 he bought the manor of Arnolds in Edmonton, Middlesex, the estate which gave its name to Arnos Grove and on which Arnos Grove house was later built. In that year both he (as John Weld, gent.) and his cousin John Weld Esq. were named among the 24 Assistants forming the Council of the Newfoundland Company, in King James's founding charter, together with their cousins John and Humphrey Slaney (nephews and associates of Sir Stephen, whose own sons predeceased him, and who died in 1608), merchants with wide-ranging interests operating out of the parish of St Martin Pomary. In 1601 Humphrey Slaney had married Joan Weld, sister of John Esq., and in 1610 John Slaney was appointed Treasurer (senior officer) of the London operation of the Newfoundland Company in the founding charter, working closely with the Proprietary Governors of the colony, John Guy and his successor Sir John Mason (governor).

On 24 May 1615 he founded the Weld Chapel as a private chapel to his mansion at Arnolds, in what is now Waterfall Road, Southgate. (It was replaced by Christ Church in 1862.) He was knighted by James I at Theobalds in 1617. In 1619 Sir John purchased the manor of Barnet from Anthony Butler, and it became part of the inheritance of his son and heir Humphrey. He made his will on 23 January 1622/23 being "sicke in bodye", asking "that my bodye be buryed within my late erected chappell neare unto my nowe Mansion howse called Arnoldes scytuated in the parish of Edmonton": he died on 6 February 1622/23 and the will was proved on 8 February immediately following. His stepmother Dame Mary Weld survived him by a few months. Dame Frances died in 1656.

== Personal life ==
John Weld married Frances Whitmore (sister of Sir William and Sir George Whitmore), and had four daughters and three surviving sons. Sir John's sons married into prominent Catholic families and became recusants. The children of Sir John Weld and Dame Frances (née Whitmore) are shown as follows by Burke:

- Thomas Weld, who died young
- Humphrey Weld, who married Hon. Clare Arundell (d. 1691), daughter of Thomas Arundell, 1st Baron Arundell of Wardour, in 1639. This Humphrey began the Weld line of the Lulworth Estate, Dorset.
- Sir John Weld (d. 1674), of Compton Bassett, who married Hon. Mary Stourton, daughter of William Stourton, 11th Baron Stourton, of Stourhead, in 1648, and had a son (William Weld, who succeeded to his uncle Humphrey).
- George Weld (d. 1696), who married Bridget Thimblethorp of Lincolnshire, and had daughters Cecilia (wife of Count Daniel O'Mahony) and Elizabeth.
- Anne Weld, who married Sir John Cutts of Childerley.
- Mary Weld, who married Thomas Allen, Esq. of Finchley.
- Frances Weld, who married Martin, Esq. of Buckinghamshire.
- Margaret Weld, who married William Bowyer, Esq. of Denham Court, Buckinghamshire, in 1634.
- Dorothy Weld.

=== John Weld of Willey ===
Sir John's cousin John Weld, Esquire (1582-1666), who served as Town Clerk of London 1613-1642, bought the manor of Willey, Shropshire, in 1617-1618 (where he was a neighbour of the Slaneys of Barrow and of the Whitmores of Apley), and was knighted in 1642. He married Elizabeth, eldest daughter of Sir William Romney (died 1611), Alderman of London, at St Martin Pomary on 4 February 1610/11. His sister Joan wife of Humphrey Slaney was buried there on 3 February 1630. His other sister Dorothy married Sir William Whitmore (died 1648) of Apley, Shropshire, brother of Sir George Whitmore (alderman and Lord Mayor of London) and of Frances Whitmore the wife of Sir John Weld of Edmonton. He was the father of Sir John Weld (died 1681) of Willey, also knighted 1642, who married Elizabeth, daughter of Sir George Whitmore.

== Memorial ==
A memorial inscription was set up for Sir John in the Weld Chapel, and was again re-set in the new church when the chapel was demolished. It included these verses:

"The wicked like a wasted candle sincke
Within the socket, and there, dye, and stincke:
But righteous men dissolvèd yield a s[c]ent
Like precious odours, when their box is rent,
And so did hee: at his departure giving
A lasting sweetnes, to refresh y^{e} living."

Heraldry

The memorial stone displayed the following arms quartered for Sir John:

- 1 and 4: (Weld). Azure, a fesse nebulée between three crescents ermine.
- 2: (Button als Grant). Azure, three lions rampant or, a chief argent.
- 3: (Fitzhugh). Argent, three chevrons sable each charged with a bezant: in fesse point a martlet for difference.
- Crest: A wyvern, wings expanded sable, guttée d'or, plain gorged and chained gold.

A slight variant of the Weld blazon, with a Label for cadency (eldest son), and motto: Nil sine numine, is attributed to Sir John on a stamped leather book-cover.

== The Weld alarm watch ==
An hour-striking alarm watch made in Aldgate by Isaac Simmes in 1600-1610, engraved with a quartering as above for Weld, and with representations of Isaac, Elijah, and the Priests of Baal, is in the collections of the British Museum, and is there attributed to Sir John Weld (1582-1623). In this blazon, however, there is a cadency mark of a crescent (second son) at the central crossing of the four quarters, and the fourth quarter is shown:

- 4: (Greswold). Argent, a fess gules between two greyhounds courant sable.

The Greswold heraldry indicates that this watch was engraved not for Humphrey's son, but probably for John Weld, Esq. (1581-1666), the son of Sir Humphrey's brother John Weld, (Haberdasher, died 1588, second son of John Weld of Eaton) and his wife Dorothy (daughter of Roger Griswold of Solihull, Warwickshire), who afterwards married Alderman Hugh Offley. Dorothy (died 1610) had a handsome small wall monument on the south side of the chancel of St Andrew Undershaft church.
