= Morville, Shropshire =

Village in Shropshire, England

Coordinates: 52.544035°N 2.4896714°W

Morville
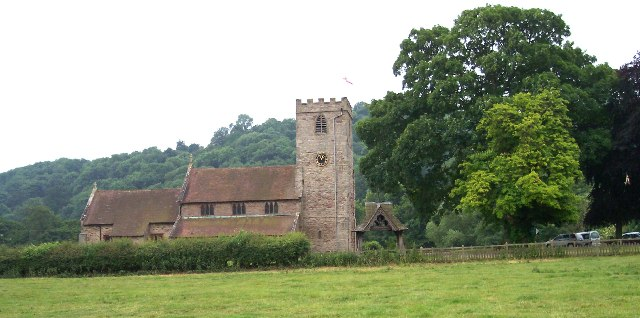

- Location within Shropshire
- Area: 16.0237 km^{2} (6.1868 sq mi)
- Population: 392 (2011 census)
  - Density: 24/km^{2} (62/sq mi)
- Civil parish: Morville
- Unitary authority: Shropshire
- Ceremonial county: Shropshire
- Region: West Midlands
- Country: England
- Sovereign state: United Kingdom
- Police: West Mercia
- Fire: Shropshire
- Ambulance: West Midlands
- Website: https://morville-pc.gov.uk/

Morville is a village and civil parish about 3 miles west of Bridgnorth, in the Shropshire district, in the county of Shropshire, England. In 2011, the parish had a population of 392. The parish touches Acton Round, Astley Abbotts, Aston Eyre, Barrow, Bridgnorth, Chetton, Tasley and Upton Cressett.

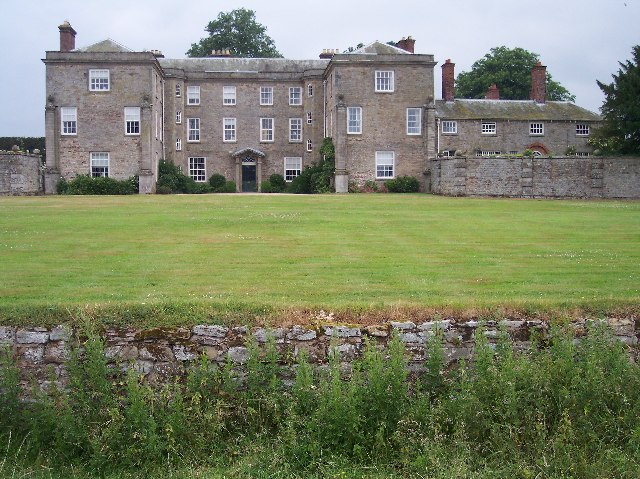
Morville Hall

== Landmarks ==
There are 20 listed buildings in Morville. Morville has a church called St Gregory the Great.

== History ==
The generic part of the name "Morville" means 'open land'. Morville was recorded in the Domesday Book as Membrefelde.

== See also ==
- Morville Priory
