= Whitmore baronets =

Baronetcy in the Baronetage of the United Kingdom

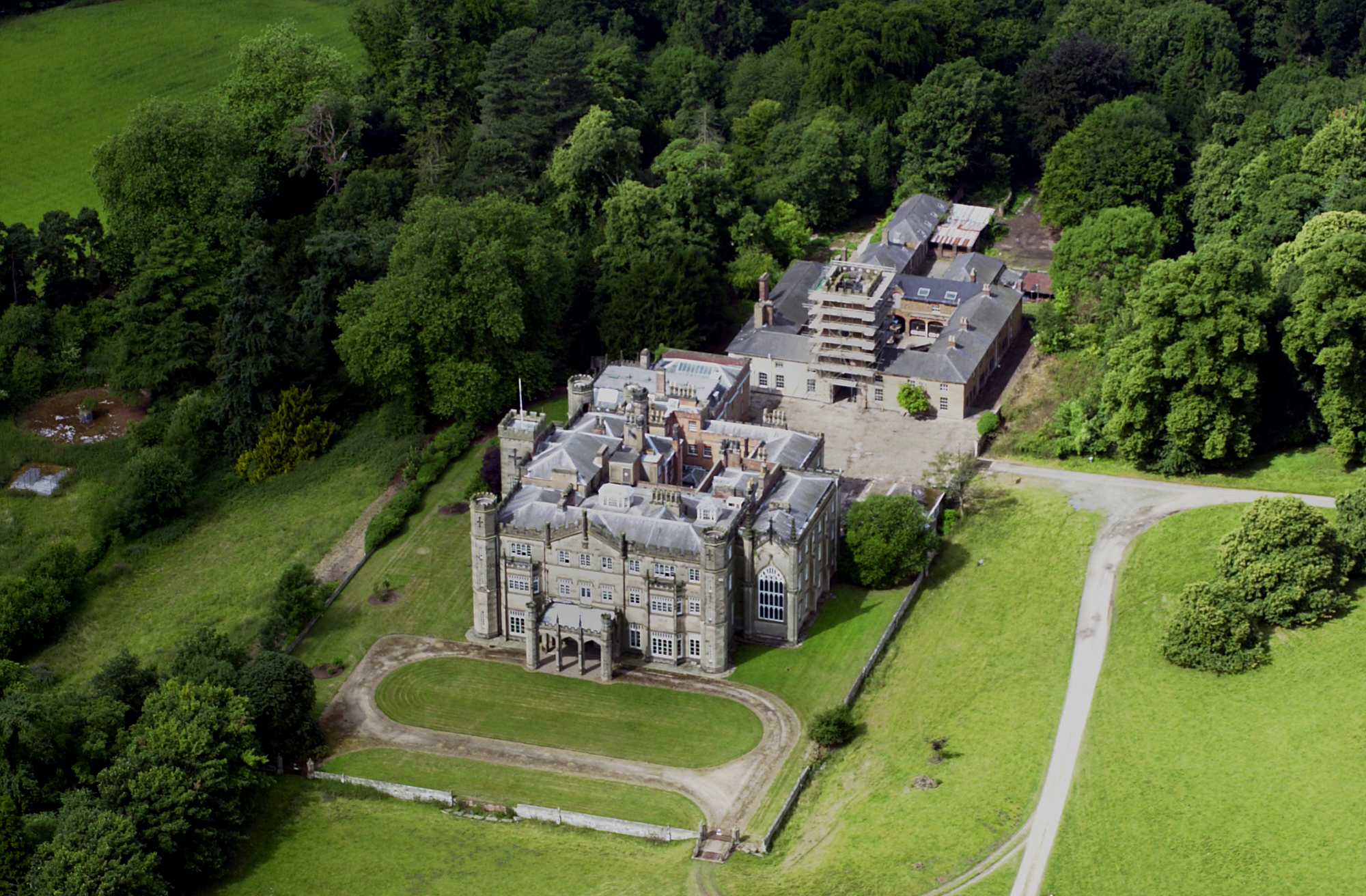
Apley Hall, the former seat of the Whitmore family

There have been two baronetcies created for members of the Whitmore family, one in the Baronetage of England and one in the Baronetage of the United Kingdom. One creation is extinct while the other is extant.

The Whitmore Baronetcy, of Apley in the County of Shropshire, was created in the Baronetage of England on 28 June 1641 for Thomas Whitmore, Member of Parliament for Bridgnorth. The second Baronet also represented this constituency in Parliament as well as Shropshire. The title became extinct on his death in 1699.

The Whitmore Baronetcy, of Orsett in the County of Essex, was created in the Baronetage of the United Kingdom on 28 June 1954 for Francis Whitmore, Lord Lieutenant of Essex from 1936 to 1958. Whitmore was a descendant of Richard Whitmore, brother of the first Baronet of the 1641 creation. He was succeeded in 1962 by his son John Whitmore, the second Baronet, who was a well-known management consultant and professional racing driver. The title passed to his only son, Jason, on Sir John's death in 2017.

The former seat of the Whitmore family was Apley Hall in Shropshire.

== Whitmore baronets, of Apley (1641) ==
Escutcheon of the Whitmore baronets of Apley

- Sir Thomas Whitmore, 1st Baronet (1612–1653)
- Sir William Whitmore, 2nd Baronet (1637–1699)

== Whitmore baronets, of Orsett (1954) ==
Escutcheon of the Whitmore baronets of Orsett

- Sir Francis Henry Douglas Charlton Whitmore, 1st Baronet (1872–1962)
- Sir John Henry Douglas Whitmore, 2nd Baronet (1937–2017)
- Sir Jason Whitmore, 3rd Baronet (born 1983)

There is no heir to the baronetcy.
