= Sir Thomas Whitmore, 1st Baronet =

English politician

Sir Thomas Whitmore, 1st Baronet (28 November 1612 – 1653) was an English politician who sat in the House of Commons of England between 1640 and 1644. He supported the Royalist side in the English Civil War.

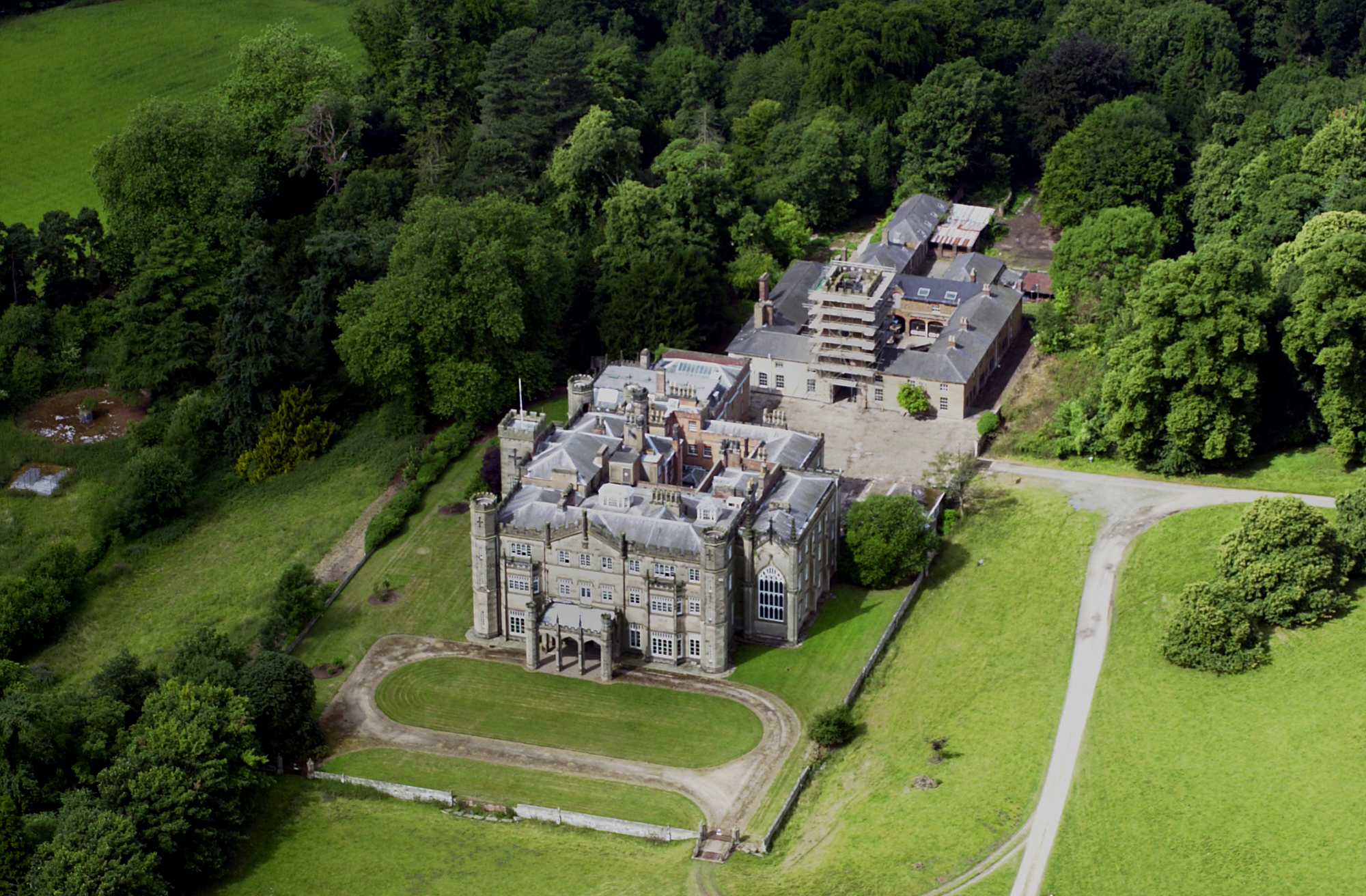
Apley Hall

== Biography ==
Whitmore was the son of Sir William Whitmore of Apley Hall, Shropshire, and his second wife Dorothy Weld, daughter of John Weld of London. His father was High Sheriff of Shropshire in 1620, and nephew of Sir George Whitmore (d.1654), Lord Mayor of London.

In April 1640, Whitmore was elected Member of Parliament for Bridgnorth for the Short Parliament. He was re-elected in November 1640 in the Long Parliament and held the seat until 1644 when he was disabled for supporting the King. He was created a baronet, of Apley, on 28 June 1641.

In February 1645, Whitmore's home Apley Hall was taken by the Parliamentarians under Sir John Price. Whitmore and his father, Sir Francis Ottley, Mr. Owen, and about sixty men, were captured. Their estates and moveable property were sequestered by the county's Sequestration Committee and they were held in confinement for a considerable time. Whitmore was fined the enormous sum of £5,000 by the compounders.

Whitmore died at the age of 41. He was succeeded in the baronetcy by his son William.

== Family ==
Whitmore married Elizabeth Acton, daughter of Sir William Acton, 1st Baronet. They had children:

- Sir William Whitmore, 2nd Baronet, who married Mary Harvey, and died without issue.
- Sir Thomas Whitmore, who married Hon. Frances Brooke, leaving issue.
- Anne Whitmore, who married Sir Francis Lawley, 2nd Baronet, of Canwell, Staffordshire, leaving issue.
- Elizabeth Whitmore, who married John Bennet, leaving issue.
- Dorothy Whitmore, who married Sir Eliab Harvey of Chigwell, leaving issue.

== Notes ==
Parliament of England
Parliament suspended since 1629	Member of Parliament for Bridgnorth; 1640; With: Sir Edward Acton, 1st Baronet	Succeeded by Robert Clive; Robert Charlton
Baronetage of England
New creation	Baronet (of Apley); 1641–1653	Succeeded by William Whitmore
