= Aldenham Park, Morville =

Country house in Morville, Shropshire, England

Coordinates: 52.555131°N 2.487037°W

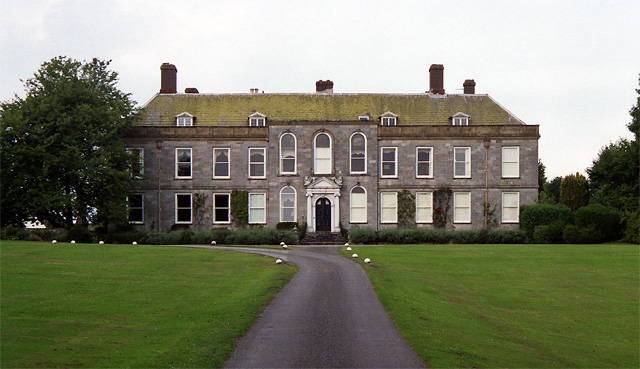
Aldenham Park

Aldenham Park, also known as Aldenham Hall, is a late 17th-century country house in Morville, near Bridgnorth, Shropshire, England which stands in 12 hectares of parkland. It is a Grade II* listed building.

The house is built of ashlar in two-storeys with an 11 bay frontage and a raised parapet. It is approached via a lime-lined avenue through a set of ornate gates surmounted by the Acton family crest. The surrounding parkland is Grade II listed.

== History ==
The manor of Morville was acquired in 1465 by Thomas Acton, who built a fortified manor house. That house was replaced in the early 17th century by his descendant Walter Acton. Walter's son, Sir Edward, was created a baronet in 1643 and was succeeded in turn by Sir Walter and Sir Edward. All three baronets served as MPs for Bridgnorth.

The third baronet married a wealthy heiress and in the late 17th century started to remodel the early 17th century house. The work was continued after Sir Edward's death in 1716 by his son, Sir Whitmore, who also made alterations to the park and gardens. The fifth baronet made little improvement to the estate other than building the stables around 1751. When he died without a direct heir in 1791, Aldenham passed to General Sir John Acton, a distant cousin who lived in Naples and was the Prime Minister of the Kingdom of the Two Sicilies. Sir John never visited Aldenham.

The General's grandson, Sir John Dalberg-Acton, was created Baron Acton in 1869. A noted politician and historian, Lord Acton built a substantial library circa 1865, which was demolished in the early 20th century. He was a professor of modern history at Cambridge University from 1895 and spent little time at Aldenham after 1878. He died in 1902 and was succeeded as second Baron by his son, Richard.

The family still occupied the house in the early 20th century, but subsequently it was let. In the mid 20th century it was occupied by the third Lord Acton's step-mother-in-law, Lady Rayleigh, and her son, the Hon. Guy Strutt.

During the Second World War, Monsignor Ronald Knox lived at Aldenham Hall while continuing to work on his translation of The Vulgate that was ultimately published as the Knox Bible.

In 1959 the estate was sold to Mr and Mrs Christopher Thompson, who undertook a major restoration project. The estate remains in private ownership and is used as a wedding and conference venue.

== See also ==
- Grade II* listed buildings in Shropshire Council (A–G)
- Listed buildings in Morville, Shropshire
