= William Romney =

English merchant

Sir William Romney
- Born: England
- Died: April 25, 1611
- Occupation(s): Merchant, haberdasher
- Known for: Governor of the East India Company
- Spouse: Rebecca Romney
- Children: Seven

Sir William Romney (died 25 April 1611) was an English merchant. He was governor of the East India Company and took part in other ventures to develop English interests in overseas trade.

== Early life ==
Romney, the only son of William Romney of Tetbury, Gloucestershire, and his wife Margaret, was a member of the Haberdashers' Company, and one of the original promoters of the East India Company.

== Career ==
For some time governor of the Merchant Adventurers' Company, he went to the Netherlands as one of the commissioners for that society in June 1598 to obtain a staple for their wool, cloth, and kerseys. On 22 September 1599 he subscribed £200 in the intended voyage to the East Indies, and on 24 September was made one of the treasurers for the voyage. An incorporator and one of the first directors of the East India Company, he was elected deputy-governor on 9 January 1601, and governor in 1606.

In November 1601 he urged the company to send an expedition to discover the Northwest Passage, either in conjunction with the Muscovy Company or alone. When the latter company consented to join in the enterprise (22 December 1601), he became treasurer for the voyage. He later joined in sending out Henry Hudson to discover a Northwest Passage in April 1610.

On 18 December 1602 Romney was elected alderman of Portsoken ward, and in 1603 one of the sheriffs of the City of London. On 26 July 1603, he was knighted at Whitehall.

After the end of the Anglo-Spanish War, there was an initiative to revive the Spanish Company; on 14 May 1604 he was elected as one of the company's assistants, and in August was one of those who attended the peace treaty negotiations with Spanish delegates. He sat on committees which established details of the trade.

Following the discovery of the Gunpowder Plot in November 1605, Romney was asked to make searches in London by the Lord Chief Justice for Lady Gray, who had been Robert Catesby's landlady.

When in 1607 the Colony of Virginia was established, Romney was appointed as one of the councillors who adjudged affairs concerning the colony. On 28 February 1610, he was a signatory to the appointment of the first Governor of Virginia, Thomas West, 3rd Baron De La Warr.

== Personal life ==
Romney married Rebecca, daughter of Robert Taylor, a haberdasher and alderman of the City of London; they had five sons and two daughters.

He died on 25 April 1611. By his will, dated 18 April 1611, he gave liberally to the hospitals, £20 to forty poor scholars in Cambridge, and £50 to the Haberdashers' Company to be lent to a young freeman gratis for two years.
