= Sir William Whitmore, 2nd Baronet =

English politician

Sir William Whitmore, 2nd Baronet (6 April 1637 – 30 March 1699) was an English politician who sat in the House of Commons from 1661 to 1699.

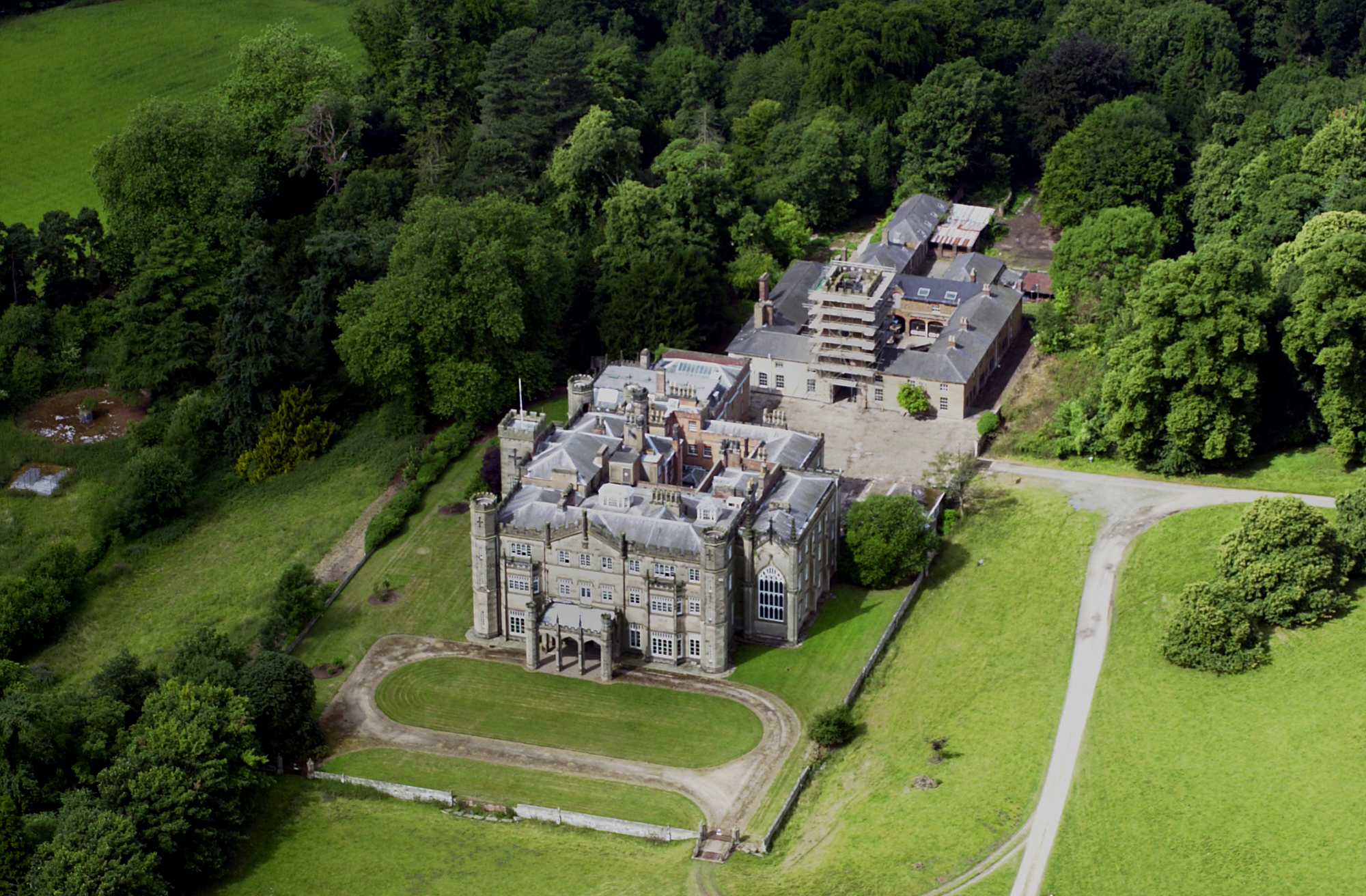
Apley Hall-seat of the Whitmore family.

Whitmore was the eldest son of Sir Thomas Whitmore, 1st Baronet of Apley Hall, Shropshire and his wife Elizabeth Acton, daughter of Sir William Acton, 1st Baronet (1570-1651). He was admitted to the Middle Temple in December 1652 with his younger brother Thomas.

He succeeded in 1653 to the baronetcy on the death of his father, who had been MP for Bridgnorth.

In 1660, Whitmore was elected Member of Parliament for the county of Shropshire and then for the borough of Bridgnorth from the Cavalier Parliament called in 1661, until his death in 1699. He was a largely inactive MP

Sir William held a number of local administrative posts, but his failure to support the succession of James II of England led to his removal.

In 1658 Sir William married Mary, daughter of Eliab Harvey of London. He died aged 61 without issue and the baronetcy became extinct. Apley Hall passed to his cousin William, the elder son of his uncle Richard Whitmore of Lower Slaughter, Gloucestershire.

Baronetage of England
Preceded by Thomas Whitmore	Baronet (of Apley); 1653–1699	Extinct
