= Whitmore Acton =

British politician

Sir Whitmore Acton, 4th Baronet (c. 1677 – 17 January 1731/32) was a British Member of Parliament.

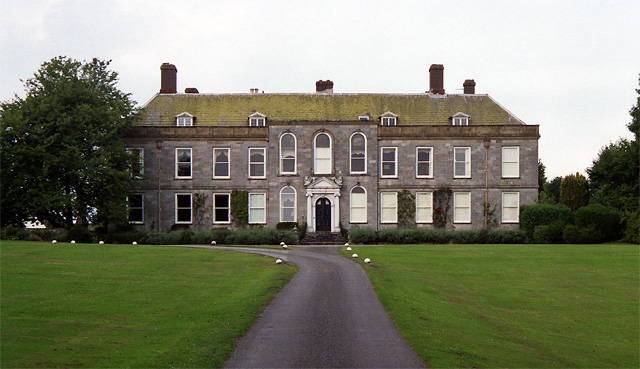
Aldenham Park

He was the eldest son of Sir Edward Acton, 3rd Baronet and educated at St Edmund Hall, Oxford and the Middle Temple. He succeeded to the baronetcy upon the death of his father in 1716.

Acton lived at Aldenham Park, near Bridgnorth and held the office of High Sheriff of Shropshire for 1727–28.

== Personal life ==
He married Elizabeth Gibbon, daughter of Matthew Gibbon of Putney, Surrey, a relation of the famous historian Edward Gibbon, and had the following children:

- Sir Richard Acton, 5th Baronet (1 January 1712 – 20 November 1791)
- Elizabeth Acton (b. bef. 1730)
- Jane Acton (b. bef. 1732)
- Mary Acton (b. bef. 1732)

== Sources ==
- Leigh Rayment's list of baronets
- Leigh Rayment's Historical List of MPs

Parliament of Great Britain
Preceded by Sir Humphrey Briggs; William Whitmore	Member of Parliament for Bridgnorth; 1710–1713; With: Richard Cresswell	Succeeded by William Whitmore; John Weaver
Baronetage of England
Preceded by Sir Edward Acton	Baronet (of Aldenham); 1716–1731/32	Succeeded by Sir Richard Acton
