= Billingsley, Shropshire =

Village in Shropshire, England

Coordinates: 52.456°N 2.423°W

Billingsley
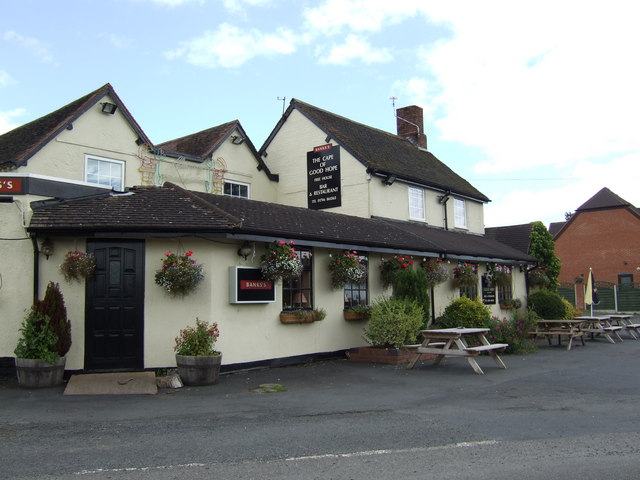
- The Cape of Good Hope public house, Billingsley

- Location within Shropshire
- Population: 208 (2011)
- OS grid reference: SO712843
- Civil parish: Billingsley
- Unitary authority: Shropshire
- Ceremonial county: Shropshire
- Region: West Midlands
- Country: England
- Sovereign state: United Kingdom
- Post town: BRIDGNORTH
- Postcode district: WV16
- Dialling code: 01746
- Police: West Mercia
- Fire: Shropshire
- Ambulance: West Midlands
- UK Parliament: Ludlow
- Website: https://billingsley-pc.gov.uk

Billingsley is a small village and civil parish in Shropshire, England. It is located 6 miles (9.7 km) south of Bridgnorth and lies in the diocese of Hereford.

The village is situated on the B4363 road, south of Deuxhill. Between the two parishes flows the Horsford Brook. The village itself is in an area covering approximately 1302 acres. The eastern boundary of the village is formed by the Borle Brook. The parish is directly above coal measures that belong to the Wyre Forest Coalfield.

== History ==
The name 'Billingsley' is a Saxon name and is said to mean 'the clearing of the sword'. It is argued that it was called this due to the shape of a wood clearing by Saxons who first settled there in the 7th century. Billingsley is not named in the Domesday Book because it was actually a detached portion of the Manor of Morville. It was granted to the Abbey of Shrewsbury by Earl Roger de Montgomery. Then in 1147, it passed hands from Shrewsbury Abbey to the Abbey of Seez in Normandy. After this it passed to the de Beysin family, Morehall family, the Clopton family and the Harewell family. Billingsley was predominately an agricultural village whose inhabitants led a fairly relaxed rural life. However, there is evidence to show of iron working.

In the 17th century, the woods were being occupied for the making of charcoal. In the 18th century, coal and ironstone were being mined. In the mid-1790s, Billingsley was exchanged hands to Sir William Pulteney who was the MP for Shrewsbury. He owned many estates throughout the country and was particularly interested in exploiting the mineral reserves that lay in Billingsley. The colliery struggled and in 1802, MacNab (one of Pulterney's associates) fled the country for fear of his creditors. Then in 1811, Billingsley's industrial period ended with the bankruptcy of George Stokes.

A brick works opened in Billingsley in the late 1860s and this continued until the First World War. There were further prospects for coal and as a result, some housing was built for the miners. However, most of the miners were housed in Highley. This was the beginning of the Billingsley Colliery Company but this also suffered from ill-success and closed in 1921.

== St. Mary’s Church ==
The church is located on the B4363 which runs through the village, about 2.5 km North West of Billingsley village. Billingsley Church was originally built in around 1140 and is classed as a Grade II listed building. The Churchyard alone is the home to two incredibly old yew trees. Both are mentioned in the National Register of Ancient Yews and are also mentioned in Andrew Morton's 'Trees of Shropshire'. According to the Church of England, Billingsley Church has an 'unusual' Jacobean double pulpit from around 1620. However the front of the Church contains mainly original Norman stonework. The Easter Sepulchre dates from around 1320. The registers of the parish date back to 1627. The Church was rebuilt in 1875 after a fire and at the time cost around £1000 for the renovation work to be carried out. Billingsley Church, as it currently stands, is dedicated to St. Mary and is made up of a south porch, chancel, nave and a bell tower containing two bells. The church contains both a memorial tablet to and a battlefield cross from the grave in France of Lieutenant H.W. Gibbs who was fatally wounded during World War I in 1918.

== Occupations ==
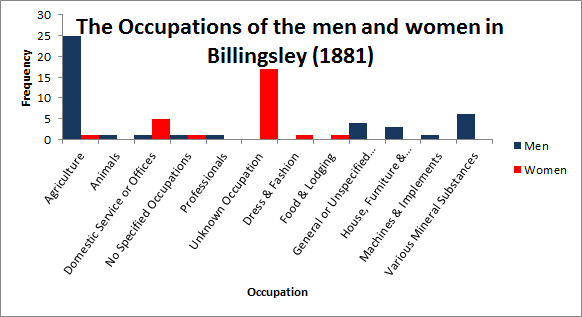
Occupations of men and women in Billingsley (1881).

This is a chart showing the occupational structure of the parish of Billingsley in 1881 – comparing men and women. It gives a valuable insight into the village at this time. It uses the '24 orders' that were used for the original published reports in 1881 plus an 'unknown' category. From the chart, it can be seen that the majority of men worked in agriculture which suggests that it was a predominantly agricultural and working class village. From the graph it can be seen that there are more men working than women. However, there are more women than men working in domestic services or offices.
Below is a pie chart showing the percentage of males aged 20 and over in 9 occupational categories in the village of Billingsley in 1831. Agriculture stands out again as the major occupation in the parish, with over half of the males in the village aged 20 and over taking up this occupation.

== Population ==
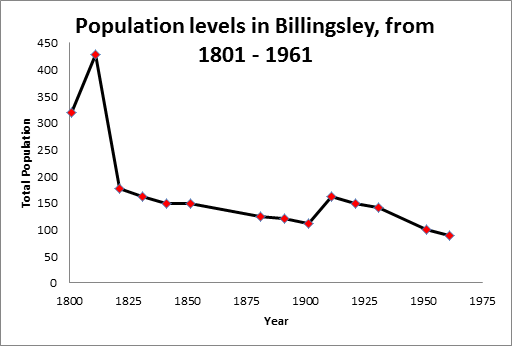
The Population of Billingsley from 1801 – 1961

According to the 2001 census Billingsley has a population of 181. This consists of 69 households, containing 86 females and 95 males. In 1801, the population was around 320 and rose to just over 425 by 1811. The population then decreased rapidly between 1811 and 1821 to just below 180 people. The population slowly decreased again to just over 100 by 1901. It then increased to just below 180 again but then began to decrease slowly again until 1961 when it was just below 90 people.

== Housing ==
The chart below shows the total number of houses in the village of Billingsley from 1830 to 1960. In 1831 there were 32 houses in the village. This gradually decreased until 1841 to 29 houses. This rose again over the next 10 years and then started to decrease again until 1901 when there were 21 houses. The number of houses increased yet again until 1931 to 32 (the same as 100 years earlier) and has been gently fluctuating around 30 since then. There was a small housing estate built in Billingsley in the 1960s however the village does still remain small and rural.

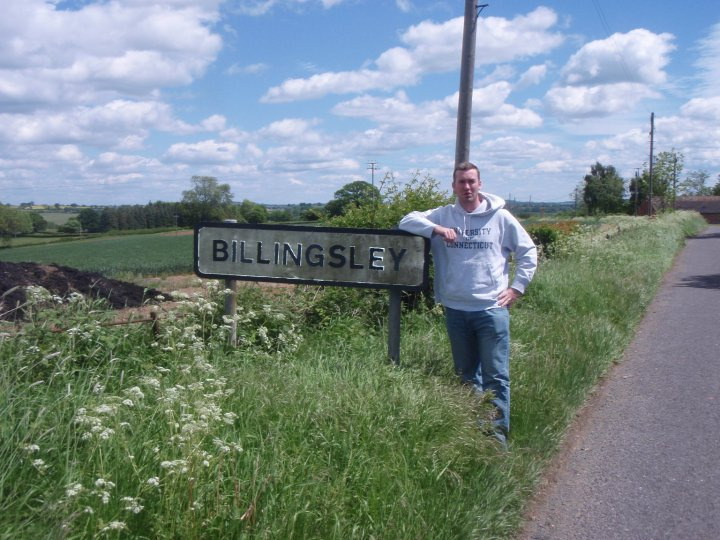
The sign when entering Billingsley, England

The Cape of Good Hope

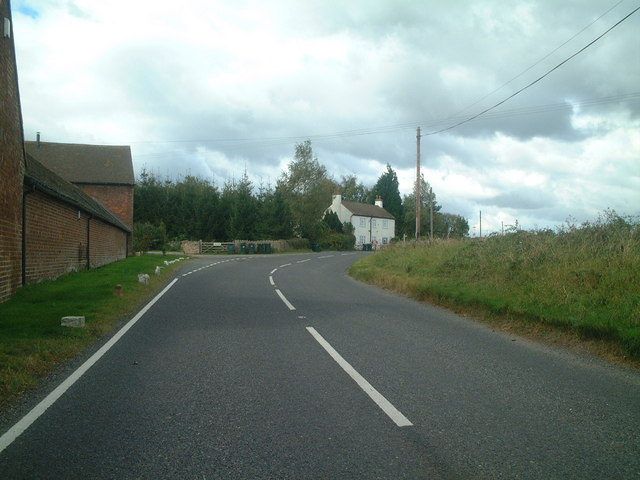
The Old Post Office, Billingsley

== Notable people ==
- Thomas Hyde (1636–1703), orientalist, was born at Billingsley, his father then rector of the parish.
- Christopher Gill (born 1936), Conservative MP for Ludlow 1987-2001 and later UK Independence Party politician, lived at Billingsley Hall Farm in 1988.
- Liam Treadwell (1986–2020), National Hunt jockey, died in the village.

== See also ==
- Listed buildings in Billingsley, Shropshire
