= Sir William Acton, 1st Baronet =

English merchant and Royalist

Sir William Acton, 1st Baronet (1570 – 22 January 1651) was an English merchant and Royalist who was Lord Mayor of London in 1640.

Acton was the son of Richard Acton, a London merchant, and Margaret Dannell. He was apprenticed by the Merchant Taylor Company in 1593 and freed in 1601. Acton supplied silk fabric to Anne of Denmark.

On 12 February 1628, he was elected an alderman of the City of London for Aldersgate ward. That same year, he was Sheriff of London. He was created a baronet on 30 May 1629.

In 1640, Acton was due to be elected Lord Mayor of London but in an unprecedented vote he was passed over because of his strong Royalist views. Edmund Wright was voted in as the compromise candidate.

Acton married firstly Anne Bill, daughter of James Bill of Ashwell, Hertfordshire, and secondly Jane Johnson Bird, widow of Sir William Bird. Acton's daughter and sole heiress, Elizabeth, brought great wealth to the Whitmore family upon her marriage to Sir Thomas Whitmore, 1st Baronet. The baronetcy became extinct on Acton's death.

Civic offices
Preceded by Henry Garraway	Lord Mayor of the City of London; 1640	Succeeded by Edmund Wright
Baronetage of England
New title	Baronet of the City of London; 1629–1651	Extinct
