= Acton Round =

Village in Shropshire, England

Coordinates: 52.556°N 2.537°W

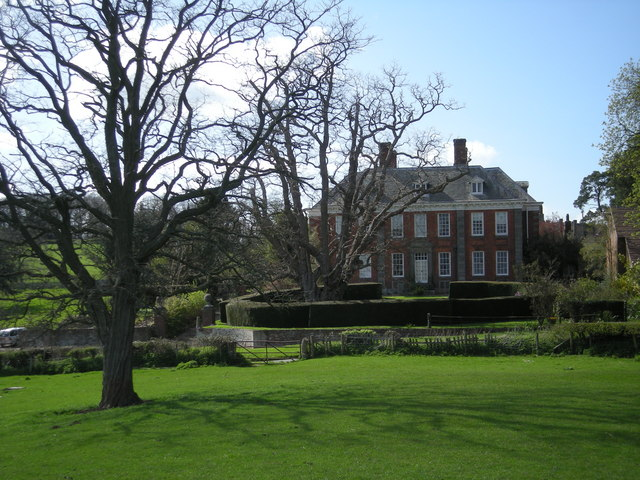
- Acton Round Hall

- Location within Shropshire
- OS grid reference: SO635955
- Civil parish: Acton Round
- Unitary authority: Shropshire
- Ceremonial county: Shropshire
- Region: West Midlands
- Country: England
- Sovereign state: United Kingdom
- Post town: BRIDGNORTH
- Postcode district: WV16
- Dialling code: 01746
- Police: West Mercia
- Fire: Shropshire
- Ambulance: West Midlands
- UK Parliament: Ludlow

Acton Round is a village and civil parish in the English country of Shropshire. Acton Round was recorded in the Domesday Book as Achetune. The civil parish includes the village of Muckley.

== See also ==
- Listed buildings in Acton Round
