= Morville Hall =

Historic house and gardens in Morville, Shropshire

Coordinates: 52.5429°N 2.4896°W

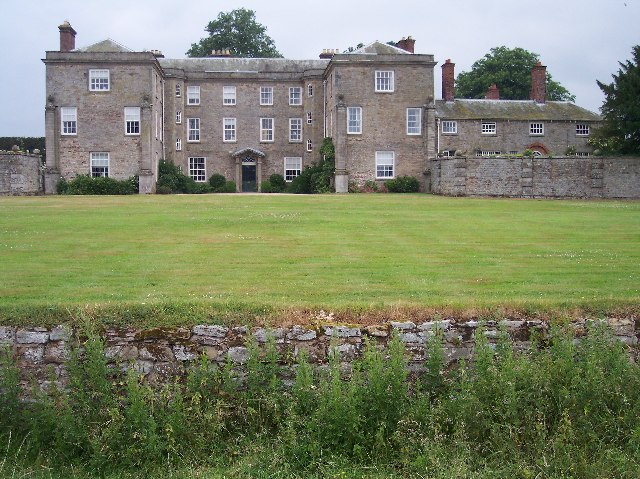
Morville Hall

Morville Hall is a grade I listed country house and gardens in the care of the National Trust in the county of Shropshire, England, United Kingdom.

Morville Hall is located at the junction of the A458 road and the B4368 road, three miles outside the market town of Bridgnorth.

It is a large grey stone mansion with projecting wings, originally built in two storeys in the 16th-century but increased to three as part of an 18th-century enlargement. Once part of the Aldenham estate, the house stands on the site of the abandoned Morville Priory.

Morville Hall was originally an Elizabethan country house dating from 1546, at the time the site was acquired by Roger Smyth, who married into the local Cressett family. It was enlarged and expanded around 1750 by Arthur Weaver, MP for Bridgnorth.

The gardens incorporate the Dower house Gardens and features such as a Cloister garden and an Elizabethan knot garden. The gardens project was a 15-year project for Katherine Swift who wanted to show how gardens have developed and evolved throughout history. Each section of her garden relates to a previous occupant of the Hall, from the Elizabethan Smyths through to the 18th century Weavers, and finally to the seven Victorian age Warren sisters who lived on in the house long after the death of their father, the last one, Juliana, dying in the 1920s.

== National Trust and closure to the public ==
The property has belonged to the National Trust since 1965. From 2017, it was leased to a private tenant who was forced to leave the lease early due to two major water tank leaks. The tenant documented the troubles on an Instagram account called The Tenants of Morville Hall, a play on the title of the Bronte novel, The Tenant of Wildfell Hall. The house and adjoining apartments have been empty for some time. The building remains closed and unused as of 2025. It has not been open to the public since the global pandemic of 2019. Two barn conversions on the Morville estate, also managed by the National Trust, are available to rent as accommodation.

== See also ==
- Grade I listed buildings in Shropshire
- Listed buildings in Morville, Shropshire
