= Acton baronets =

Title in the Baronetage of England

There have been two baronetcies created for persons with the surname Acton, both in the Baronetage of England. One creation is extant.

The Acton Baronetcy, of the City of London, was created in the Baronetage of England on 30 May 1629 for Sir William Acton, a merchant and King Charles I's choice of candidate for the position of Lord Mayor of London in 1640 (he was rejected in the Court of Common Hall election, which was unprecedented). He had no sons and the title became extinct on his death in 1651. His only daughter, Elizabeth, married Sir Thomas Whitmore, 1st Baronet.

The Acton Baronetcy, of Aldenham in the County of Shropshire, was created in the Baronetage of England on 17 January 1644 for Edward Acton, MP for Bridgnorth (first cousin once removed of Sir William Acton). For more information on this creation, see the Baron Acton.

== Acton baronets, of the City of London (1629) ==
Escutcheon of the Acton baronets of the City of London

- Sir William Acton, 1st Baronet (before 1593–1651)

== Acton baronets, of Aldenham (1644) ==
- see the Baron Acton

== Sources ==
- Leigh Rayment's list of baronets
