= George Whitmore (haberdasher) =

English merchant

- Portrait by Cornelius Johnson

Lord Mayor of London
- In office 1631–1632

Personal details
- Died: 12 December 1654
- Spouse: Mary Copcott
- Relations: William Whitmore (elder brother)
- Children: 7
- Parents: William Whitmore (father); Anne Bonde (mother)

Sir George Whitmore (died 12 December 1654) was an English merchant who was Lord Mayor of London in 1631. He supported the Royalist cause in the English Civil War.

== Biography ==
Whitmore was the third son of William Whitmore (d. 1593), citizen and Haberdasher of London, lessee of Balmes Manor in Hackney and owner of Apley Hall in Shropshire. His mother Anne (died 1615), a benefactor of the Haberdashers' Company, was the daughter of William Bonde, Haberdasher, Sheriff of London in 1567-68, and alderman of London from 1567 to 1576. William Bonde died in 1576. George was the younger brother of Sir William Whitmore of Apley, Shropshire, and they were brothers-in-law of Sir William Craven, Lord Mayor in 1611.

George Whitmore was a city of London merchant and a member of the Worshipful Company of Haberdashers. On 2 June 1621 he was elected an alderman of the City of London for Farringdon Within ward. He was Sheriff of London from 1621 to 1622 and Master of the Haberdashers Company for the first time in the same year: he transferred as alderman to the Langbourn ward in 1626.

In 1624 the theologian Thomas Gataker (1574-1654) published a volume Iacobs Thankfulnesse to God, for Gods Goodness to Iacob, dedicated jointly to Sir William and to Mr George Whitmore, opening his address by stating that their mother had presented him and spoken for him at baptism, as his godmother. He goes on to say that she continued to support him, making bequests to him in her will. His texts, which concern the promise that God will advance the temporal affairs of those who attend to the spiritual, are, he says, "to egge you on, whom God hath blessed with so large a portion of his bounty, unto those religious offices, that by occasion of Iacobs example, men of your rancke are therein encited unto, whether risen from meane estate, as with him here it had beene, or from the first largely and liberally endowed, as your selves". His texts are an expansion of a lecture formerly delivered to the Worshipful Company of Haberdashers when one of them, as Master of the Company, proposed his name to address them. He develops his theme to explore differences between their own theology and that of the Romanists.

In 1631, he was elected Lord Mayor of London. Thomas Heywood published an account of all the pageants and triumphs which attended his inauguration, and in his dedicatory letter wrote: "...of you it may be undeniably spoken: that none ever in your place was more sufficient or able, any cause whatsoever shall be brought before you, more truly to discerne; being apprehended more aduisedly to dispose, being digested, more maturely to despatch."

He was Master of the Haberdashers Company again from 1631 to 1632. He was knighted on 27 May 1632. From 1632 to 1642 he was president of Bethlem and Bridewell. He was a strong supporter of the King in the Civil War, and was imprisoned by the Parliamentarians as a 'delinquent'. In 1641, he received King Charles I at Balmes Manor, which had been purchased for him in 1634 by his elder brother Sir William Whitmore of Apley, High Sheriff of Shropshire in 1620.

== Family ==
Sir George Whitmore married Mary Copcott, daughter and heir of Reynold Copcott, step-daughter of Richard Daniel of Truro, and sister of Alexander Daniel whom she names in her will probated 1657. Their children were:

- William Whitmore, of Balmes, Hackney, married Frances.
- Charles Whitmore, inherited the manor of Ottringham, Yorkshire
- George Whitmore
- Elizabeth Whitmore, married Sir John Weld (died 1681) of Willey, Shropshire. Her daughter married Richard Whitmore, jnr, of Lower Slaughter.
- Anne Whitmore, married Sir John Robinson, Lord Mayor of London in 1662.
- Margaret Whitmore, married Sir Charles Kemeys, 2nd Baronet, of Cefn Mably.
- Mary Whitmore, baptized 1615

Civic offices
Preceded by Sir Robert Ducie, 1st Baronet	Lord Mayor of the City of London; 1631	Succeeded by Nicholas Rainton
