= John Weld (politician) =

English politician

Sir John Weld (1613–1681), of Chelmarsh and Willey, Shropshire was an English politician who sat in the House of Commons in 1679.

Weld was the only son of Sir John Weld of St Clements Lane, London and Willey, Shropshire, by his wife Elizabeth Romney, daughter of Sir William Romney, Haberdasher, of Ironmonger Lane, London. He matriculated at Trinity College, Oxford on 29 January 1630, aged 17, and was awarded BA on 10 May 1631. He was also admitted at Middle Temple in 1630. By 1633, he married Elizabeth Whitmore, daughter of Sir George Whitmore of Balmes, Hackney (Lord Mayor of London) in 1631. He was knighted on 22 September 1642.

Weld's son George was Member of Parliament for Much Wenlock but in March 1679, Weld put himself up there instead, and was returned as MP. He was inactive in Parliament and was defeated at the election in August 1679.

Weld was buried at Willey on 4 August 1681. He had seven sons and five daughters, of whom Anne married Richard Whitmore, jnr., of Lower Slaughter, Gloucestershire and Apley, Shropshire.

Parliament of England
| Preceded by Sir Thomas Littleton, Bt; George Weld | Member of Parliament for Much Wenlock; 1679; With: William Forester | Succeeded by John Wolryche; William Forester |
