= William Martin (Royal Navy officer) =

Royal Navy admiral (1696–1756)

Admiral William Martin
- Born: c. 1696
- Died: 17 September 1756 (aged 59–60); Twickenham
- Spouse: Mary Atkins (m. 1726)
- Military career
- Allegiance: Great Britain
- Branch: Royal Navy
- Service years: 1708–1756
- Rank: Admiral
- Commands: HMS Cumberland; HMS Seahorse; HMS Blandford; HMS Advice; HMS Grafton; HMS Sunderland; HMS Ipswich
- Conflicts: War of the Spanish Succession; Queen Anne's War; War of the Austrian Succession

Admiral William Martin (c. 1696 – 17 September 1756) was an officer of the Royal Navy who saw service during the War of the Spanish Succession and the War of the Austrian Succession.

Martin rose from obscure origins to see service during the War of the Spanish Succession. He was promoted to command several ships, seeing service in home waters and in the Mediterranean during the years of peace, and shortly after the outbreak of the War of the Austrian Succession, was rewarded for his good service with a posting as commodore, and command of a squadron. He served under several of the Mediterranean Fleet's commanders, Nicholas Haddock, Richard Lestock, and most significantly Thomas Mathews. Mathews was engaged in promoting British interests in the Mediterranean during the war, and policing the neutrality of the Mediterranean kingdoms, trying to prevent them joining the war in support of Britain's enemies. Several times Martin was sent with squadrons to rival nation's ports, to threaten them with naval retaliation if they did not comply with British demands, and was uniformly successful in convincing local rulers not to resist.

Promoted to flag rank during the war, Martin served in a junior role in commanding the principal fleets, mainly in British waters, but also on an expedition to Lisbon. Rising steadily through the ranks, and taking command in his own right eventually, he eventually retired ashore towards the conclusion of the war, and died in 1756 with the rank of admiral of the blue.

== Family and early life ==
Little is known about Martin's early life. He may have been the eldest son of Tutchen Martin, resident of Stepney, and his wife Bennet Gash, or Gage. Other accounts suggest that he was the son of Commodore George Martin, who died in 1724. William Martin appears to have entered the navy, as a volunteer-per-order, on 26 August 1708, joining HMS Dragon. Dragon went out to Newfoundland in May 1710, but Martin did not accompany her, having been left at Plymouth on account of his health. Instead he went out to the Mediterranean aboard HMS Ranelagh and was promoted to second lieutenant of HMS Resolution on 30 July 1710 by Sir John Norris. Martin remained in the Mediterranean for the next few years, being transferred to HMS Superb on 4 January 1712 by Sir John Jennings and serving aboard her until July 1714.

Martin then went out with the fleet despatched to the Baltic under Sir John Norris, and served at first aboard Norris's flagship HMS Cumberland, but transferring at some point between 1715 and 1718 to HMS Rupert, before returning to Cumberland. He was promoted to captain of Cumberland on 9 October 1718, remaining with her until 9 February 1720, when he took command of HMS Blandford, still with Norris's fleet in the Baltic between 1720 and 1721. He afterwards went to American waters to combat piracy.

== Command and Mediterranean ==
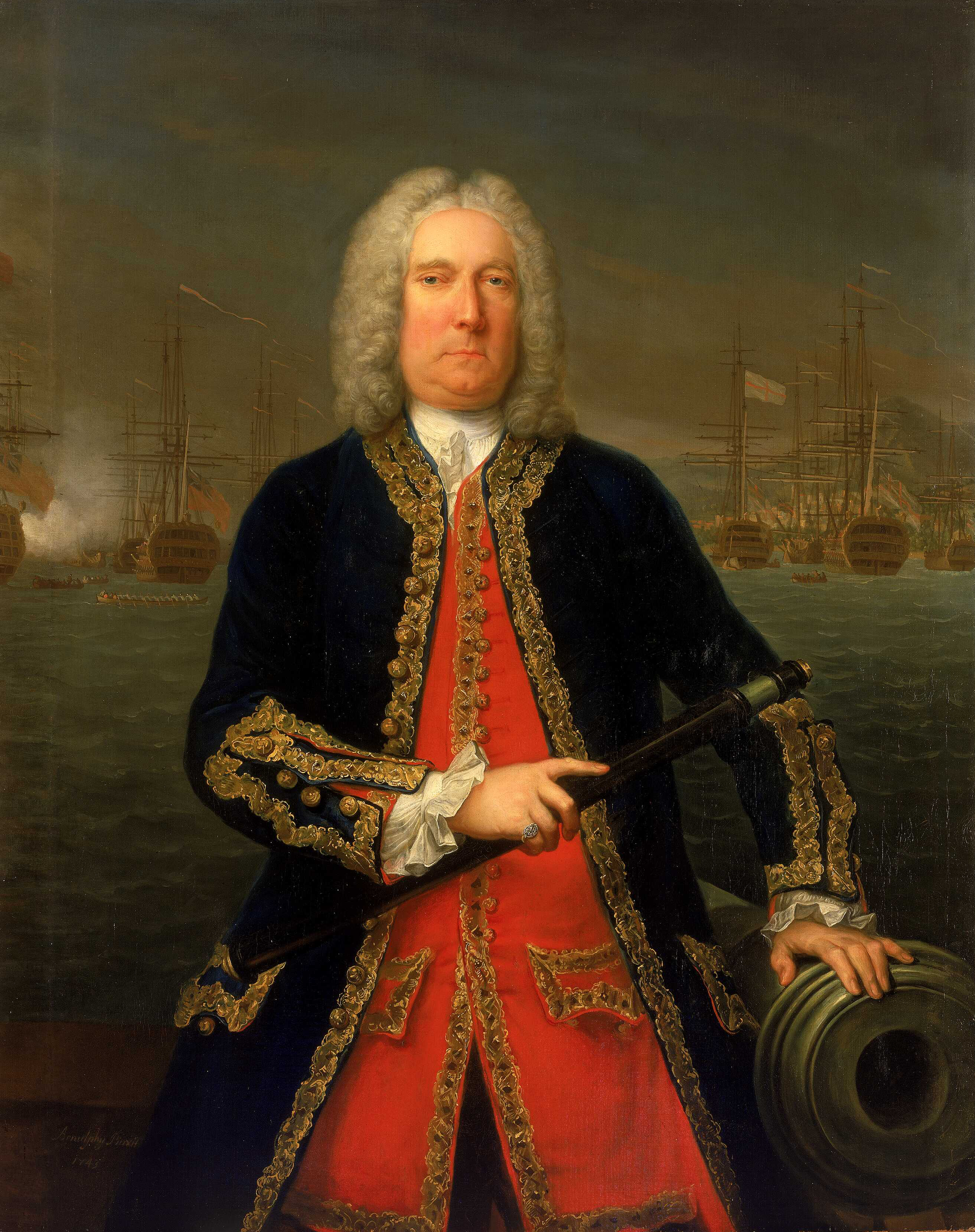
Admiral Thomas Mathews, who was Martin's commander in the Mediterranean and sent him on a number of detached missions to Mediterranean ports to convince their rulers not to support Britain's enemies.

Martin took command of HMS Advice in 1727, and was assigned at first to the fleet supporting Gibraltar, and then to service in the English Channel with Sir Charles Wager's fleet. He left Advice in 1732 and took command of HMS Sunderland the following year. His command of Sunderland lasted until 1737, and took him to Lisbon and into the Mediterranean. His service in these waters continued after his transfer to HMS Ipswich in May 1738, with Ipswich assigned to Rear-Admiral Nicholas Haddock's fleet. Martin's service continued after the outbreak of the War of the Austrian Succession, and he was appointed commodore in January 1741 and given a detached squadron off Cádiz. Haddock returned to England at about this time, handing over command in the Mediterranean to his second officer, Richard Lestock, who was in turn superseded by the arrival of Vice-Admiral Thomas Mathews. Mathews had the task of carrying out diplomatic missions with the Mediterranean states and of securing British interests during the war. The Neapolitans had, in violation of their claims of neutrality, sent troops to support Britain's enemy, Spain, and Mathews was determined to force their withdrawal from the war. In July 1742 Mathews sent Martin, in command of squadron, to Naples 'to bring the King of the two Sicilies to a just sense of his errors in having attacked in conjunction with the Spaniards the Queen of Hungary's territories in Italy.'^{[a]}

=== Mission to Naples ===
Martin arrived at Naples on the afternoon of 19 August, with orders to capture, sink or burn any vessels carrying military stores and supplies he found there and 'to use his utmost to lay the said city in ashes, unless the King of the two Sicilies shall agree forthwith not only to withdraw his troops now acting in conjunction with those of the King of Spain in Italy, but to forbear from giving in future any assistance of what kind soever.' Martin sent his flag captain, Merrick de L'Angle, onshore to present the terms to the King, demanding that an answer be returned within half an hour. The small squadron was considerably more powerful than anything the Neapolitans could muster, and after calling an emergency council, the King and his ministers attempted to make conditions, sending a deputy back to Martin with de L'Angle. Martin instead stated that he was sent 'as an officer to act, not a minister to treat', and once more demanded the King comply with the demands. With no way of resisting, the Neapolitans confirmed their neutrality, and promised to withdraw their troops. His objective achieved, Martin weighed anchor at midnight, and sailed to rejoin Mathews at Hyères Bay.

=== Actions against the Genoese ===
Martin's next task involved cruising to protect Tuscany from Spanish attacks, and in February 1743 he went to the Genoese town of Ajaccio, with orders to destroy some Spanish magazines there. On arrival Martin again threatened to destroy the town with a naval bombardment, unless the inhabitants agreed to demolish the magazines, which they did. Despite this, the Genoese continued to provide assistance to the Spanish, and news reached Mathews early in 1743 that a Spanish ship had collected levies from Corsica and sailed them to Italy, anchoring at Ajaccio. Mathews despatched Martin on 13 February in Ipswich, and accompanied by HMS Revenge and HMS Anne Galley to Ajaccio. Martin anchored off the port on 18 February, with his quarry, the San Isidro, anchored inside, hauled in close to the shore batteries. Martin weighed anchor at 4 am the next morning and warped into the harbour, laying Ipswich alongside the Spanish vessel, while Revenge did the same. The ships exchanged a heavy fire until the San Isidro caught fire and blew up at noon. Martin then returned to Mathews at Hyères.

== Flag rank ==
After these successes Martin sailed back to England, arriving there late in 1743, and receiving a promotion to rear admiral on 7 December. He received a command in the Channel Fleet in February 1744 under his old commander, Sir John Norris, and was promoted to vice admiral on 23 June 1744. Martin was appointed second in command of the fleet sent to Lisbon under Sir John Balchen, and while there produced a report on the contract hospitals. Martin was highly critical of them, and influenced the later decision to introduce dedicated medical centres solely for naval use. Balchen was lost during the return voyage to England, when his flagship, the 100-gun HMS Victory, disappeared at sea. Martin replaced him as commander of the fleet, a post he held until 1745.

== Fleet commands and later life ==
Martin was based in the Downs under Admiral Edward Vernon in December 1745, and then succeeded Vernon in the command. The fleet had been stationed off the Downs to meet the threat of a French invasion to support a Jacobite rising. One such fleet had already been dispersed the previous year, and with the collapse of the threat Martin returned to his usual station, and commanded the main fleet until his retirement in July 1746 on health grounds. He was promoted to full admiral on 15 July 1747, and retired to Twickenham where he died on 17 September 1756. He had married Mary Atkins, of Twell, Gloucestershire on 16 August 1726, but the couple did not have any children.

== Notes ==
a. The squadron consisted of Martin's 70-gun Ipswich, the 50-gun HMS Panther, Captain Solomon Gideon; the 50-gun HMS Oxford, Captain Harry Powlett; the 40-gun HMS Faversham, Captain Richard Hughes; the 20-gun HMS Dursley Galley, Captain Merrick de L’Angle; and the 8-gun bomb vessels HMS Carcass, Captain J. Bowdler; HMS Salamander, Captain J. Philipson; and HMS Terrible, Captain the Hon. George Edgcumbe. Also listed in some sources as forming the squadron are a xebec named Guarland's Prize, and the bomb vessel HMS Firedrake.
