= Sir Richard Hughes, 1st Baronet =

British naval officer (1708–1779)

Captain Sir Richard Hughes Bt
- Born: 1708; Deptford, England
- Died: 23 September 1779 (aged 71); Southampton, England
- Children: Sir Richard Hughes, 2nd Baronet
- Military career
- Allegiance: Kingdom of Great Britain
- Branch: Royal Navy
- Service years: 1721–1773
- Rank: Captain
- Commands: HMS Anne Galley; HMS Dursley Galley; Commander-in-Chief, Portsmouth; HMS Faversham; HMS Chatham; HMS Essex; HMS Fougueux; Resident Commissioner, Portsmouth Dockyard
- Conflicts: War of the Austrian Succession; Seven Years' War

Captain Sir Richard Hughes, 1st Baronet (1708 – 23 September 1779), was a Royal Navy officer of the eighteenth century who served as Resident Commissioner of Portsmouth Dockyard. Hughes joined the navy in 1721 and served on a variety of ships, some commanded by his father Captain Richard Hughes, mostly in the Mediterranean Sea and Baltic Sea, and was also a some-time follower of Admiral Sir John Norris. He was promoted to commander in 1739 and given command of HMS Anne Galley, and was promoted to post-captain in the following year. Having served mostly in command of ships in the Mediterranean Fleet, Hughes was given command of the guardship HMS Fougueux in 1753, from where he was appointed Resident Commissioner of Portsmouth in 1754. He served there until 1773, in which year he was created a baronet and then retired. He died at Southampton, aged 71.

== Naval career ==
=== Early life ===
Richard Hughes was born in 1708, the son of Captain Richard Hughes, who was Resident Commissioner, Portsmouth Dockyard, and Governor of the Royal Naval Academy, and his wife Mary Loader, at Deptford. The Hughes family were descended from the Princes of Cardigan in the Kingdom of Gwent, and had changed the family surname from Ap Hughes to Hughes in the 1600s. He had one brother, Robert, who would become a rear-admiral in the Royal Navy. Hughes also joined the navy, becoming a volunteer on board the 60-gun fourth-rate HMS Nottingham on 26 August 1721. Nottingham was commanded by his father, and served in the Baltic Fleet of Admiral Sir John Norris.

=== First services ===
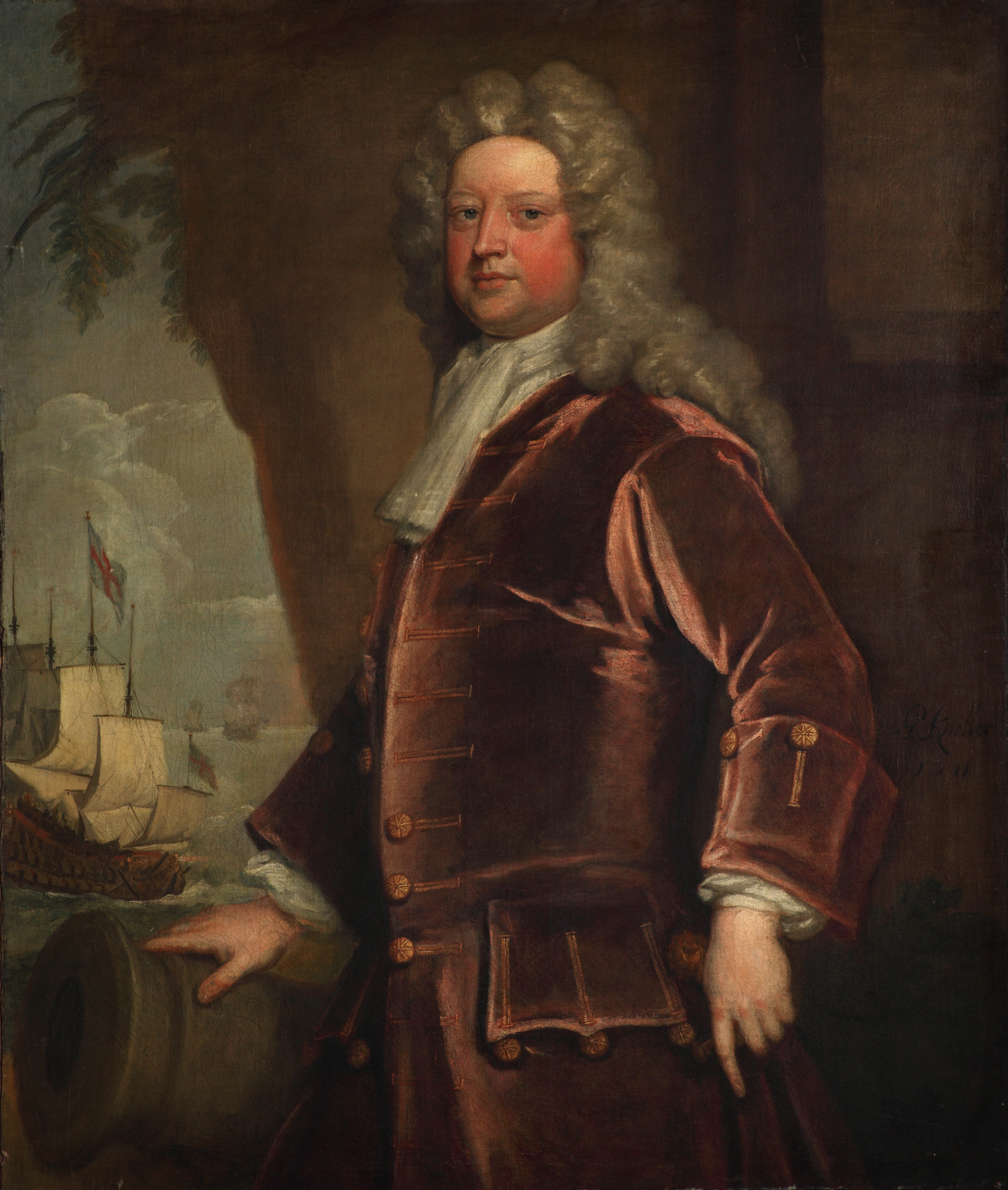
Sir John Norris, under whom Hughes often served

Hughes stayed in Nottingham only briefly, moving in the same rank to the 80-gun ship of the line HMS Chichester on 20 September when his father was given command of her. He served in Chichester, also in the Baltic Fleet, until 23 June of the following year when he was made an able seaman on board the 50-gun fourth rate HMS Leopard, which was serving in home waters. Hughes was then promoted to midshipman in the 70-gun ship of the line HMS Edinburgh, also commanded by his father, on 13 July 1723 and passed his examination for his lieutenancy on 18 December 1725. Throughout this time Edinburgh served as the guardship at Blackstakes, Kent.

Hughes was promoted to lieutenant on 28 July 1726 and posted to the 70-gun ship of the line HMS Grafton to serve as that ship's fourth lieutenant in the Baltic. He was advanced to become Grafton's third lieutenant on 20 April 1727 and then on 26 July 1728 transferred to the 80-gun ship of the line HMS Cornwall when his father gained command of her, serving as that ship's second lieutenant on guardship duties at the Nore. On 8 February 1729 he was moved to become Cornwall's third lieutenant, before being translated into the 80-gun ship of the line HMS Princess Amelia, the flagship of Vice-Admiral Sir George Walton in the Mediterranean Fleet, as that ship's fourth lieutenant on 12 April.

Hughes served in Princess Amelia until 16 December and then went on a period of half pay before joining his next ship, the 50-gun fourth rate HMS Salisbury, on 4 February 1731. Salisbury sailed to the Newfoundland Station later in the year; Hughes served there as her second lieutenant until 8 May 1732 when he was advanced to become first lieutenant of the 60-gun fourth rate HMS Sunderland, guardship at Sheerness. He became Sunderland's second lieutenant on 15 February 1733. Hughes continued to serve as such in Sunderland until 6 May 1735 when he became the sixth lieutenant of the 100-gun ship of the line HMS Britannia, Norris's flagship off Lisbon. He stayed in Britannia until 16 October and then went on an extended period of half pay. This ended on 12 June 1739 when he was appointed as the first lieutenant of the 90-gun ship of the line HMS Namur, which was Norris's new flagship for service in home waters.

=== Command ===
Hughes was promoted to commander on 3 July and given command of the new 8-gun fireship HMS Anne Galley, serving in the Mediterranean Fleet of Rear-Admiral Nicholas Haddock as part of the War of the Austrian Succession. On 24 October 1740 he was promoted to post-captain and sent to command the 20-gun frigate HMS Dursley Galley, also in the Mediterranean. He was employed in escorting the main fleet and in cruising short distances away from it on patrols, but the presence of the large fleet meant that French and Spanish ships refused to leave harbour, and Dursley Galley found no action in this period. On 10 July 1741 he was briefly appointed as acting Commander-in-Chief, Portsmouth.

Hughes was advanced to command the 40-gun frigate HMS Faversham on 25 July 1742 and in August of that year was attached to a squadron under the command of Commodore William Martin which sailed to Naples and forced the country to confirm its neutrality in the conflict under the threat of bombardment and attack by the British. Hughes left Faversham in August 1743 and in January 1744 sat as one of the presiding officers in the court martial of Captain Richard Norris at Mahon. He received his next command, still in the Mediterranean, on 1 April when he was given the 50-gun fourth rate HMS Chatham, a ship that had been commanded by his father between 1706 and 1710.

Hughes was given command of a small squadron off the coast of Italy, with which he protected trade and convoys going along the coast in support of the allied armies on land. On 18 August Hughes was moved to another ship of the fleet, the 70-gun ship of the line HMS Essex, which he left on 25 October 1748 when she was put in for a refit. His next command came on 10 January 1753 when he was given the newly recommissioned 64-gun ship of the line HMS Fougueux, a captured French vessel. Fougueux was stationed as the guardship at Portsmouth and was Hughes's last ship command.

=== Commissioner ===
On 12 February 1754 Hughes was appointed as the Resident Commissioner at Portsmouth upon the retirement of his father from that same position. The historian Daniel A. Baugh suggests that Hughes only embarked on a career at sea in order to qualify to eventually succeed his father at Portsmouth, comparing the Hughes family with the similar career paths of Sir Richard Haddock and his son Richard Haddock, both serving as Comptroller of the Navy.

Hughes continued at Portsmouth, highly successfully, until he retired from the navy, still a captain, on 25 August 1773. On 17 July that year, Hughes hosted George III at a visit of the dockyard and in reward for this service of "great magnificence" he was made a baronet. In retirement he was given a pension of £500 a year, dying at Southampton on 23 September 1779, aged 71. (Note: Other sources give Hughes's date of death as April 1779 or 1782.)

== Family ==
Hughes married Joanne Collyer, the daughter of Captain William Collyer of Deptford, some time in the 1720s; together they had two sons and two daughters:

- Mary Hughes (d.1824), married Captain Thomas Collingwood; he died in 1780 and she next married Colonel Nathaniel Heywood, a gentleman of the bedchamber to Prince William Henry
- Sarah Hughes, died unmarried
- Admiral Sir Richard Hughes, 2nd Baronet (1724–5 January 1812)
- Reverend Sir Robert Hughes, 3rd Baronet (17 September 1739 – 4 June 1814)

== Notes and citations ==
=== Citations ===
Baronetage of Great Britain
New creation	Baronet (of East Bergholt); 1773–1779	Succeeded by Richard Hughes
