= Downs Station =

- Active: 1626–1834
- Country: United Kingdom
- Branch: Royal Navy
- Type: Naval formation
- Part of: Royal Navy
- Garrison/HQ: Deal, Kent, England

The Downs Station also known as the Commander-in-Chief, the Downs or Admiral Commanding at the Downs was a formation of the Kingdom of Great Britain and then the United Kingdom's Royal Navy based at Deal. It was a major command of the Royal Navy from 1626 until 1834.

The Downs is a roadstead (area of sheltered, favourable sea) in the southern North Sea near the English Channel off the east Kent coast. It is primarily known in naval history for the Dutch defeat of the Spanish in the Battle of the Downs in 1639.

== History ==
The Downs served as permanent base for naval vessels operating out of Deal, Kent.

It served as a base for warships patrolling the North Sea. The command generally covered an area in the southern North Sea near the English Channel off the east Kent coast. The station lasted until 1815, when it was absorbed into the Commander-in-Chief, The Nore's control, whose role and geographic area of responsibility was re-defined by the Admiralty.

== Commanders in chief ==
Incomplete list includes:
No = died in post

- Commodore Sir Henry Palmer, 1626
- Rear-Admiral Sir John Penington, 1626–1631
- Vice-Admiral Sir John Penington, 1638–1645
- Vice-Admiral Sir John Mennes, 1645–1649
- Rear-Admiral Richard Badiley, 1649–1650
- Vice-Admiral John Lawson, 1650–1656
- Vice-Admiral Richard Badiley, 1656 No
- Admiral Sir Edward Montagu, 1657–1663
- Commodore Thomas Allin, 1663–1664
- Admiral Sir William Penn, 1664–1666
- Vice-Admiral Sir John Holmes, 1667–1679
- Commodore Stafford Fairborne, 1695–1697
- Rear-Admiral Basil Beaumont, 1699–1703 No
- Commodore Richard Griffith, 1707
- Commodore Gerard Ellwes, 1707–1708
- Commodore Charles Cornwall, 1709–1710
- Commodore Tudor Trevor, 1711–1712
- Rear-Admiral Sir Charles Wager, 1712–1714
- Captain Edward Vernon, 1716
- Commodore Philip Cavendish, 1716
- Admiral Edward Vernon, 1745
- Vice-Admiral William Martin, 1745
- Commodore Matthew Michell, 1745–1748
- Admiral Thomas Smith, 1755–1758
- Commodore Sir Peircy Brett, 1758–1761
- Commodore John Moore, 1761–1766
- Rear-Admiral John Montagu, 1771
- Commodore John Elliot, 1777–1778
- Vice-Admiral Matthew Buckle, 1778–1779
- Vice-Admiral Francis William Drake, 1779–1782
- Rear-Admiral John Evans, 1780–1781*
- Rear-Admiral Sir Richard Hughes, 1781–1782*

Station not active 1782 to 1790

- Rear-Admiral Sir Richard King, 1790–1791

Station not active 1791 to 1793

- Rear-Admiral John MacBride, 1793–1794
- Vice-Admiral Joseph Peyton, 1794–1799
- Rear-Admiral John Bazely, 1796–1797*
- Vice-Admiral Skeffington Lutwidge, 1799–1802
- Rear-Admiral Edward Thornbrough, 1803
- Vice-Admiral Philip Patton, 1803–1804
- Vice-Admiral John Holloway, 1804–1807
- Vice-Admiral Bartholomew Rowley, 1807–1808
- Vice-Admiral George Campbell, 1808–1811
- Vice-Admiral Sir Thomas Foley, 1811–1815
- Rear-Admiral William Hall Gage, 1833.

Temporary command in absence of senior officer *
