= Bazeley =

Bazeley or Bazely may refer to:

== People ==
- Bazeley (surname)
- Bazely (surname)

== Ships ==
- USS Bazely (1863), a Union Navy tugboat/patrol boat during the American Civil War
- HMS Bazely, a Lend-Lease destroyer escort (originally USS Bazely)
