= French ship Fougueux =

At least two ships of the French Navy have been named Fougueux:

- French ship Fougueux (1747), a Lys-class ship of the line launched in 1747 and captured by the Royal Navy the same year. Put into British service as HMS Fougueux.
- French ship Fougueux (1785), a Téméraire-class ship of the line launched in 1785 and wrecked in 1805
- French destroyer Fougueux, a L'Adroit-class destroyer launched in 1928 and sunk in 1942
