= Capture of Vigo and Pontevedra =

1719 military operation

- Part of War of the Quadruple Alliance
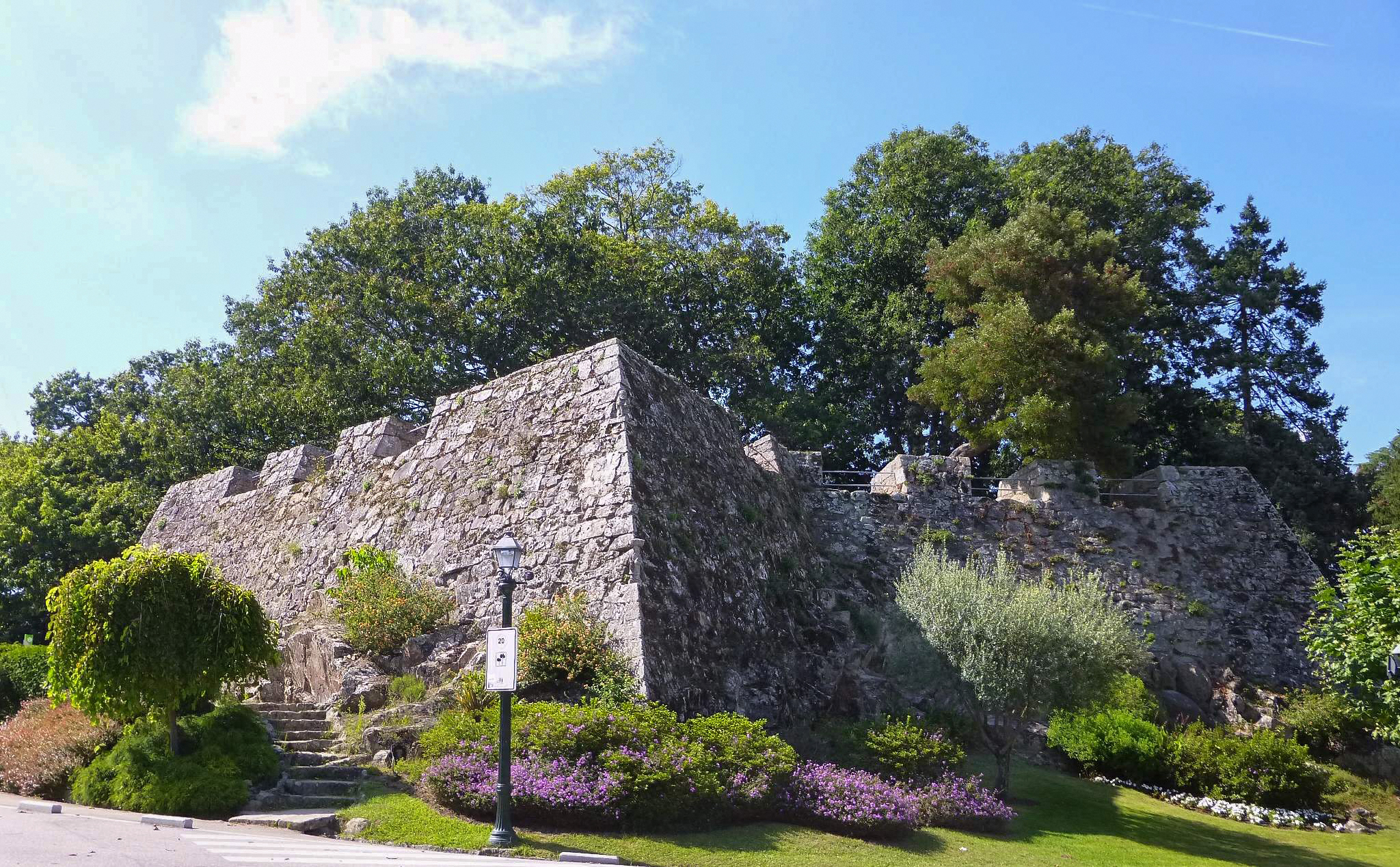
- Present day view of Fort Castro in Vigo which was captured by the British in 1719
Date	10 October 1719
Location	Galicia, Spain
Result	British victory: Capture of Pontevedra, Vigo and Redondela

Belligerents
Great Britain	Spain

Commanders and leaders
(Kingdom of Great Britain) Lord Cobham (Kingdom of Great Britain) James Mighels (Kingdom of Great Britain) George Wade	(Spain) Fadrique González de Soto

Strength
1 ship of the line 3 frigates 8 bomb vessels and fire-ships 4,000 soldiers	3 Forts; ~1,000 soldiers & militia

Casualties and losses
300 casualties, sick or dead to disease	Vigo; 300 killed or wounded 468 captured 7 ships captured or burned Pontevedra; 200 captured

The capture of Vigo and Pontevedra (also known as the British expedition to Vigo and Pontevedra) occurred in October 1719 during the War of the Quadruple Alliance when a British expedition made a descent on the Spanish coast. They then captured the settlements of Vigo, Redondela and Pontevedra after some resistance, which they occupied for ten days destroying or capturing a vast haul of military stores before withdrawing.

== Background ==
The Spanish involvement in the Jacobite rising of 1719 had seen Spanish troops land in Scotland in order to help an uprising but where they were defeated at the Battle of Glen Shiel. A British force was prepared for a retaliatory strike against Spain. The expedition was under the overall command of Lord Cobham with the naval forces commanded by Vice Admiral James Mighels which included four ships – the 70-gun ship of the line HMS Ipswich, and three frigates – HMS Enterprise (42 guns), HMS Biddeford (36 guns) and HMS Kinsale (24 guns). There were a number of transports and bomb vessels holding 6,000 troops commanded by Major-General John Wade. The expedition was also intended to demonstrate to the Spanish that Allied forces could strike along their vulnerable coastline with ease, and was co-ordinated with a French offensive on eastern Spain, in the hope that this would force Spain to the peace table.

== Expedition ==
=== Vigo ===
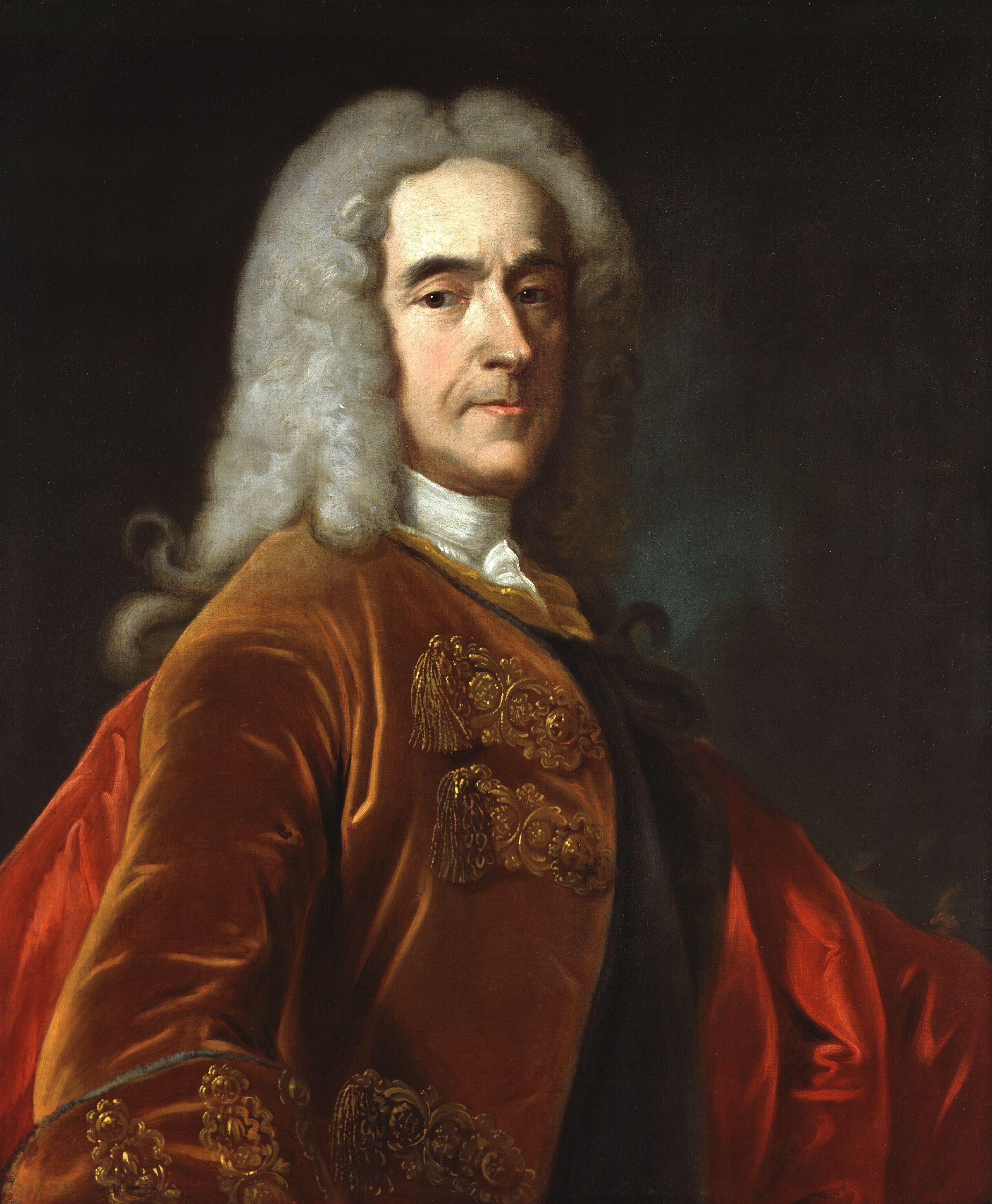
Richard Temple, 1st Viscount Cobham – the British commander

On 21 September the British expedition left Falmouth, and arrived at Vigo eight days later. The fleet at once entered the harbour and landed troops on a beach about three miles from the town led by the grenadiers. On 1 October, the army occupied a strong position under the walls of the San Sebastián fort opposite Fort Castro situated on an eminence commanding the town and harbour. In the evening Brigadier Philip Honeywood with 800 soldiers launched an assault on San Sebastián and took the Spanish defenders by surprise; they spiked their guns and withdrew to the citadel. A bomb ketch was brought up two days later; but little damage was done due to the range, so forty mortars were brought ashore from the fleet. On the 3rd and 4th several siege cannons were landed from the fleet were added to the artillery of San Sebastián.

On 10 October a heavy bombardment opened up the citadel – the Spanish finding themselves outnumbered and no hope of relief decided to surrender. The full garrison composed of seven companies of the Regiment of Spain, and four of the Regiment of Valencia, commanded by Don Fadrique González de Soto. Some 469 officers and men marched out and another 300 were killed or wounded in the assault and bombardment. British loss was six killed and another twenty wounded. A large quantity of guns, small arms, and ammunition were found and the stores were captured or destroyed. Also intelligence from prisoners stated that this was for an invasion of England. Sixty large pieces of cannon were spiked and rendered useless in the town and in the citadel forty three artillery pieces of which fifteen were brass and two large mortars were also given the same fate. In addition seven ships were seized in the harbour, of which three were fitted out for privateers. The troops also found stores of wine and many quenched their thirst; there was some drunken disorder for three days. Cobham ordered the rest of the wine to be placed in the fleet for shipment to add to the booty.

=== Redondela ===
On 10 October Cobham ordered Major General George Wade to embark with 1,000 soldiers and marines on board four transports to proceed to the bay of Pontevedra. Meanwhile, with Vigo secure, 2,000 troops were left to hold the place while Cobham also ordered an advance further inland. A small force came across the town of Redondela but was found undefended, with its old fort in ruins; the British burned and pillaged its stores as well.

=== Pontevedra ===
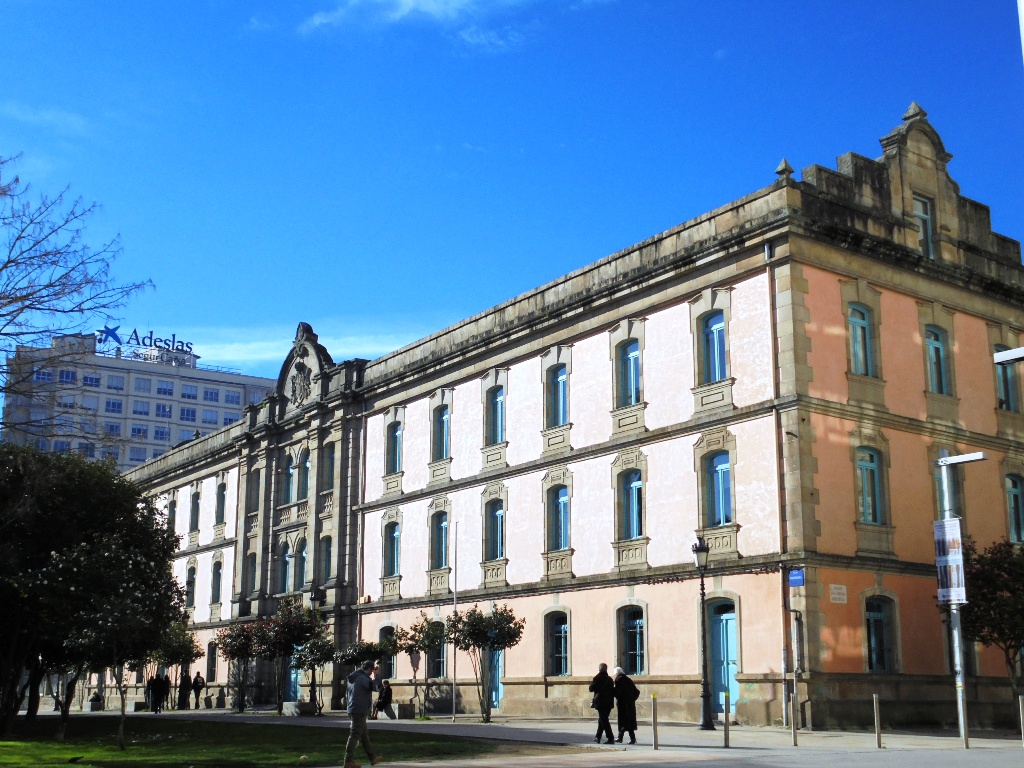
Present day view of Real Maestranza Barracks in Pontevedra which was captured by the British in 1719

A landing was effected at Pontevedra on 14 October and the British overcame any Spanish resistance. They were able to advance through the town via the upper end of the harbour. Fort Marin which defended the town was the next obstacle and in assault was easily captured by a force of 100 grenadiers led by John Ligonier. Resistance collapsed and Pontevedra was in British hands by the end of the day. With the fort consolidated, 86 guns of various calibres were spiked, and the arsenal was burned. Wade was able to levy a contribution of £40,000 from Santiago de Compostela after threatening to advance on the place. The citizens of Pontevedra fled in the face of the British assault, leaving the town deserted; British forces proceeded to burn numerous buildings in the city unopposed, including the Real Maestranza Barracks. Realising they had achieved complete success, the British commanders decided there was little point in holding the area, and enough damage had been done to impede further Spanish attempts against the British Isles.

== Aftermath ==
On 24 October Cobham re embarked the army and two days later the fleet sailed for England. On 11 November, Vice-Admiral Mighells put into Falmouth with most of the transports. The booty was huge – the total number brought home was 190 iron and 30 brass heavy guns, with 10,000 fire arms, 2,000 barrels of powder, and other stores. The expedition had been prompt and successful: it had fully attained its objective. By sickness, desertion, and combat it had lost no more than 300 men. This caused some shock to the Spanish authorities as they realized how vulnerable they were to Allied amphibious descents, with the potential to open up a new front away from the French frontier.

== See also ==
- Francis Drake's descent on Vigo
- Battle of Vigo Bay
