= Bazely (surname) =

Bazely is a surname, and may refer to:

- Dawn R. Bazely (born 1960), Indian-born Canadian biologist
- Henry Bazely (1842–1883), non-conformist minister of the Church of Scotland
- John Bazely (1740–1809), Scottish Royal Navy admiral
- Paul Bazely (born 1968), English actor
- Sally Bazely (born 1933), British television actress

== See also ==
- Bazeley (surname)
