= Admiral Evans =

Admiral Evans may refer to:

- Alfred Evans (Royal Navy officer) (1884–1944), British Royal Navy vice admiral
- Charles Evans (Royal Navy officer) (1908–1981), British Royal Navy vice admiral
- Edward Evans, 1st Baron Mountevans (1880–1957), British Royal Navy admiral
- John Evans (Royal Navy officer) (1717–1794), British Royal Navy admiral
- Marsha J. Evans (born 1947), U.S. Navy rear admiral
- Robley D. Evans (admiral) (1846–1912), U.S. Navy rear admiral
- Stephen C. Evans (born 1963), U.S. Navy rear admiral

== See also ==
- Edward Evans-Lombe (1901–1974), British Royal Navy vice admiral
