= Captain Haddock (disambiguation) =

Captain Haddock mostly refers to the fictional character in The Adventures of Tintin by Hergé. The name may also refer to:

- Herbert Haddock, British merchant navy officer; first captain of RMS Titanic (1861–1946)
- Richard Haddock, British naval officer (c.1629–1715)
- Richard Haddock (Royal Navy officer, born 1673), British naval officer and the latter's son (1673–1751)
