= HMS Temple =

Ship of the line of the Royal Navy

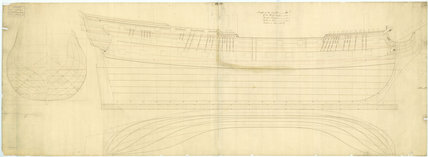
- Temple

History

Great Britain
- Name: HMS Temple
- Ordered: 9 September 1756
- Builder: Blades, Hull
- Launched: 3 November 1758
- Fate: Wrecked, 1762

General characteristics
- Class & type: 68-gun third rate ship of the line
- Tons burthen: 142876/94 (bm)
- Length: 160 ft (49 m) (gundeck)
- Beam: 45 ft (14 m)
- Depth of hold: 19 ft 4 in (5.89 m)
- Propulsion: Sails
- Sail plan: Full-rigged ship
- Armament: 68 guns: Gundeck: 26 × 32 pdrs; Upper gundeck: 28 × 18 pdrs; Quarterdeck: 12 × 9 pdrs; Forecastle: 2 × 9 pdrs

HMS Temple was a 68-gun third rate ship of the line of the Royal Navy, launched on 3 November 1758 at Blaydes Yard in Hull.

Commissioned in January 1759 under the command of Washington Shirley, she saw service at the Battle of Quiberon Bay in November.

The following year, in March 1760, she sailed for the West Indies under Captain Lucius O'Brien. With the aid of the cutter Griffin, in September of that year she recaptured the sloop Virgin off Grenada.

Temple operated as part of the fleet at the capture of Havana in 1762, under the command of Julian Legge. From June to September she was commanded by Chaloner Ogle and thereafter by Thomas Collingwood.

On 18 December of that year, en route home to England, she developed severe leaks off Cape Clear Island and foundered at sea and was lost.
