= Sir Richard Hughes, 2nd Baronet =

Royal Navy Admiral (c. 1724–1812)

Admiral Sir Richard Hughes Bt
- Born: c. 1724
- Died: 5 January 1812 (aged 82–83)
- Spouse: Jane Sloane
- Military career
- Allegiance: United Kingdom
- Branch: Royal Navy
- Service years: 1739–1812
- Rank: Admiral
- Commands: HMS Spy; HMS Hind; HMS Active; HMS Falmouth; HMS York; HMS Portland; HMS Boreas; HMS Firm; HMS Worcester; HMS Centaur; Resident Commissioner, Halifax; Lieutenant Governor of Nova Scotia; Downs Station; Leeward Islands Station; North America Station
- Conflicts: War of the Austrian Succession; Seven Years' War; Raid on St Malo; American Revolutionary War; Battle of Cape Spartel

Admiral Sir Richard Hughes, 2nd Baronet (c. 1724 – 5 January 1812) was a Royal Navy officer.

== Naval career ==
Hughes was probably born in London, England, the son of Captain Richard Hughes. He entered the Portsmouth Naval Academy in 1739. He served on a number of ships in various locations during his naval career, including HMS Boreas from 1763 to 1766. It is known that Hughes was in Canada in 1778, as he was appointed resident commissioner of the Halifax dockyard. This appointment was short, as by August of the same year he became governor of Nova Scotia, succeeding Mariot Arbuthnot in that position. During his tenure, the main concern was the protection of the Province. In 1779, he succeeded his father as baronet. He became acting commander-in-chief The Downs in 1781.

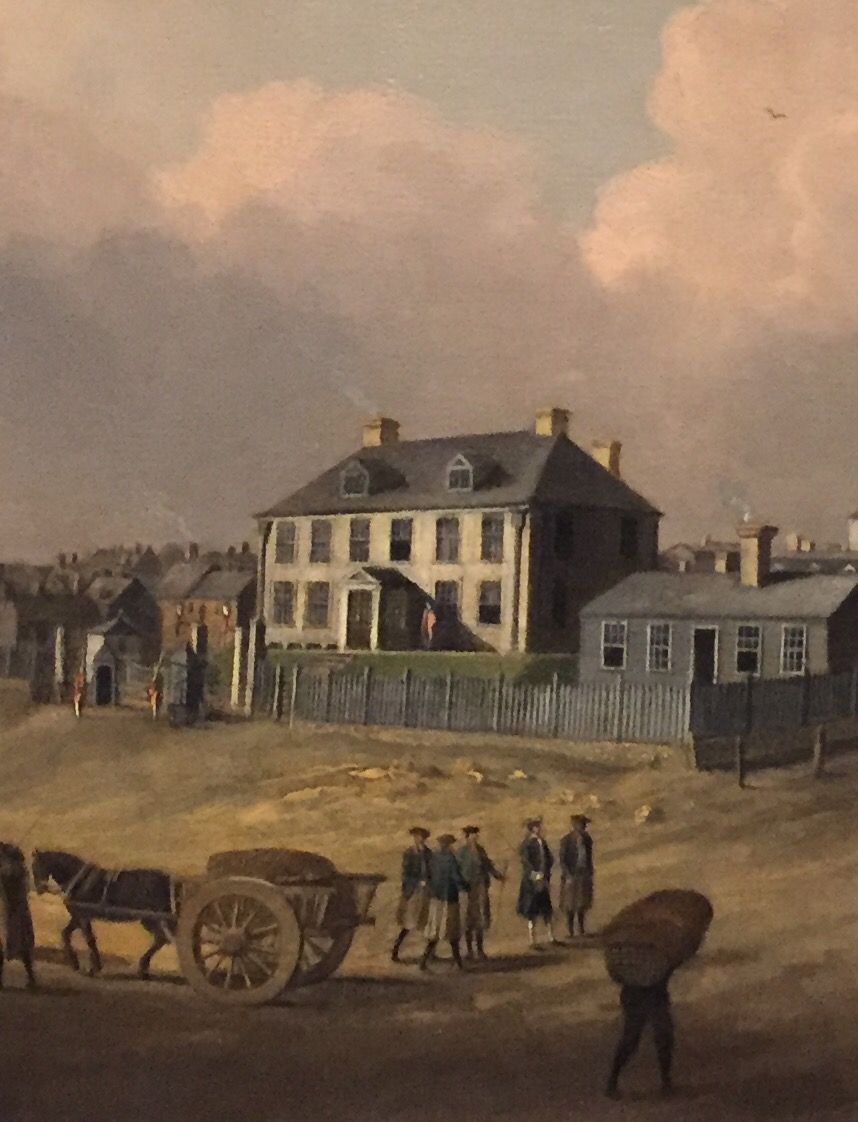
Governor Hughes' residence (built 1749). (Located on the site of Province House, which still is furnished with his Nova Scotia Council table)

In 1782 Hughes was second-in-command under Lord Howe at the Relief of Gibraltar. Between 1783 and 1786 he was appointed Commander-in-Chief, Leeward Islands Station. Then in 1789 he became Commander-in-Chief, North American Station.

== Legacy ==
- Fort Hughes (Nova Scotia) (est. 1778)
- Fort Hughes (New Brunswick) (est. 1781)

== Arms ==
Coat of arms of Sir Richard Hughes, 2nd Baronet
Crest A lion couchant Or. Escutcheon Azure a lion rampant Or

Government offices
Preceded by Mariot Arbuthnot	Lieutenant Governor of Nova Scotia; 1778–1781; Served under: Francis Legge	Succeeded by Sir Andrew Hamond
Military offices
Preceded by Marriott Arbuthnot	Resident Commissioner, Halifax; 1778–1781	Succeeded by Andrew Snape Hamond
Preceded by John Evans	Commander-in-Chief, The Downs (Acting); 1781–1782	Vacant
Preceded by Hugh Pigot	Commander-in-Chief, Leeward Islands Station; 1783–1786	Succeeded by Sir Richard Bickerton
Preceded by Sir Herbert Sawyer	Commander-in-Chief, North American Station; 1789–1792	Succeeded by George Murray
Baronetage of Great Britain
Preceded by Richard Hughes	Baronet (of East Bergholt); 1779–1812	Succeeded by Robert Hughes
