= Sir Charles Douglas, 1st Baronet =

British naval officer

Rear-Admiral Sir Charles Douglas Bt
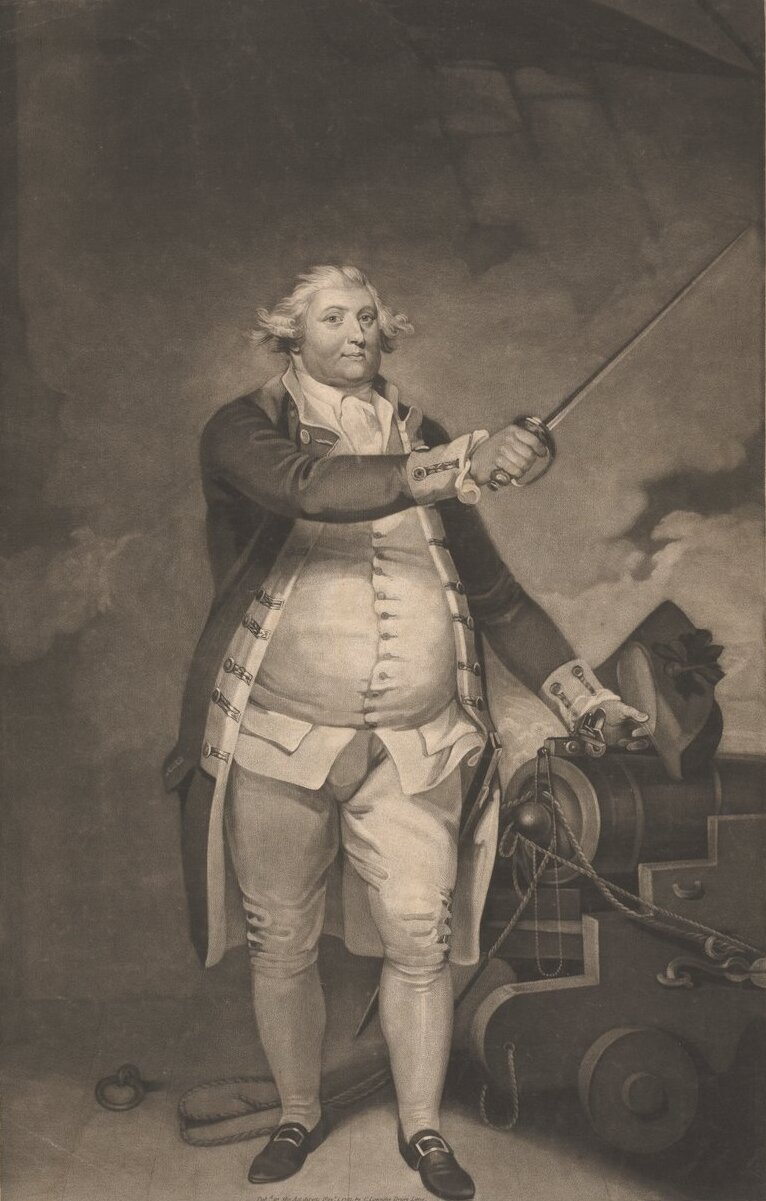
- Mezzotint by John Jones after a Henry Singleton portrait, 1791
- Born: 1727; Carr, Perthshire
- Died: 17 March 1789 (aged 61–62); Edinburgh, Scotland
- Relatives: Vice-Admiral Sir William Henry Douglas (son), General Sir Howard Douglas (son)
- Military career
- Allegiance: Great Britain; Dutch Republic; Russia
- Branch: Royal Navy; Dutch States Navy; Imperial Russian Navy
- Service years: 1740–1789
- Rank: Rear admiral
- Conflicts: French and Indian War; Siege of Louisbourg (1758); American War of Independence; Battle of Ushant (1778); Battle of the Saintes
- Awards: Baronetcy

Rear-Admiral Sir Charles Douglas, 1st Baronet (1727 – 17 March 1789) was a British naval officer. He is particularly known for his part in the Battle of the Saintes during the American War of Independence where he helped pioneer the tactic of "breaking the line".

== Early career ==
Douglas was born in Carr, Perthshire, Scotland to Charles Ayton Douglas and Christian Hepburn of Kinglassie. Little is known of his early life, although it is established that he could speak six languages. He joined the Royal Navy at the age of twelve, and spent some time in the Dutch States Navy before resuming his career with the British navy.

== French and Indian War ==
He was a midshipman at the Siege of Louisbourg (1745), promoted to lieutenant in 1753 and to commander in 1759. By the end of the war in 1763, he was captain of HMS Syren. While commanding the Syren, Sir Charles reported the attack on St. John's and took part in recapturing Newfoundland.

Following the war, Sir Charles went to Saint Petersburg to help re-organize the Russian navy for Catherine the Great in 1764–1765.

He was elected a Fellow of the Royal Society in May, 1770 for carrying out "a series of curious experiments to determine the different degrees of cold at different depths in the Sea".

== American War of Independence ==
After the American War of Independence broke out in America in 1775, Douglas was given command of a squadron to relieve Quebec from the siege. When he arrived at the Gulf of St. Lawrence, he decided to ram the ice and successfully made his way up the river, surprising the Americans and putting them on the run. He was also in charge of creating a navy from scratch to fight on Lake Champlain, and that small fleet routed the Americans under Benedict Arnold. In 1777, he was made a baronet for his service in Quebec. As captain of HMS Stirling Castle, he took part in the first Battle of Ushant.

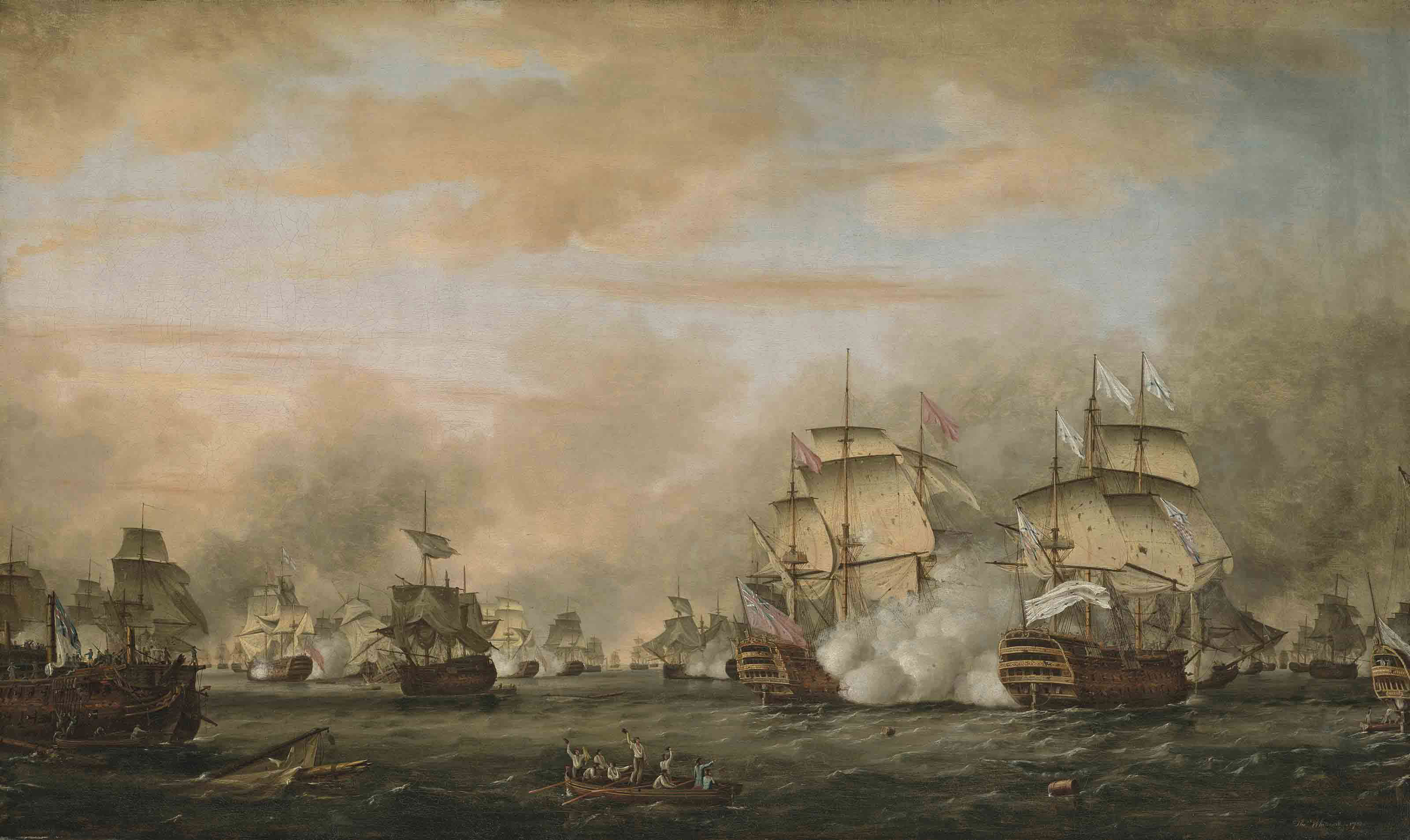
The Battle of the Saintes, 12 April 1782: surrender of the Ville de Paris by Thomas Whitcombe, painted 1783

In 1781, Sir Charles became Captain-of-the-Fleet for George Brydges Rodney, 1st Baron Rodney, and was with Rodney on his flagship, Formidable, at the Battle of the Saintes off Dominica, where on 12 April 1782, they defeated the Comte de Grasse by breaking the French line. Douglas is credited by many, including Sir Charles Dashwood (a midshipman present at the time who later became an admiral himself), for having the idea for the manoeuvre, but it is a subject of much debate.

In 1783, he was made the Commander-in-Chief of North America at the Halifax, Nova Scotia Station, but resigned due to a conflict. In 1787 he became a rear-admiral, and in 1789 was once again made commander of the Nova Scotia station, but died of apoplexy before taking his post.

== Naval career ==
- 1740 Joined Royal Navy at age twelve
- 1745 Midshipman at Siege of Louisbourg
- 1747 Past-Midshipman on HMS Centurion
- 1753 Lieutenant in the Royal Navy
- 1759 Promoted to Commander; Commander of HMS Boscawen
- 1761 Made Post-Captain; Commander of HMS Unicorn, 28 guns
- 1762 Commander of HMS Syren, 20 guns, Newfoundland
- 1763 Commander of HMS Tweed, 32 guns Newfoundland
- 1767 Commander of HMS Emerald, 32 guns
- 1770 Commander of HMS St. Albans, 61 guns
- 1774 Commander of HMS Ardent, 64 guns
- 1775 Commander of HMS Isis (1774), 50 guns, Quebec
- 1776 Commodore in charge of building Lake Champlain fleet
- 1777 Commander of HMS Stirling Castle, 64 Guns
- 1778 Commander of HMS Duke, 98 guns, Channel Fleet
- 1781 Captain-of-the-Fleet of Sir George Rodney, flagship HMS Formidable, West Indies
- 1783 Commodore and Commander-in-Chief of Halifax Station, HMS Assistance, 50 guns, HMS Hermione, 32 guns
- 1787 Promoted to Rear-Admiral
- 1789 Commander-in-Chief of North American Station, HMS London Man, 50 guns

== Personal life ==
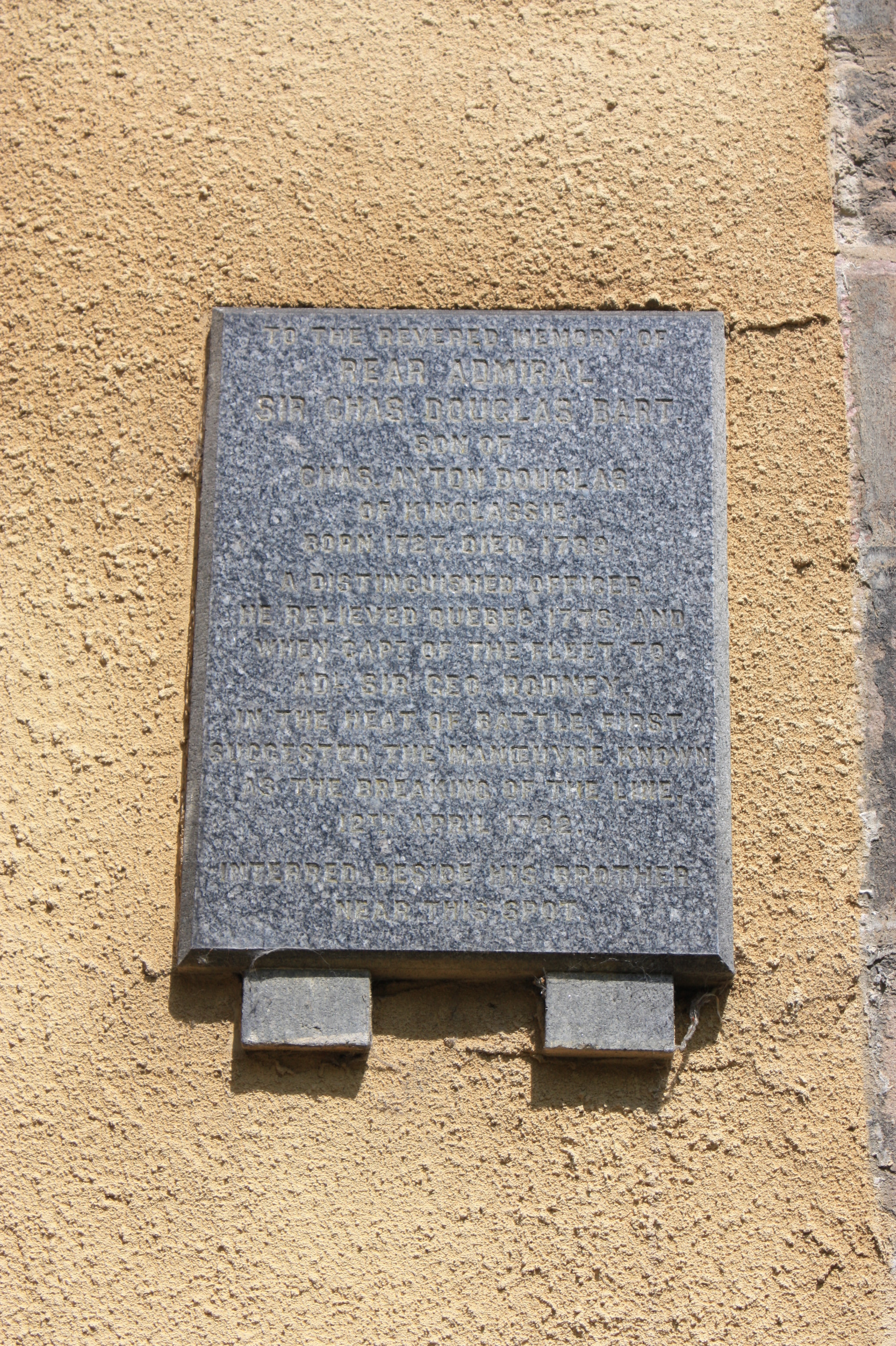
The memorial to Admiral Charles Douglas, Greyfriars Kirkyard

Douglas was married three times: first to a Dutch woman called Uranie Lidie Marteilhe, with whom he had a son and a daughter; second to Sarah Wood of Yorkshire, the mother of Sir Howard Douglas; and third to a woman named Jane, daughter of John Baillie. There is a great deal of confusion regarding the identity of Sir Charles' third wife, whose last name has been variously reported as Baillie, Grew, and Brisbane. It appears that some sources have mistaken his sister, Helena Baillie, for his third wife because she raised his younger children while he was at sea. The name Helen Brisbaine is also an error based on a mistake in The Scottish Nation (1862) where it says she was married to Admiral Sir Charles Douglas when, in fact, she was the wife of Admiral Sir James Douglas. When his eldest daughter, Lydia Mariana, married Rev. Richard Bingham against his wishes, he disinherited her. Following his death, Lydia and her husband sued for a share of his estate, and the case was appealed until finally being decided against them in the House of Lords in 1796. The case is made famous because of a letter Lydia had written to Adam Smith, a friend and distant relative of Sir Charles, requesting his assistance in reconciling the father and daughter.

Douglas is buried in the ground south of the church in Greyfriars Kirkyard in Edinburgh and a memorial lies on the outer south face of the church near the east gable.

== Legacy ==
Sir Charles was known as a mechanical genius, and many of his suggestions for improvements on naval vessels, including the substitution of flintlocks for matches, were adopted by the Admiralty for the entire Royal Navy.

He was succeeded as Baronet of Carr by his sons, Vice-Admiral Sir William Henry Douglas, 2nd Baronet, and General Sir Howard Douglas, 3rd Baronet, who became a General, lieutenant-governor of New Brunswick, MP for Liverpool, and Lord High Chancellor of the Ionian Islands.

Both Douglastown and Douglas Township, (the village of Kennetcook, Nova Scotia and surrounding area), are named after him. The song "Caillich Odhar" was composed by Nathaniel Gow in his honor.

Military offices
Preceded by Robert Digby	Commander-in-Chief, North American Station; 1783–1785	Succeeded by Sir Herbert Sawyer
Baronetage of Great Britain
New creation	Baronet (of Carr); 1777–1789	Succeeded by William Douglas
