= Thomas Collingwood =

British Royal Navy commander (c.1730 – 1780)

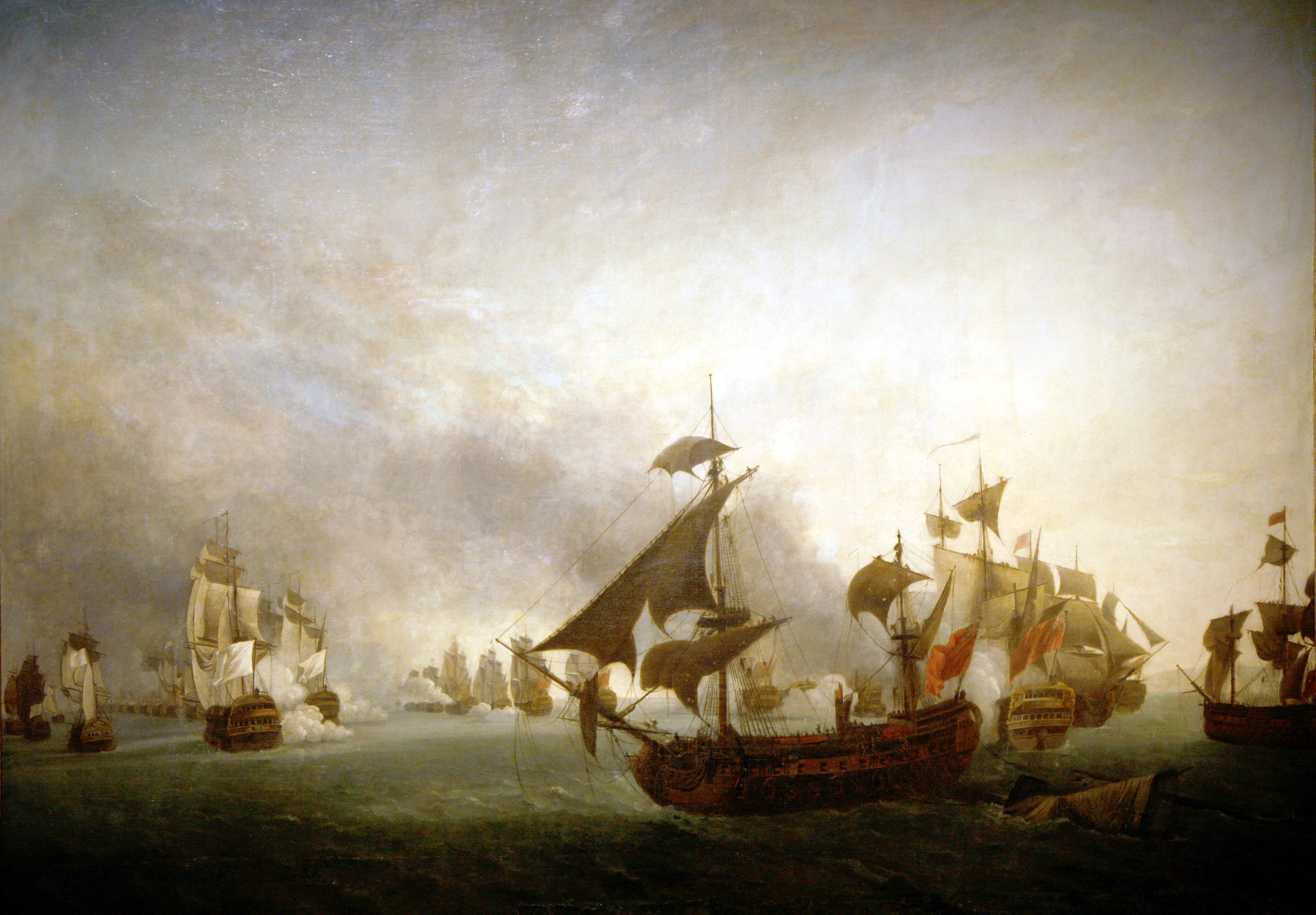
Painting of the Battle of Grenada

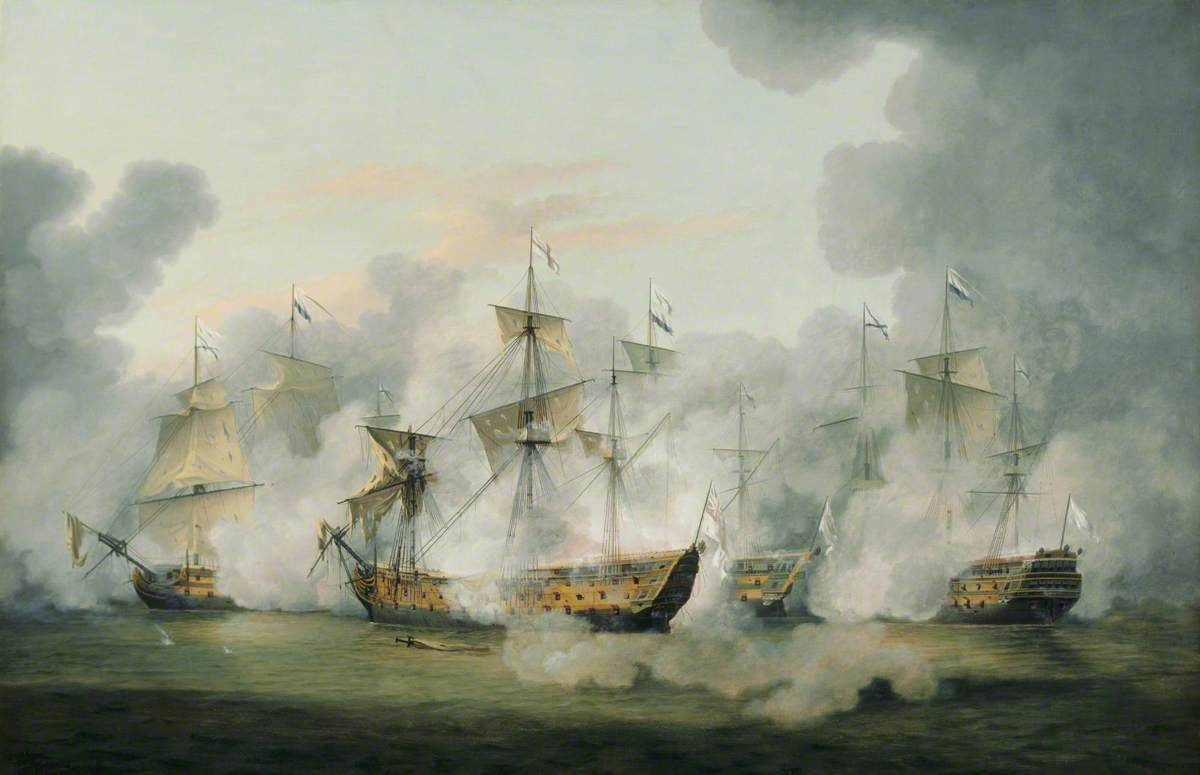
Painting of the Battle of Martinique

Thomas Collingwood (c.1730 – 1780) was a British Royal Navy commander, who served on HMS Fortune, HMS Siren, and HMS Jersey, among others. Collingwood played an important role in the Battle of Grenada and the Battle of Martinique (1780).

== Life and career ==
Thomas Collingwood was promoted to lieutenant on 28 October 1750.

On 9 September 1756 he was assigned command of the ship HMS Fortune, a vessel used to transmit Vice Admiral Sir Edward Hawke's messages from Minorca to Barcelona. Collingwood used the Fortune to capture a French xebec in the port of Marseilles, in addition to messenger services. He was promoted to captain two months later and given command of the frigate HMS Siren (1745).

The Siren was stationed in the Mediterranean around Sardinia and chased the French man-of-war "La Nymphe" from Sardinia to the Barbary Coast in February 1757 but was unable to catch her or engage in combat. On 25 March 1757 she travelled to Cagliari to assist HMS Jersey in escort duties: despite six French men-of-war patrolling the seas, they were able to transport 20 commercial ships from Cagliari to Gibraltar through Leghorn with no casualties.

A newly outfitted French warship assaulted her off the coast of Cape Spartel in December 1757. The Siren was victorious after a 90-minute struggle. This sparked an issue in Morocco, where the British consul, James Read, was asked to make reparations on Britain's behalf for the ship's loss. He resisted and was imprisoned and tortured as a result. On 18 February 1758 Read committed suicide by shooting himself with his gun.

Meanwhile, Siren landed in Leghorn on 29 January with seven fishing vessels she had escorted from Gibraltar. She then worked with HMS Guernsey to transport different vessels from Leghorn, Naples, and Genoa back to Gibraltar without incident. She then took part in a convoy from Gibraltar to Portsmouth before being paid off temporarily to undergo significant repairs.

Collingwood had a spell of shore leave from June to October 1758 before gaining command of the newly launched HMS Crescent, which he subsequently carried to the Leeward Islands in the Caribbean as part of the activities against the French fleet there. On 22 February 1759, he was dispatched to look for French ships harassing British ships off the coast of the Isle of Wight. He fought and captured five French ships in different actions between August 1759 and March 1761. The British ship "Berkeley," which had been taken under the name "Le Berkeley," was among them. He was a member of the British navy that seized Martinique in January 1762.

In March 1762 he was promoted to captain of HMS Nottingham, which he led during the 6 June raid on Havana. In September 1762 he was promoted to captain of HMS Temple due to his continued performance. In October he set out to return her to England, but she capsized in the shallows near Cape Clear on 18 December 1762. Collingwood and the majority of the crew survived the accident, although it took some time to assign Collingwood a new command, as was customary in such situations, especially with a new ship.

After a few years of shore leave (on half pay), he was granted command of HMS Tweed in November 1766. Tweed's lone notable assignment was an envoy voyage to Russia (possibly mooring in St Petersburg).

From February 1770 until November 1771 he was on shore leave again before taking command of HMS Rainbow, which was deployed to monitor the west coast of Africa until 1774, when she was paid off. After another four years on shore leave, he was assigned command of HMS Monmouth in January 1778. However, command was transferred to Captain William Cumming before to Monmouth's participation in the Battle of Grenada. Collingwood was appointed command of HMS Fame in February 1779. Collingwood consequently took part in the Battle of Grenada on Fame rather than Monmouth on 6 July. Collingwood was transferred aboard HMS Grafton eight days after the engagement, most likely owing to Fame damage. Grafton was involved in the same conflict but appears to have escaped unharmed.

Two weeks after Collingwood took command of Grafton, the ship was promoted to flagship status in the Royal Navy, with Collingwood serving as Flag Officer. In this capacity, he was a key figure in the Battle of Martinique on 17 April 1780. Collingwood attributed the British defeat on his inability to appropriately alert other ships and his detachment from his own squadron. Admiral Rodney disagreed and attempted unsuccessfully to ease his guilt. Collingwood began to lose his mind and was placed aboard HMS Brilliant, which was to take him to Lisbon. Collingwood died one day after the decision to send him home was made. On 2 June 1780 he was buried at sea.

== Family ==
He was married to Mary Hughes (d.1824) daughter of Sir Richard Hughes Her great nephew Sir Thomas Collingwood Hughes (1800-1889) the 8th baronet of her father's line, was named in Collingwood's honour.
