= James Mighells =

Royal Navy officer

Vice-Admiral James Mighells
- Died: 21 March 1734
- Military career
- Allegiance: Kingdom of Great Britain
- Branch: Royal Navy
- Rank: Vice-Admiral
- Commands: HMS Monck

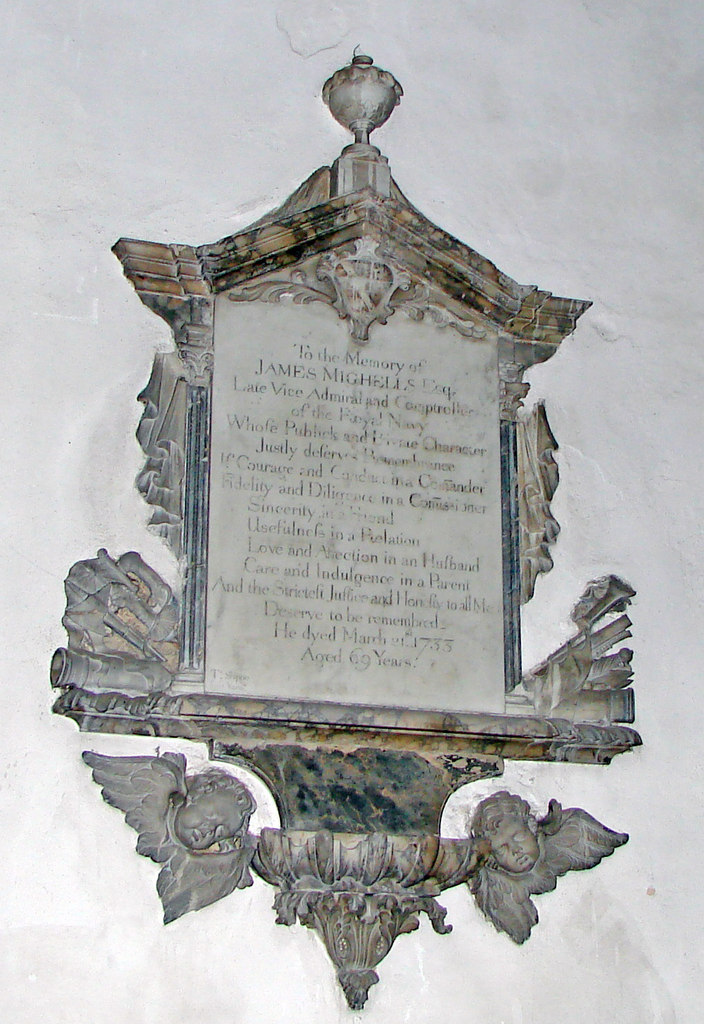
Wall memorial to James Mighells

Vice-Admiral James Mighells (died 21 March 1734) was a Royal Navy officer who became Comptroller of the Navy.

== Naval career ==
Mighells was appointed commander of HMS Monck and distinguished himself in a battle off Málaga in 1704. He commanded an expedition off the coast of Spain in 1719 during the War of the Quadruple Alliance. He led the naval contingent in the Raid on Vigo, a naval descent on the Spanish port town of Vigo. The land forces were under the command of Lord Cobham, who successfully occupied Vigo and sent forces into the surrounding countryside.

In 1722, he was appointed Comptroller of the Navy. He died on 21 March 1734 and is buried in Lowestoft Church.

Military offices
Preceded by Charles Wager	Comptroller of the Navy; 1722–1733	Succeeded by Richard Haddock
