= Resident Commissioner, Portsmouth Dockyard =

Office of the Resident Commissioner of the Navy at Portsmouth
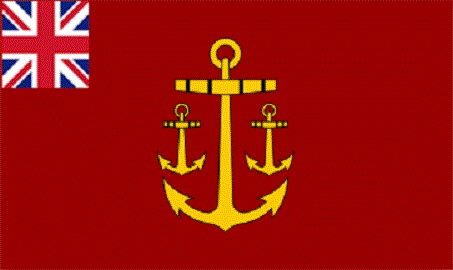
- Navy Board Flag
- Navy Office
- Member of: Navy Board (1649–1829)
- Reports to: Comptroller of the Navy
- Nominator: First Lord of the Admiralty
- Appointer: Prime Minister; Subject to formal approval by the King-in-Council
- Term length: Not fixed
- Inaugural holder: Lieutenant William Willoughby
- Formation: 1649–1829

The Resident Commissioner at Portsmouth also known as the Resident Commissioner of the Navy at Portsmouth was the chief representative of the Navy Board based at Portsmouth Dockyard. He was senior official of the yard responsible for the supervision of the principal officers of the yard from 1649 until 1829. In 1832 this office was superseded by the Admiral-Superintendent, Portsmouth.

== Office Holders ==
Incomplete list of post holders included:

- Lieutenant William Willoughby, 13 March 1649 – 30 March 1651
- Vice-Admiral Robert Moulton, 4 May 1651 – 22 September 1652
- Francis Willoughby, 22 September 1652 – 10 November 1664
- Thomas Middleton, 10 November 1664 – 30 September 1675
- Rear-Admiral Sir John Kempthorne, 30 September 1675 – 22 October 1679
- Rear-Admiral Richard Beach, 22 October 1679 – 26 March 1689
- Captain Thomas Wilshaw, 26 March 1689 – December 1693
- Captain Henry Greenhill, 26 March 1695 – 1702
- Captain Sir William Gifford, 18 June 1702 – 14 January 1705
- Captain Isaac Townsend, 14 January 1705 – 17 May 1713,
- Captain Isaac Townsend, 17 May 1713 – May 1729, (jointly with Seymour)
- Captain Sir Michael Seymour, 14 January 1729 – 28 June 1732, (jointly with Townsend, then Hughes)
- Captain Richard Hughes, 5 May 1729 – 12 February 1754, (jointly with Seymour)
- Captain Sir Richard Hughes, 12 February 1754 – 25 August 1773
- Commodore James Gambier, 25 August 1773 – 26 January 1778
- Captain Samuel Hood, 26 January 1778 – 30 September 1780
- Captain Henry Martin, 30 September 1780 – 13 March 1790
- Captain Sir Charles Saxton, 13 March 1790 – July 1806
- Captain Sir George Grey, July 1806 – January 1829
