= Castro fortress =

Fortification in Vigo, Spain, built in 1665

Fortress of O Castro
- Fortaleza do Castro; Fortaleza del Castro
- Vigo, Galicia in Spain
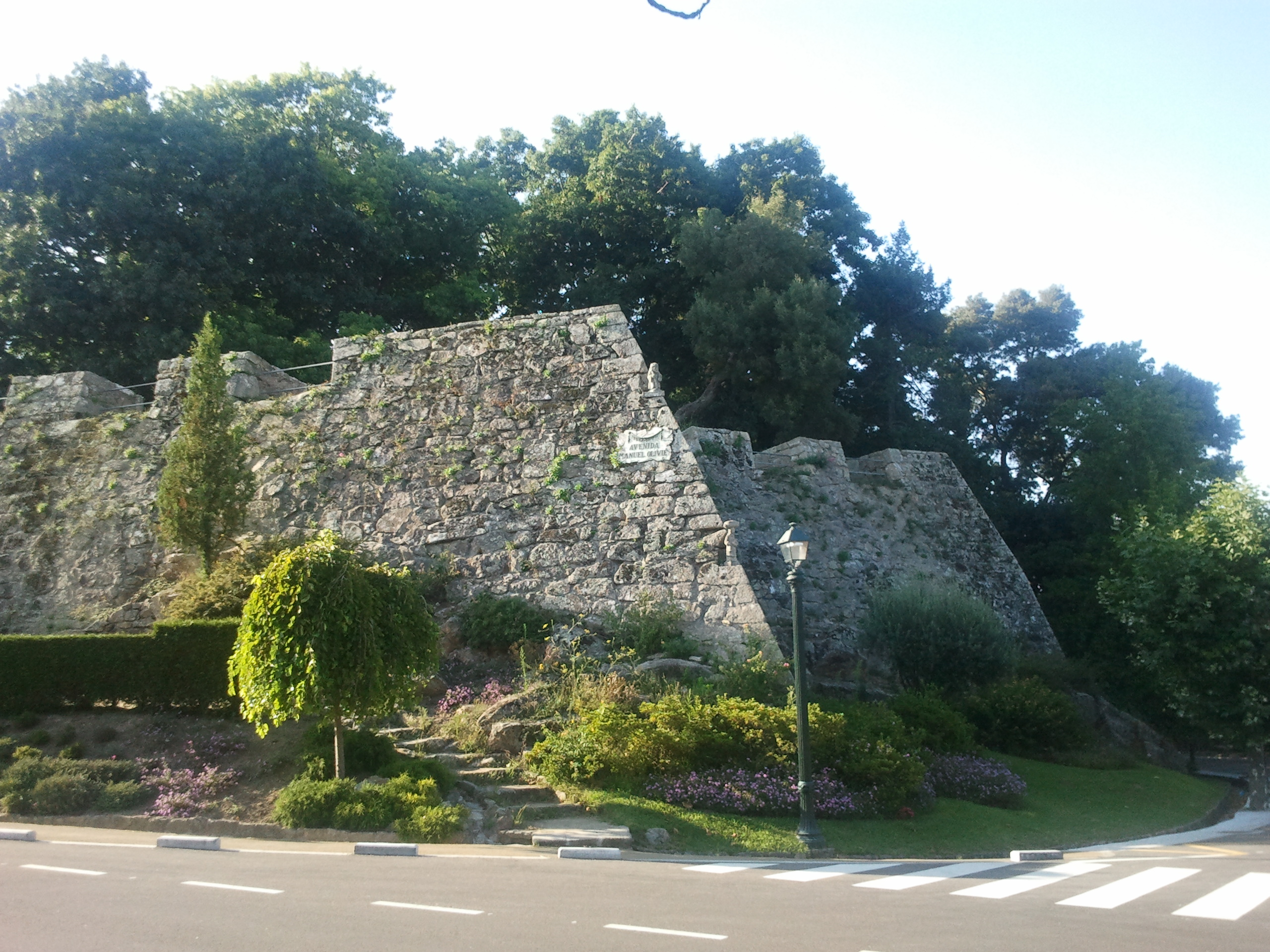
- One of the walls of Fortress

Site information
- Type: Fortification
- Owner: Concello de Vigo
- Open to the public: Yes

Location
- Location in Spain
- Coordinates: 42°13′55.90″N 8°43′38.78″W

Site history
- Built: 1665
- Built by: Engineer Colonel Fernando de Gourannanbergue
- Battles/wars: Battle of Vigo Bay, Peninsular War

The Fortress of O Castro is a fortification located in Vigo, Spain built in 1665 by the Spanish Empire in the province of Pontevedra during the Portuguese Restoration War to defend the region from potential attacks by English forces.

Built on a hill of the same name, the defensive system of Vigo consisted of the fortresses of O Castro and San Sebastián along with the city wall. The city wall had an irregular shape due to the orography of the city, and was constructed by two Spanish Army officers: Colonel Fernando de Gourannanbergue and Maestre de campo Diego Arias Taboada to link the two fortresses together. Despite this effort to provide security to the city, documents from that time say that this defensive system was ineffective as it could not impede landings further along the coast.

During the War of the Spanish Succession, the fortress saw action during the Battle of Vigo Bay on 23–24 October 1702, when a combined English Royal Navy and Dutch States Navy fleet attacked elements of the French and Spanish navies, defeating them. The fortress, along with the city of Vigo itself, were captured by British forces as part of the capture of Vigo and Pontevedra during the War of the Quadruple Alliance on 10 October 1719. In 1809, the fortress was occupied by the French Imperial Army during Peninsular War; on 28 March of that year, the fortress was reconquered by Spanish forces following an uprising by people of Vigo; as a result, the city was given the honorific title of "the faithful, loyal and courageous city of Vigo" the following year.

Nowadays the fortress is one of the preferred sites for people to take a walk in Vigo, because of its beautiful gardens, open spaces, fountain and also the privileged views.

== Gallery ==
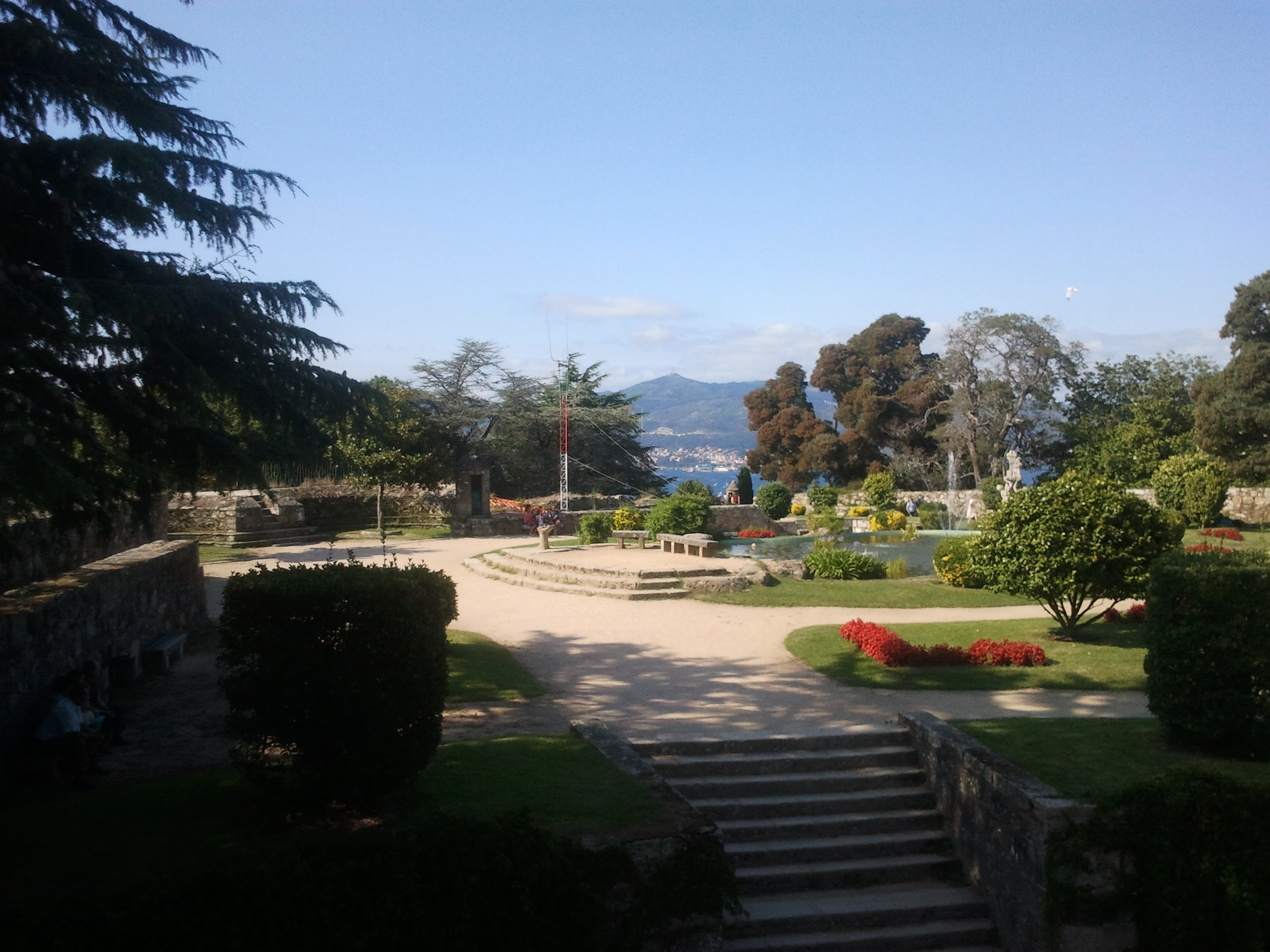
Part of the internal garden of the fortress

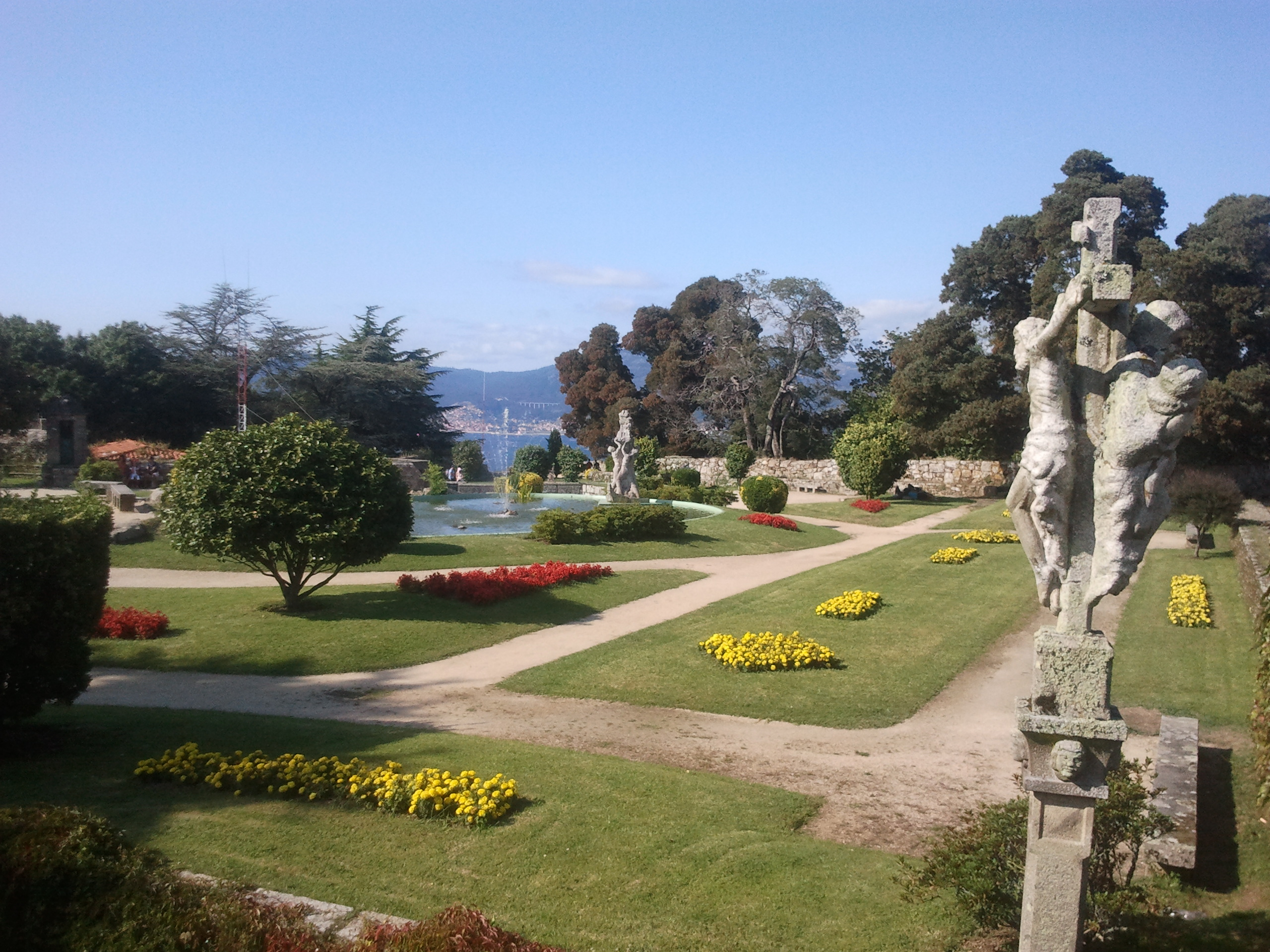
Part of the internal garden and "cruceiro" of the fortress

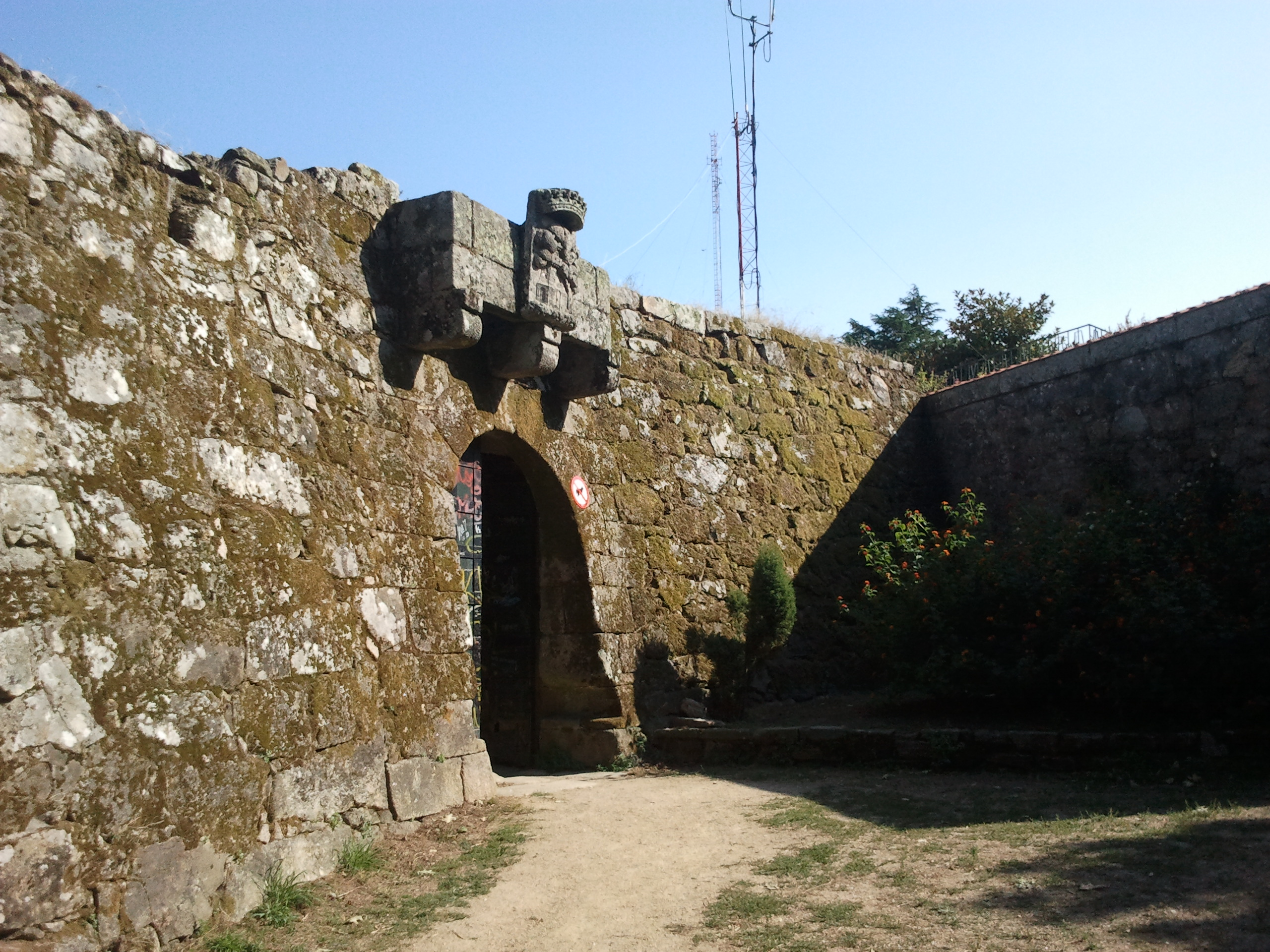
One of the entries of the second wall

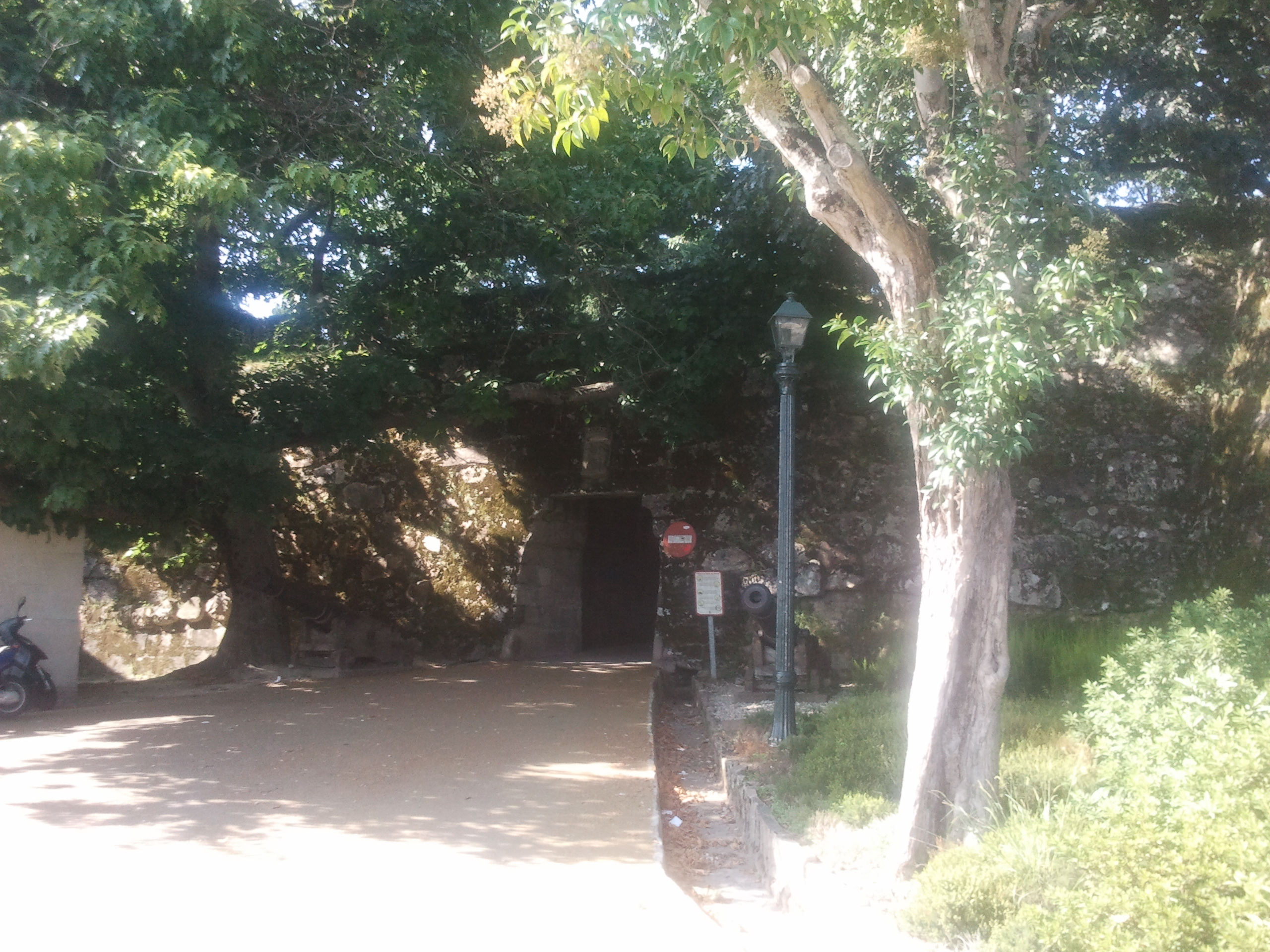
One of the entries of the first wall
