= HMS Siren (1745) =

History
- Name: HMS Siren
- Namesake: Siren
- Ordered: 27 August 1744
- Builder: Thomas Snelgrove, Limehouse
- Laid down: September 1744
- Launched: 3 September 1745
- Commissioned: November 1745
- Decommissioned: December 1763
- Fate: Sold, 26 January 1764

General characteristics
- Type: 20-gun sixth-rate (1741 Establishment)
- Tons burthen: 498 36/94 tons bm
- Length: 112 ft 2 in (34.19 m) (gundeck); 93 ft 3 in (28.42 m) (keel)
- Beam: 32 ft 1 in (9.78 m)
- Depth of hold: 11 ft (3.4 m)
- Complement: 140
- Armament: 20 × 6-pounder guns

HMS Siren (most often referred to as Syren in contemporary records) was a sixth-rate post ship of the British Royal Navy, in commission between 1745 and 1763, seeing action during the War of the Austrian Succession and the Seven Years' War.

== Ship history ==
Siren was built at Limehouse by Thomas Snelgrove at a cost of £4,606.10.0d, and completed fitting out at Deptford Dockyard on 16 November 1745 at a cost of £3,721.15.11d. The ship was then commissioned under the command of John Stringer and stationed in the Thames Approaches and the Downs.

In December 1746 Captain Stringer was removed from the ship, and the Hon. John Byron took command. Stringer was dismissed from the Navy by court martial in January 1747. Siren then served as part of Admiral George Anson's fleet in 1747.

Matthew King was appointed to her in October 1747, and in August 1748, she sailed for the East Indies. Captain King died there in June 1749, and command was assumed by William Mantell. Siren remained in the East Indies until 1751. She returned to England, and was paid off in July 1752 and surveyed. In July 1754 she commenced "middling repairs", completed at a cost of £5,457.10.3d, before she recommissioned under the command Charles Proby in October 1754. On 18 December she sailed as part of Admiral Augustus Keppel's North American squadron during the French and Indian War. She was stationed off South Carolina when finally ordered home in July 1756.

On 23 October 1756, under the command of Thomas Collingwood, she sailed for the Mediterranean Sea, where she was engaged in escorting English merchant shipping.

Small repairs were carried out at Sheerness Dockyard between August 1759 and January 1760.

Siren was commissioned in March 1761 under the command of Charles Douglas. After fitting out at Sheerness Dockyard was completed in May 1761, at a cost of £2661.3.3d, she served as part of the Downs Squadron. On 26 November 1761, Siren in company with Unicorn and the sloop Martin, chased and captured the 10-gun privateer cutter Ernestine of Dunkirk.

On 21 April 1762 Siren sailed for the Newfoundland Fishery. In September 1762 she took part in the recapture of St. John's as part of the squadron under the command of Commodore Alexander Colville.

In late 1762, command was assumed by William Paston. She was paid off in December 1763, and was sold at Sheerness for £1,015 on 26 January 1764.
