= HMS Ipswich =

Ship of the line of the Royal Navy

- Plans for the 1730 rebuild of Ipswich

History

Great Britain
- Name: HMS Ipswich
- Ordered: 1690
- Builder: Barret, Harwich
- Launched: 19 April 1694
- Fate: Broken up, 1764

General characteristics as built
- Class & type: 70-gun third-rate ship of the line
- Tons burthen: 1049
- Length: 149 ft 11 in (45.7 m) (gundeck)
- Beam: 40 ft (12.2 m)
- Depth of hold: 16 ft 8 in (5.1 m)
- Propulsion: Sails
- Sail plan: Full-rigged ship
- Armament: 70 guns of various weights of shot

General characteristics after 1730 rebuild
- Class & type: 1719 Establishment 70-gun third rate ship of the line
- Tons burthen: 1142
- Length: 151 ft (46.0 m) (gundeck)
- Beam: 41 ft 6 in (12.6 m)
- Depth of hold: 17 ft 4 in (5.3 m)
- Propulsion: Sails
- Sail plan: Full-rigged ship
- Armament: 70 guns: Gundeck: 26 × 24 pdrs; Upper gundeck: 26 × 12 pdrs; Quarterdeck: 14 × 6 pdrs; Forecastle: 4 × 6 pdrs

HMS Ipswich was a 70-gun third-rate ship of the line of the Royal Navy, launched at Harwich on 19 April 1694.

She was rebuilt by Joseph Allin the younger at Portsmouth according to the 1719 Establishment, relaunching on 30 October 1730. In 1743 she was part of a small three-vessel squadron sent to the Bay of Ajaccio under Vice-Admiral Thomas Mathews to investigate reports that a single Spanish ship of the line was anchored there for repairs. On reaching the Bay the squadron, comprising Ipswich, HMS Revenge and the fireship HMS Anne Galley, encountered and overwhelmed the 70-gun Spanish warship Isidoro. The Spanish vessel was set on fire by her crew to avoid her being captured, and sank in the bay.

Ipswich was hulked in 1757, and broken up in 1764.
