= HMS Blandford (1711) =

British warship

History

Great Britain
- Name: HMS Blandford
- Ordered: 24 January 1711
- Builder: Royal Dockyard, Woolwich
- Launched: 29 October 1711
- Commissioned: 1712
- Fate: Lost with all hands 23 March 1719

General characteristics
- Type: 24-gun Sixth Rate
- Tons burthen: 280 23/94 bm
- Length: 94 ft 0 in (28.7 m) gundeck; 76 ft 9 in (23.4 m) keel for tonnage
- Beam: 26 ft 0 in (7.9 m) for tonnage
- Depth of hold: 11 ft 7 in (3.5 m)
- Armament: 20 × 6-pdr 19 cwt guns on wooden trucks (UD); 4 × 4-pdr 12 cwt guns on wooden trucks (QD)

HMS Blandford was a member of the Gibraltar Group of 24-gun sixth rates. After commissioning she spent her career in Home Waters and the Baltic on trade protection duties. She was lost with all hands in a storm in the Bay of Biscay in March 1719.

Blandford was the first named vessel in the Royal Navy.

== Construction ==
She was ordered on 24 January 1711 from Woolwich Dockyard to be built under the guidance of Jacob Acworth, Master Shipwright of Woolwich. She was launched on 29 October 1711.

== Commissioned service ==
She was commissioned in 1712 under the command of Commander Mungo Herdman, RN (promoted to captain in January 1713) for service in the English Channel then on to the Baltic in 1713 with a deployment to the Mediterranean in 1714. She under the command of Captain Alesander Geddes, RN in 1715 then Captain Charles Boyle, RN in 1716 in the Baltic. She was underwent a small repair at Deptford from March to May 1716 at a cost of £1,173.19.11d. (Note: A total cost accounting for inflation of approximately £209,600 in today's money.) She was under the command of Captain Erasmus Phillips, RN for service in the English Channel and the North Sea in 1717.

== Disposition ==
HMS Blandford was lost with all hands during a storm in the Bay of Biscay on 23 March 1719.
