= Bazeley (surname) =

Bazeley is a surname, and may refer to:

- Darren Bazeley (born 1972), English football coach and former player
- Geoffrey Bazeley (1906–1989), British architect
- George Bazeley (born 1984), Australian field hockey goalkeeper
- Kate Bazeley (born 1984), Canadian road running athlete
- Percival Bazeley (1909–1991), Australian scientist

== See also ==
- Bazely (surname)
