= Richard Griffith (Royal Navy officer) =

British Royal Navy captain

Captain Richard Griffith
- Died: 7 August 1719
- Occupation: Royal Navy captain

Richard Griffith (died 7 August 1719) was a British Royal Navy captain.

== Biography ==
Griffith is said by Charnock to have been the son of Richard Griffith, a captain in the navy temp. Charles II. This is extremely doubtful; he seems to have been of humble origin, and of very imperfect education, scarcely able to write. In 1691 he was, it appears, commander of a small merchant ship, or pink, which was captured by a French privateer, and which he recaptured in the night with the aid of a boy; clapping on the hatches, it is said, and overpowering and throwing overboard the sleeping watch. For this exploit he was ordered by their majesties a gold chain and medal, and appointed captain of the Mary galley, 22 April 1692. The boy also received a medal (Griffith to Burchett, 14 June 1701; Admiralty Minute, 2 December 1692). At La Hogue the Mary galley was tender to the admiral, and ‘was sent the first express to the queen with the news of beating and burning the enemy's ships, for which,’ wrote Griffith nine years afterwards, ‘her majesty ordered me a royal bounty of 300l., which as yet I have not received.’ He was then employed in convoy service to Newfoundland and to Lisbon, in cruising on the coast of France for intelligence, and at the bombardment of St. Malo with Benbow, after which he was sent into the Mediterranean, and early in 1695, being then at Cagliari, was ordered by Russell to go to Messina, to take command of the Trident, a French ship of 54 guns, which, together with the Content, had lately been captured by an English squadron. After bringing the Trident to England, and some months spent in convoy service, Griffith, still in the Trident, was, early in 1697, ordered out to the West Indies in the squadron which joined Vice-admiral John Nevell at Barbadoes, and met. M. de Pointis off Cartagena on 28–9 May. According to Griffith's account the Trident was the only ship engaged; and she, being the weathermost ship, was for some time surrounded by the enemy and might have been taken, had they not been more intent on getting clearoff with the spoils of Cartagena. She was afterwards one of the squadron under Rear-admiral Meese which sacked Petit-Goave; was with Nevell off Havana, and accompanied him to Virginia, whence, after the vice-admiral's death, she returned to England. Early in the voyage the ship lost her rudder; she was very weak-handed, many of her men sick, and thus, one dark night in November, as she made the coast of Ireland, she struck on a rock, and was for some time in imminent danger. ‘Not knowing where we were,’ wrote Griffith, ‘and having no boat or any other ways of saving a man, I thought I could not do too much to save the king's ship and all our lives; and then, with my cane in one hand, and a case knife in the other, to cut down their hammocks, did rouse up as many men as I could, and with God's assistance got her off, and next day into Baltimore, and after to Spithead.’ There a complaint was laid against him for, among other things, not ‘carrying a due discipline in his majesty's ship, for beating the officers, and for running up and down the deck with a case knife in his hand,’ and, being tried on these charges, was found guilty and suspended during the pleasure of the admiralty. During the peace he took command of a merchant ship to the Mediterranean, and in the beginning of 1702, his suspension having been taken off, he was appointed to the Bridgwater, which he commanded on the coast of Ireland and in the Irish Sea for the next three years. During 1705 he was employed on impress service, and in the beginning of 1706 was appointed to the Swiftsure, in which, in company with the Warspite, he sailed from Plymouth on 19 February 1706–7, in charge of a convoy of thirty-three merchant ships bound for Lisbon. On 22 February they fell in with a squadron of seventeen French ships of war, many of them large; and Griffith, after consulting his officers, decided that it was hopeless to resist such an enormous superiority of force. The convoy crowded sail and made off before the wind, scattering as they went. Many of the merchant ships were captured, but the rest and the two men-of-war got safely to Lisbon. It is stated by Charnock that Griffith's conduct on this occasion was inquired into by a court-martial held at Lisbon. There is no official record of any such court-martial; and probably an explanation to the admiral, Sir George Byng, was all that was called for. In any case, he was held free from blame; and, in the Swiftsure, went on to Gibraltar, and thence into the Mediterranean, where he joined the fleet under Sir Clowdisley Shovell, and took part in the operations at Toulon; returning to England in October, when the Association and other ships of the fleet were lost among the Scilly Islands (Swiftsure's Log). During the winter Griffith had temporarily command of the Essex, cruising in the Channel with Sir John Leake, but in February resumed the command of the Swiftsure, in which he was stationed as senior officer in the Downs. On 25 March 1708, being off Dunkirk with a squadron of four ships of the line, they sighted an enemy's squadron of fourteen sail, one with an admiral's flag at the main. ‘They drew into line of battle, and by reason of their number and strength, we kept our wind, and in the night lost sight of them’ (Griffith to Burchett, 26 March). The next day the squadron returned to the Downs in order to report the affair to the prince; but some weeks after, in consequence of a letter which was published in the ‘Gazette’ (25-9 April), Griffith was ordered to be tried by court-martial. He was tried accordingly on 10 May, and, on a full examination into the circumstances, was acquitted, ‘the matter of fact contained in the letter’ being pronounced ‘false and groundless’ (Minutes of the Court-Martial). Griffith continued in the Swiftsure till July, when he was appointed to the Captain, in which, the following April, he took out a convoy to Lisbon, and went thence to the Mediterranean with Sir John Jennings.

On his return to England in the summer of 1710 he was appointed to the Boyne, which he commanded on the home station and in the Mediterranean for the next three years. He had no further service, and died on 7 Aug. 1719. Nothing is known of his family.
