= John Bazely =

Royal Navy Admiral (1740–1809)

Admiral John Bazely
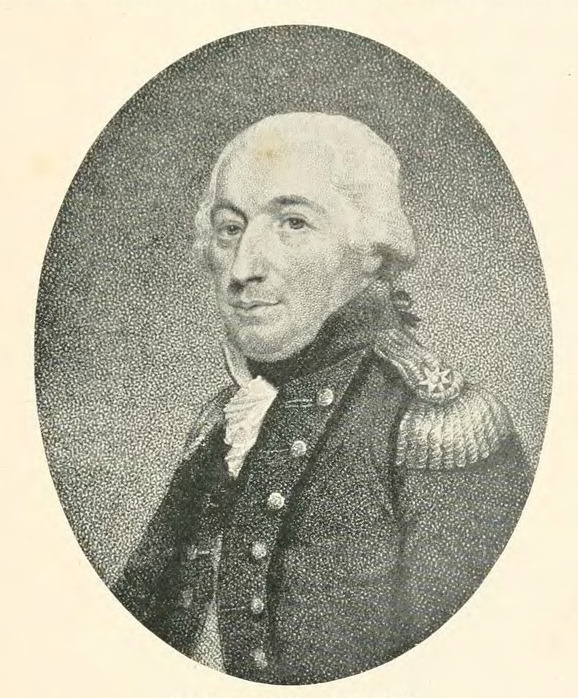
- Born: March 1740; Dover, Kent
- Died: 22 April 1809 (aged 69); Edinburgh, Scotland
- Military career
- Allegiance: Kingdom of Great Britain
- Branch: Royal Navy
- Service years: 1755–1796
- Rank: Royal Navy Admiral
- Conflicts: Seven Years' War; American Revolutionary War; Capture of USS Lexington; First Battle of Ushant; Capture of the Cape Finisterre convoy; Battle of Cape St Vincent; Battle of Martinique; Battle of Groton Heights; French Revolutionary Wars; Glorious First of June; Battle of Hyères

Admiral John Bazely (March 1740 – 22 April 1809) was an experienced and highly respected officer of the British Royal Navy who served in three wars and saw numerous actions, notably during the American War of Independence. He first gained notice with the capture of the American brig USS Lexington in 1777, following which he was rapidly promoted and by 1779 was a post captain and fought in engagements under Augustus Keppel and George Rodney with some success. He later served in the Channel Fleet under Lord Howe and fought at the Glorious First of June, although his career stagnated during the French Revolutionary Wars and he was unemployed for the final decade of his life, despite his being "regarded with respect and gratitude by his compatriots at large".

== Early career ==
Bazely was born in Dover to a "respectable family", and after completing his education, joined the Royal Navy in 1755 at the age of 15. his first ship was HMS Ambuscade under the command of Joshua Rowley, in which he saw the outbreak of the Seven Years' War. In January 1756, Bazely transferred to HMS Hampshire, under the command of Captain Edward Hughes. Remaining with Hughes throughout various commissions, Bazely was promoted to lieutenant in 1760 and in 1777, with the outbreak of the American War of Independence, was given his own command: the small cutter HMS Alert.

== American War of Independence ==
Bazely's first action was off Ushant on 22 September 1777, when the 10-gun Alert sighted and engaged the becalmed 16-gun American ship USS Lexington. A three-hour duel from 07:00 to 10:00, seriously damaged both ships. The American vessel attempted to escape to the south but Bazely gave chase and caught his opponent at 13:00. By 13:30 he had forced Lexington to surrender; she had suffered seven killed and 11 wounded to Alert's two dead and three wounded. A prize crew then sailed Lexington to Britain. Bazely was lauded and immediately promoted to commander, making the jump to post captain in April 1778 and taking command of the new second-rate HMS Formidable as flag captain to Admiral Sir Hugh Palliser.

Formidable was in action soon after Bazely took command, at the First Battle of Ushant. Bazely was heavily engaged, and Formidable suffered 16 killed and 49 wounded in the battle. The aftermath of the engagement was characterised by bad feelings between Palliser and Augustus Keppel, who each blamed the other for the failure to defeat the French squadron. Both demanded courts-martial to determine their measure of responsibility, and Bazely notoriously failed to back up Palliser when called to give evidence at Keppel's trial. As a result, Bazely was hastily given command of the frigate HMS Pegasus in order that he should not be available to appear at Palliser's court martial. Both admirals were controversially acquitted of any wrongdoing, but the enmity bred from this dispute lasted years.

Pegasus was attached to George Rodney's fleet for the relief of the Great Siege of Gibraltar, and was present at both of Rodney's actions in the campaign to relieve the fortress, participating in the seizure of a Spanish armaments convoy off Cape Finisterre on 8 January 1780 and subsequently fighting at the Battle of Cape St Vincent eight days later, where a Spanish attempt to intercept the British fleet was destroyed. Pegasus accompanied Rodney to Gibraltar and was subsequently involved in the inconclusive Battle of Martinique in the West Indies. Bazely carried the dispatches of the battle back to Britain and was soon given command of HMS Apollo and then HMS Amphion.

In Amphion, Bazely served off the Eastern Seaboard of North America, supporting British troops at the Battle of Groton Heights and overseeing the burning of New London, Connecticut and the military stores within the town. At the end of the war, Bazely remained in service, commanding HMS Alfred at Chatham during the ten years of peace.

== French Revolutionary Wars ==
Bazely returned to active service in 1793 at the outbreak of the French Revolutionary War. Operating with the Channel Fleet under Lord Howe, Alfred was engaged in the Atlantic campaign of May 1794 and fought at the Glorious First of June. For unknown reasons, Bazely failed to follow Lord Howe's battle plans and was thus not heavily engaged in the action, his ship suffering only eight men wounded. As a result, Bazely was among those captains omitted from the list of captains awarded the commemorative medal for the battle, omissions which caused severe divisions in the Navy.

In February 1795, Bazely was appointed to HMS Blenheim, which he took to the Mediterranean to serve under Lord Hotham. Blenheim fought at the Battle of Hyères shortly after its arrival in the Mediterranean, but was not closely engaged. On 1 June 1795, Bazely was promoted to rear-admiral and briefly held temporary commands at the Downs and the Nore stations before being placed in retirement by 1797. Bazely never again served on active duty, retiring to Edinburgh and gradually advancing as a retired admiral until he reached the rank of full admiral shortly before his death in April 1809.

== Family ==
He had two sons, John Bazely, Jr. (who later became an admiral himself) and Rev. Thomas Tyssen Bazely, father of Rev. Henry Bazely of Oxford.

== Notes ==
Military offices
| Preceded by Joseph Peyton | Commander-in-Chief, The Downs (Acting); 1796–1797 | Succeeded by Skeffington Lutwidge |
