= Richard Haddock (Royal Navy officer, born 1673) =

Royal Navy officer (1673–1751)

Captain Richard Haddock
- Born: 1673
- Died: 1751 (aged 77–78)
- Military career
- Allegiance: Kingdom of Great Britain
- Branch: Royal Navy
- Rank: Captain
- Commands: HMS Resolution

Captain Richard Haddock (1673–1751) was a Royal Navy officer who became Comptroller of the Navy.

== Naval career ==
Born the son of Admiral Sir Richard Haddock, Haddock Junior was given command of HMS Resolution in 1708. He became Comptroller of the Navy in 1734. He inherited from his father a house at Mile End and a property in Soham in Cambridgeshire.

Military offices
Preceded by James Mighells	Comptroller of the Navy; 1734–1749	Succeeded by Savage Mostyn
