= John Evans (Royal Navy officer) =

Royal Navy Admiral (1717–1794)

Admiral John Evans
- Born: 1717
- Died: 8 July 1794 (aged 76–77); Feltham, Middlesex
- Military career
- Allegiance: United Kingdom
- Branch: Royal Navy
- Rank: Admiral
- Commands: HMS Flamborough; HMS Squirrel; HMS Glasgow; HMS Experiment; HMS Prince Edward; HMS Preston; HMS Augusta; The Downs

Admiral John Evans (1717 – 8 July 1794) was a Royal Navy officer.

== Naval career ==
Evans joined the Royal Navy in 1731. Promoted to captain on 20 April 1748, he was given command of the post ship HMS Flamborough on promotion, the sixth-rate HMS Squirrel later in the year and the sixth-rate HMS Glasgow later still in the year. He went on to take command of the sixth-rate HMS Experiment in December 1753, the fifth-rate HMS Prince Edward in July 1755 and the fourth-rate HMS Preston in January 1757 as well as the third-rate HMS Augusta in 1767. He was promoted to commodore in 1778. Promoted to rear-admiral on 29 March 1779 and to vice-admiral on 26 September 1780, he became acting commander-in-chief the Downs in 1780 before being promoted to full admiral on 1 February 1793.

Military offices
Preceded by Francis Drake	Commander-in-Chief, The Downs (Acting); 1780–1781	Succeeded by Sir Richard Hughes (Acting)
