= Henry Bazely =

Minister of the church of Scotland

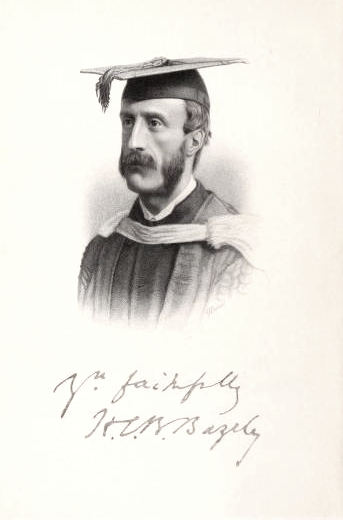
Henry Bazely

Henry Casson Barnes Bazely (1842–1883) was an English minister of the Church of Scotland, active in Oxford and London.

== Early life ==
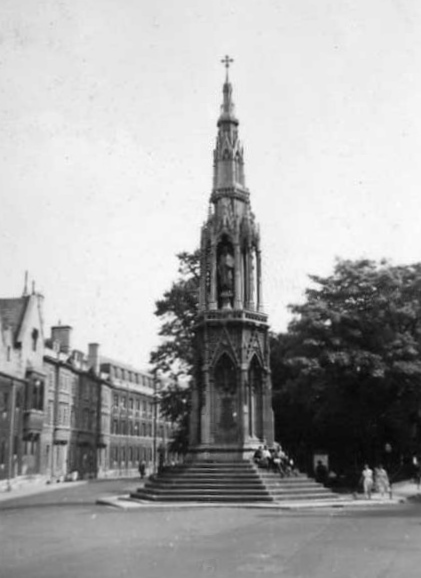
The Martyrs' Memorial in Oxford 1956

He was born on 4 September 1842, the elder son of Rev. Thomas Tyssen Bazely, rector of All Saints Church in Poplar, London, and his wife Julia Shipdem. His paternal grandfather was Admiral John Bazely. On his father's retirement (sometime before 1861), the family moved to 1 James Villas, Poonah Place, Tunbridge Wells.

Bazely was educated at Radley College under William Sewell. He matriculated at Brasenose College, Oxford in 1861, graduating BA in 1865 and BCL in 1868. While at Oxford he befriended Rev. David Johnston of Unst. They travelled together to Scotland, and Johnston explained Scottish Presbyterianism. Bazely went on to join the Church of Scotland, in 1868.

== Preacher and minister ==
In 1869 Bazely was licensed to preach by the Presbytery of Edinburgh. On his return to Oxford he then began preaching in the open, especially to the poor, and selling his possessions. His favourite preaching location was the Martyrs' Memorial, Oxford.

In 1871 Bazeley hired a meeting hall on Alfred Street in Oxford (at his own expense) where he began preaching in the Church of Scotland format. In April 1877 he was ordained as a Church of Scotland minister, at Stepney in London.

Bazely's mother Julia (1806–1876) was the youngest daughter of John Shipdem of the Round House, Dover, and his wife Francis Walker. On her death, he received an inheritance; he used it and some of his own money to finance the first Church of Scotland Church in Oxford, completed in 1879. He built it on a site on Nelson Street.

Bazely preached to race meetings at both Abingdon-on-Thames and Ascot. He preached each evening at the Martyrs' Memorial.

In 1881 Bazely was living with his wife at 32 New Inn Hall Street in Oxford.

== Death and legacy ==
Bazely died of Bright's disease at home in Oxford on 1 March 1883. He is buried in St Sepulchre Cemetery in Oxford. A memoir by Edward Hicks was published in 1886.

After Bazely's death there was a dispute between the Church of Scotland and his widow as to the ownership of the church on Nelson Street. The Church offered no compensation and Mrs Bazely was in dire need of funds and could not give the building away. As such, the Church of Scotland abandoned its presence in Oxford in 1885.

== Family ==
On 6 August 1880, at the Crown Court Church, Covent Garden, in London, Bazely married Louisa Boothby, daughter of George William Boothby (1819–1868), a naval officer, and his wife Harriet Glass, daughter of Edward Binny Glass of the Madras Civil Service and his wife Catherine Corse Scott, daughter of John Corse Scott. The couple had one son, George Henry Boothby Bazely (1881–1954).
