= French ship Fougueux (1747) =

Ship of the line of the French Navy

History

France
- Name: Fougueux
- Builder: Brest
- Laid down: January 1745
- Launched: March 1747
- Commissioned: July 1747
- Fate: Captured 1747

Great Britain
- Name: Fougueux
- Acquired: 14 October 1747
- Fate: Broken up 21 May 1759

General characteristics in French service
- Class & type: Lys-class third-rate ship of the line
- Displacement: 2100 tonneaux
- Tons burthen: 1100 port tonneaux
- Length: 48.4 m (158 ft 10 in)
- Beam: 13.0 m (42 ft 8 in)
- Draught: 6.2 m (20 ft 4 in)
- Crew: 466
- Armament: 64

General characteristics in British service where different
- Tons burthen: 1,400 tons
- Length: 51.6 m (169 ft 3 in)
- Beam: 14.3 m (46 ft 11 in)
- Draught: 5.9 m (19 ft 4 in)
- Crew: 520

Fougueux was a Lys-class third-rate ship of the line of the French Royal Navy, designed by Jacques-Luc Coulomb.

Fougueux was captured by the Royal Navy in 1747 during the Second Battle of Cape Finisterre. After this, the ship was commissioned into the Royal Navy under the name HMS Fougueux. In 1758 it was used in the expedition against Île de Gorée.
