= HMS Resolution (1708) =

Ship of the line of the Royal Navy

History

Great Britain
- Name: HMS Resolution
- Builder: Allin, Deptford Dockyard
- Launched: 25 March 1708
- Fate: Wrecked, 1711

General characteristics
- Class & type: 1706 Establishment 70-gun third rate ship of the line
- Tons burthen: 1,118
- Length: 150 ft (45.7 m) (gundeck)
- Beam: 41 ft (12.5 m)
- Depth of hold: 17 ft 4 in (5.3 m)
- Propulsion: Sails
- Sail plan: Full-rigged ship
- Armament: 70 guns: Gundeck: 26 × 24-pdrs; Upper gundeck: 26 × 12-pdrs; Quarterdeck: 14 × 6-pdrs; Forecastle: 4 × 6-pdrs

HMS Resolution was a 70-gun third rate ship of the line of the Royal Navy, built by Joseph Allin the elder (in accordance with the 1706 Establishment) at Deptford Dockyard, and launched on 25 March 1708.

Resolution was wrecked in 1711.
