= HMS Revenge (1699) =

Ship of the line of the Royal Navy

History

Great Britain
- Name: HMS Revenge
- Ordered: 1695
- Builder: Miller, Deptford Dockyard
- Launched: 1699
- Renamed: HMS Buckingham, 1711
- Fate: Sunk as foundation, 1745

General characteristics
- Class & type: 70-gun third rate ship of the line
- Tons burthen: 1065
- Length: 150 ft 2 in (45.8 m) (gundeck)
- Beam: 40 ft 3 in (12.3 m)
- Depth of hold: 17 ft 1.5 in (5.2 m)
- Propulsion: Sails
- Sail plan: Full-rigged ship
- Armament: 70 guns of various weights of shot

HMS Revenge was a 70-gun third rate ship of the line of the Royal Navy, launched at Deptford Dockyard in 1699.

She was renamed HMS Buckingham in 1711, and hulked in 1727. Buckingham continued to serve in this role until 1745, when she was sunk to form part of the foundation of a breakwater.
