= St Mary's Church, Patshull =

Coordinates: 52.6034°N 2.2958°W

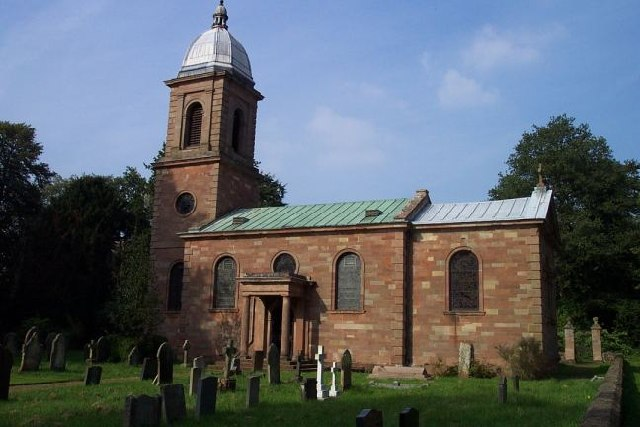
- St Mary's Church, Patshull, from the south

- Location in Staffordshire
- OS grid reference: SJ 800 006
- Location: Near Pattingham, Staffordshire
- Country: England
- Denomination: Anglican
- Website: Churches Conservation Trust

Architecture
- Functional status: Redundant
- Heritage designation: Grade II*
- Designated: 27 June 1963
- Architect(s): James Gibbs, W. C. Banks
- Architectural type: Church
- Style: Georgian
- Completed: 1874

Specifications
- Materials: Sandstone, lead roofs

St Mary's Church, Patshull, is a redundant Anglican church in the parish of Pattingham and Patshull, Staffordshire, England, and is situated near Patshull Hall. It is recorded in the National Heritage List for England as a designated Grade II* listed building, and is under the care of the Churches Conservation Trust. The church stands in parkland beside a lake.

== History ==
St Mary's was built in about 1743, and was designed by James Gibbs for Sir John Astley. It replaced an earlier medieval church on the site. Additions were made to it in 1874 by W. C. Banks. These included a north aisle, a bell tower, and a dome.

== Architecture ==
=== Exterior ===
The church is constructed in sandstone, with lead roofs. Its plan consists of a three-bay nave with a north aisle, a single-bay chancel with a north vestry, and a west tower. At the corners of the church and the tower are rusticated quoins. The tower is in three stages, the lower and middle stages being separated by a string course, and between the middle and top stages is a cornice. It contains round-headed and circular windows, and in the top stage are round-headed louvred bell openings flanked by Tuscan pilasters. It is surmounted by a lead cupola. At the east end of the church is a Venetian window, above which is a pedimented gable. Along the sides of the church are round-headed windows and, in the nave between these, are circular windows. In the middle of the south side is a porch supported by Tuscan pillars.

=== Interior ===
Between the nave and the north aisle is an arcade of round arches supported on square piers. The font consists of a marble baluster. Between the nave and chancel is a gilded wrought iron screen added by Banks. In the church are memorials to members of the Astley family. These include one to an earlier Sir John Astley who died in 1532. It is in alabaster and consists of two recumbent figures on a chest tomb. Another is to Sir Richard Astley who died in 1687. This consists of a standing figure between two seated wives, and is joined to the other monument by a frieze. Another monument is to a Lord Pigot who died in 1795 and to Sir Robert Pigot, 2nd Baronet who died the following year. Against the south wall of the nave is a medieval coffin lid.

== External features ==
Around the church are three structures, each of which has been listed at Grade II. These consist of the walls, gates and gate piers to the northeast and south of the churchyard, a gate, gate piers and adjoining walls to the east of the churchyard, and gate piers and gates to the northeast of the chancel. The churchyard contains the war graves of two soldiers of World War I.

== See also ==
- Grade II* listed buildings in South Staffordshire
- Listed buildings in Pattingham and Patshull
- List of churches preserved by the Churches Conservation Trust in the English Midlands
