= Robert Pigot (disambiguation) =

Sir Robert Pigot, 2nd Baronet (1720–1796) was a British Army officer.

Robert Pigot may also refer to:

- Sir Robert Pigot, 4th Baronet (1801–1891), British politician, MP for Bridgnorth
- Sir Robert Pigot, 6th Baronet (1882–1977), British Army and later Royal Air Force officer
- Sir Robert Pigot, 7th Baronet (1915–1986), British soldier

== See also ==
- Robert Pigott (disambiguation)
