= General Pigot =

General Pigot may refer to:

- Sir George Pigot, 3rd Baronet (1766–1840), British Army brevet major general
- Henry Pigot (1750–1840), British Army general
- Sir Robert Pigot, 2nd Baronet (1720–1796), British Army lieutenant general

== See also ==
- Anthony Pigott (1944–2020), British Army lieutenant general
