= Burnhill Green =

Hamlet in Staffordshire, England

Coordinates: 52.603°N 2.315°W

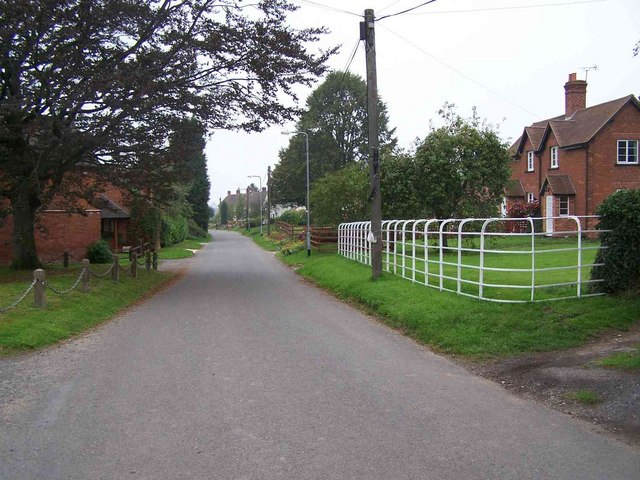

Burnhill Green is a small hamlet near Pattingham, situated in Staffordshire, England, in the former parish of Patshull. The hamlet is on the edge of the Staffordshire county border where it becomes Shropshire and consists of a pub, The Dartmouth Arms, surrounded by a few pre-1950 houses although The Crown Estate who own much of the land built some sustainable houses in 2010.

The hamlet forms part of the then country estate of the Earl's of Dartmouth made up of Patshull Hall and Patshull Park. Patshull Hall went through several incarnations ending up today as a number of privately owned apartments and cottages.

The hamlet is 2.5 miles (4 km) west of Pattingham and just 1.9 miles (3 km) south of the A464 road.

== See also ==
- Listed buildings in Pattingham and Patshull
