= 130th Regiment =

130th Regiment may refer to:

- 130th Aviation Regiment, United States
- 130th Baluchis, British Indian Army
- 130th Field Artillery Regiment, United States
- 130th Infantry Regiment (United States)
- 130th Infantry Regiment "Perugia", Italy
- 130th Regiment of Foot, a disestablished unit of the British Army (1794-96)
- 130th (Lowland) Field Regiment, Royal Artillery
- 130th (Queen's Edinburgh, Royal Scots) Light Anti-Aircraft Regiment, Royal Artillery

== American Civil War regiments ==
- 130th Illinois Infantry Regiment
- 130th Indiana Infantry Regiment
- 130th New York Infantry Regiment
- 130th Ohio Infantry Regiment
- 130th Pennsylvania Infantry Regiment

== See also ==
- 130th (disambiguation)
