= George Pigot, 1st Baron Pigot =

President of the British East India Company

The Right Honourable The Lord Pigot
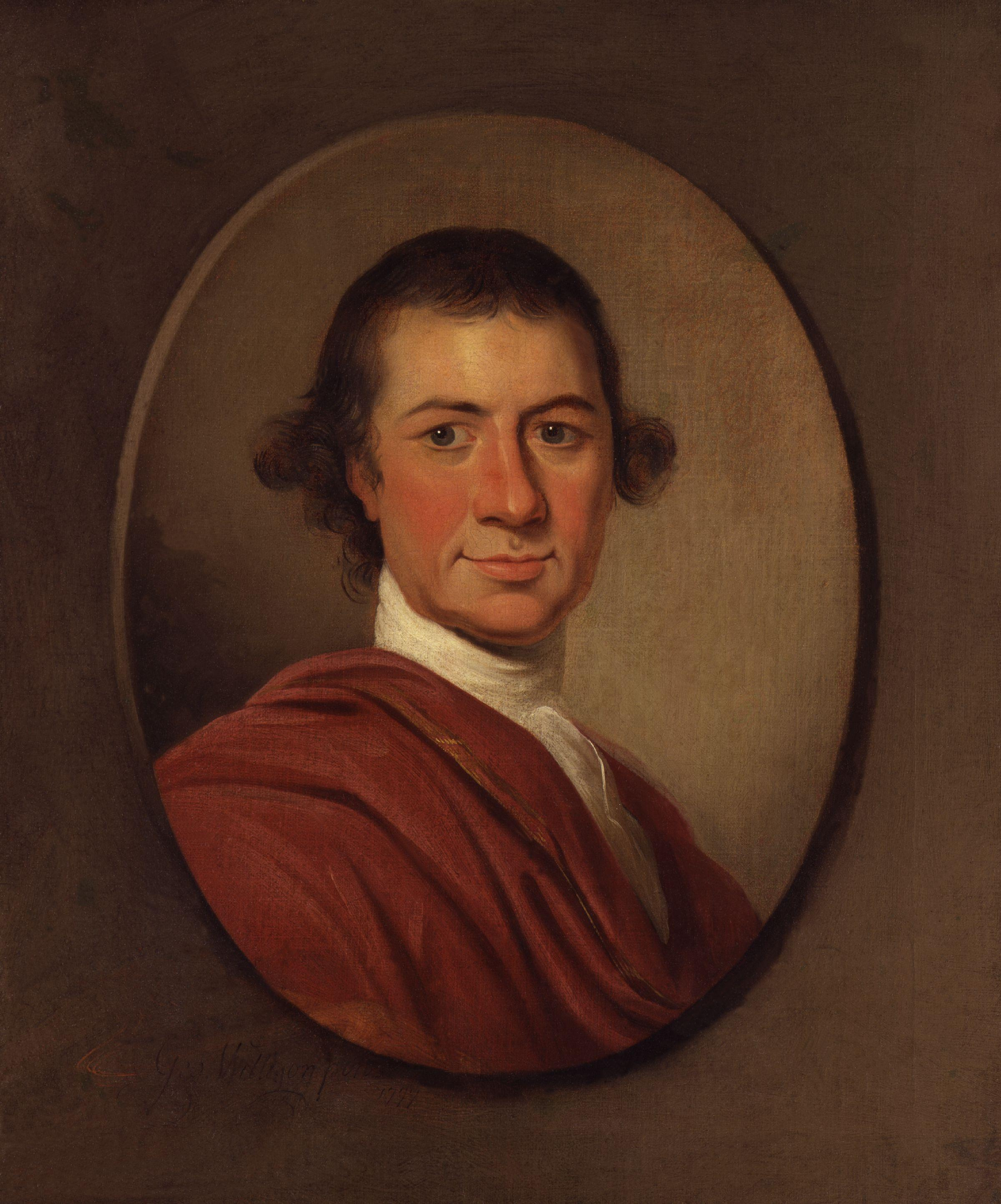
- Portrait by George Willison, 1777

President of the British East India Company
- In office 14 January 1755 – 14 November 1763
- Preceded by: Thomas Saunders
- Succeeded by: Robert Palk
- In office 11 December 1775 – 23 August 1776
- Preceded by: Alexander Wynch
- Succeeded by: George Stratton

Personal details
- Born: 4 May 1719 London, Great Britain
- Died: 11 May 1777 (aged 58) Madras

George Pigot, 1st Baron Pigot (4 May 1719 – 11 May 1777) was twice the British President of the British East India Company.

== Life ==
Pigot was born in London, most likley at King's Mews, Westminster. He was the eldest surviving son of Richard Pigot and his wife Frances, daughter of Peter Godde, a Huguenot who had immigrated to England in the late seventeenth century. Richard Pigot was clerk of the stables to the prince of Wales, while Frances was a dressmaker to Queen Caroline. George Pigot's brothers, Hugh and Robert, went on to have successful careers in the army and navy, respectively.

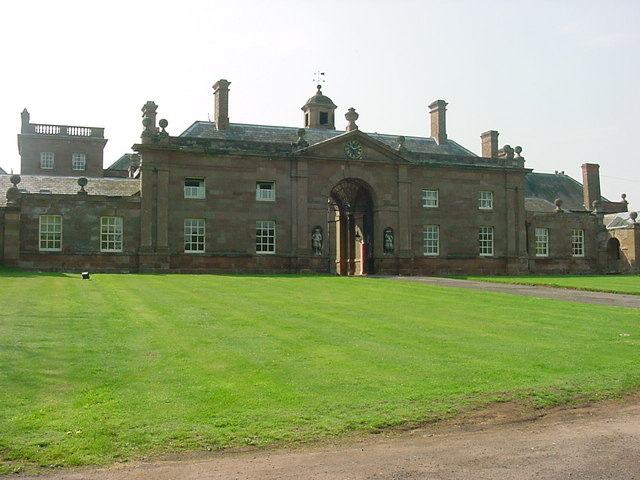
Triumphal entrance to Patshull Hall

Pigot entered the service of the East India Company in 1736, at the age of seventeen; after nineteen years he became governor and commander-in-chief of Madras in 1755. Having defended the city against the French in 1758–1759 and occupied Pondicherry on behalf of the company, he resigned his office in November 1763 and returned to the Kingdom of Great Britain, being made a baronet in 1764. After selling the family seat of Peplow Hall, Shropshire, he purchased Patshull Hall, Staffordshire, in 1765 for £100,000. That year he obtained the seat of Wallingford in the Parliament of Great Britain, which he retained until 1768. In 1766 he was created an Irish peer as Baron Pigot, of Patshull in the County of Dublin. From 1768 until his death he sat in the British House of Commons for Bridgnorth. Pigot was created an LL.D. of the University of Cambridge on 3 July 1769.

Returning to India in 1775 to reoccupy his former position at Madras, Pigot was at once involved in a fierce quarrel with the majority of his council which arose out of the proposed restoration of Thuljaji, the Rajah of Tanjore. The governor was arrested by order of his opponents and was still a prisoner when he died.

Meanwhile, the conduct of Pigot was censured by the court of directors in Great Britain, and the order for his restoration was followed immediately by another for his recall. This happened about a month after his death, but before the news had reached Great Britain. In 1779 the matter was discussed in Parliament, and four of those who were responsible for his arrest were tried and were fined £1000 each. Pigot, who left several illegitimate children, was never married, and his barony became extinct.

=== Service in the British East India Company ===
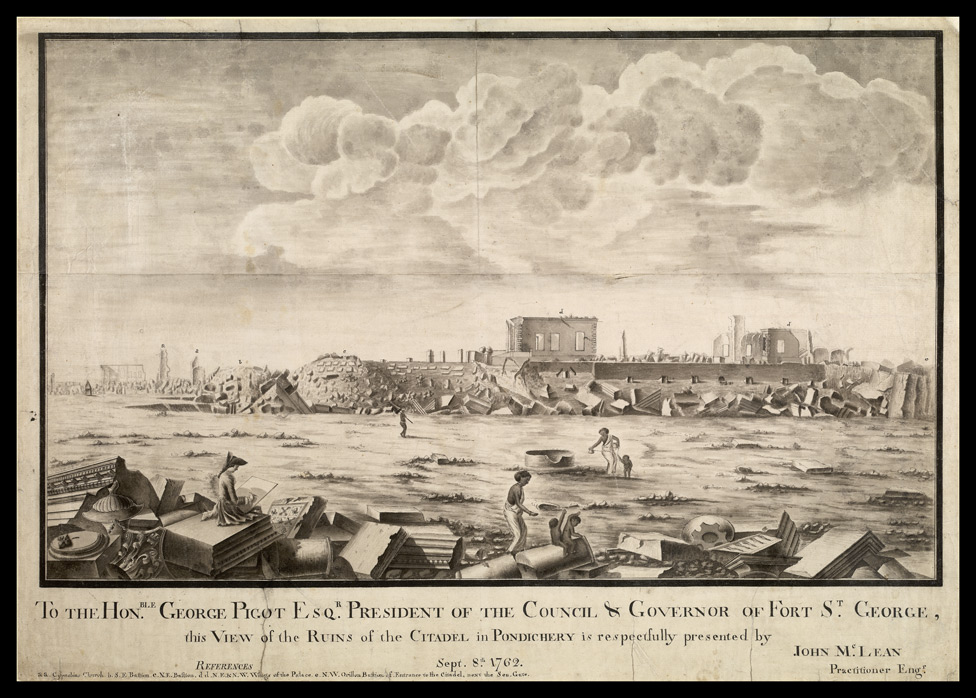
Pondicherry after the Siege of Pondicherry, with the demolished citadel in view.

George entered the service of the British East India Company in 1736 as a writer, and arrived at Madras on 26 July 1737. When a member of council at Fort St. David, Pigot was sent with Robert Clive to Trichinopoly in charge of some recruits and stores. On their return with a small escort of sepoys, they were attacked by a large body of polygars, and narrowly escaped with their lives. Pigot succeeded Thomas Saunders as governor and commander-in-chief of Madras on 14 January 1755. He conducted the defence of the city, when besieged by Thomas-Arthur de Lally in the winter of 1758–9, with considerable skill and spirit. On the capture of Pondicherry by Lieutenant-colonel Eyre Coote (1726–1783) in January 1761, Pigot demanded that it should be given up to the presidency of Madras as the property of the East India Company. This Coote refused after consulting his chief officers, who were of opinion that the place ought to be held for the Crown. Pigot thereupon declared that unless his demand was complied with, he would not furnish any money for the subsistence of the King's troops or the French prisoners. Upon this, Coote gave way, and Pigot took possession of Pondichéry, and destroyed all the fortifications in obedience to the orders previously received from England. Pigot resigned office on 14 November 1763, and forthwith returned to England. He was created a baronet on 5 December 1764, with remainder in default of male issue to his brothers Robert and Hugh, and their heirs male. He represented Wallingford in the British House of Commons from January 1765 to the dissolution in March 1768. At the general election in March 1768, he was returned for Bridgnorth, and continued to sit for that borough until his death. On 18 January 1766, he was created an Irish peer with the title of Baron Pigot, of Patshull in the County of Dublin.

=== Controversy and restoration ===
In April 1775, Pigot was appointed governor and commander-in-chief of Madras in the place of Alexander Wynch. He resumed office at Fort St. George on 11 December 1775, and soon found himself at variance with some of his council. In accordance with the instructions of the directors he proceeded to Tanjore, where he issued a proclamation on 11 April 1776 announcing the restoration of the Raja, whose territory had been seized and transferred to Muhammed Ali Khan Wallajah, Nawab of the Carnatic in spite of the treaty which had been made during Pigot's previous tenure of office. Upon Pigot's return from Tanjore the differences in the council became more accentuated. Paul Benfield had already asserted that he held assignments on the revenues of Tanjore for sums of vast amount lent by him to the Nawab, as well as assignments on the growing crops in Tanjore for large sums lent by him to other persons. He now pleaded that his interests ought not to be affected by the reinstatement of the raja, and demanded the assistance of the council in recovering his property. Pigot refused to admit the validity of these claims, but his opinion was disregarded by the majority of the council, and his customary right to precedence in the conduct of business was denied. The final struggle between the governor and his council was on a comparatively small point—whether his nominee, Mr. Russell, or Colonel Stuart, the nominee of the majority, should have the opportunity of placing the administration of Tanjore in the hands of the Raja. In spite of Pigot's refusal to allow the question of Colonel Stuart's instructions to be discussed by the council, the majority gave their approval to them, and agreed to a draft letter addressed to the officer at Tanjore, directing him to deliver over the command to Colonel Stuart. Pigot thereupon declined to sign either the instructions or the letter, and declared that without his signature the documents could have no legal effect. At a meeting of the council on 22 August 1776, a resolution was carried by the majority denying that the concurrence of the governor was necessary to constitute an act of government. It was also determined that, as Pigot would not sign either of the documents, a letter should be written to the secretary authorizing him to sign them in the name of the council. When this letter had been signed by George Stratton and Henry Brooke, Pigot snatched it away and formally charged them with an act subversive of the authority of the government. By the standing orders of the company, no member against whom a charge was preferred was allowed to deliberate or vote on any question relating to the charge. Through this ingenious manœuvre, Pigot obtained a majority in the council by his own casting vote, and the two offending members were subsequently suspended. On 23 August, the refractory members, instead of attending the council meeting, sent a notary public with a protest in which they denounced Pigot's action on the previous day, and declared themselves to be the "only legal representatives of the Honourable Company under this presidency". This protest was also sent by them to the commanders of the king's troops, and to all persons holding any authority in Madras. Enraged at this insult, Pigot summoned a second council meeting on the same day, at which Messrs. Floyer, Palmer, Jerdan, and Mackay, who had joined Messrs. Stratton and Brooke and the commanding officer, Sir Robert Fletcher, in signing the protest, were suspended, and orders were at the same time given for the arrest of Sir Robert Fletcher. On the following day Pigot was arrested by Colonel Stuart and conveyed to St. Thomas's Mount, some nine miles from Madras, where he was left in an officer's house under the charge of a battery of artillery. The refractory members, under whose orders Pigot's arrest had been made, immediately assumed the powers of the executive government, and suspended all their colleagues who had voted with the governor. Though the government of Bengal possessed a controlling authority over the other presidencies, it declined to interfere.

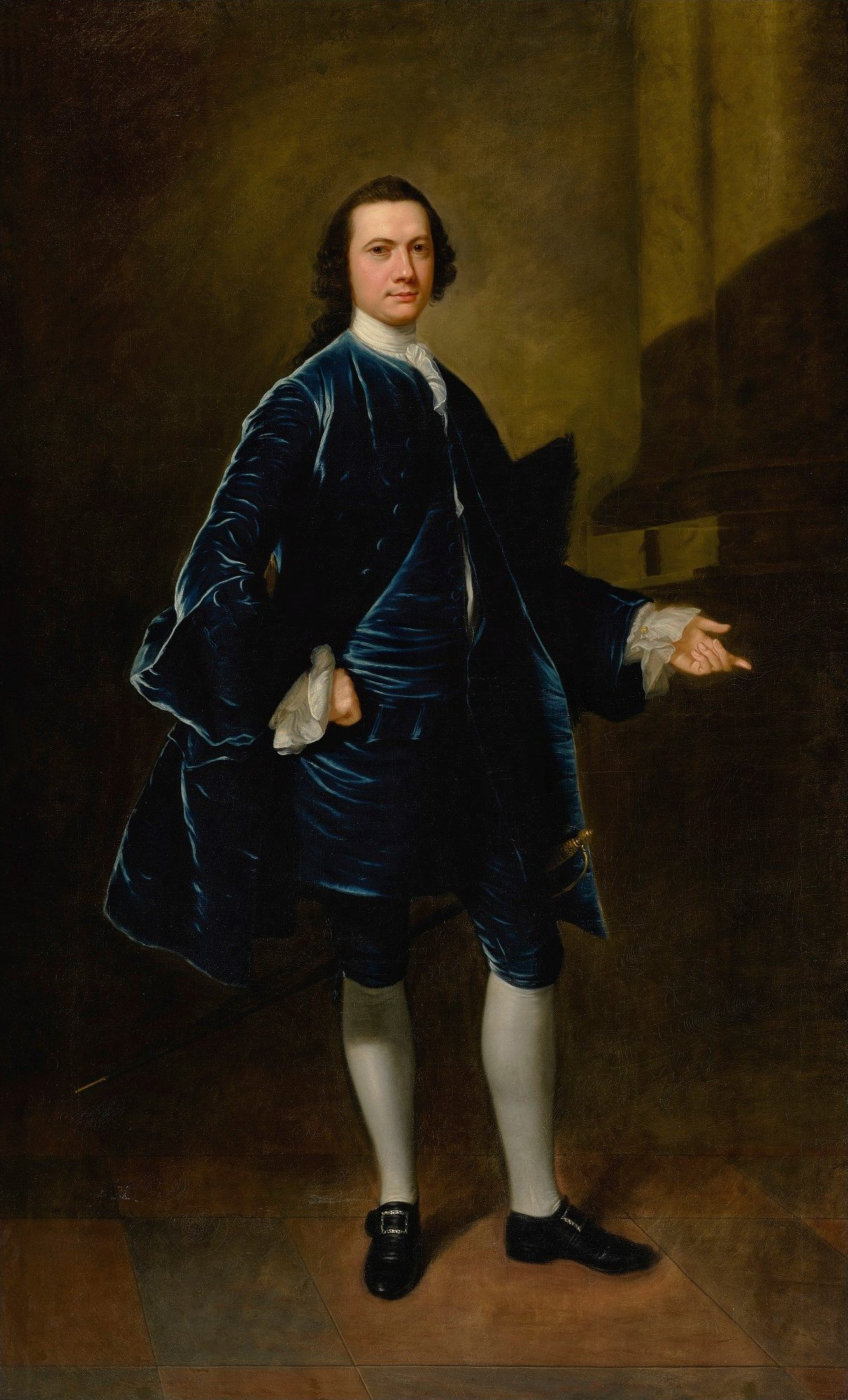
Portrait of Pigot by George Knapton

In England, the news of these proceedings excited much discussion. At a general court of the proprietors, a resolution that the directors should take effectual measures for restoring Lord Pigot, and for inquiring into the conduct of those who had imprisoned him, was carried on 31 March 1777, by 382 votes to 140. The feeling in Pigot's favour was much less strong in the court of directors, where, on 11 April following, a series of resolutions in favour of Pigot's restoration, but declaring that his conduct in several instances appeared to be reprehensible, was carried by the decision of the lot, the numbers on each side being equal. At a subsequent meeting of the directors, after the annual change in the court had taken place, it was resolved that the powers assumed by Lord Pigot were "neither known in the constitution of the Company nor authorised by charter, nor warranted by any orders or instructions of the Court of Directors". Pigot's friends, however, successfully resisted the passing of a resolution declaring the exclusion of Messrs. Stratton and Brooke from the council unconstitutional, and carried two other resolutions condemning Pigot's imprisonment and the suspension of those members of the council who had supported him. On the other hand, a resolution condemning the conduct of Lord Pigot in receiving small presents from the Nawab of Arcot, the receipt of which had been openly avowed in a letter to the court of directors, was carried. At a meeting of the general court held on 7 and 9 May a long series of resolutions was carried by a majority of ninety-seven votes, which censured the invasion of Pigot's rights as governor, and acquiesced in his restoration, but at the same time recommended that Pigot and all the members of the council should be recalled in order that their conduct might be more effectually inquired into. Owing to Lord North's opposition, Governor Johnstone failed to carry his resolutions in favour of Lord Pigot in the House of Commons on 21 May. The resolutions of the proprietors having been confirmed by the court of directors, Pigot was restored to his office by a commission under the company's seal of 10 June 1777, and was directed within one week to give up the government to his successor and forthwith to return to England.

=== Death ===
Pigot died on 11 May 1777, while under confinement at the company's Garden House, near Fort St. George, whither he had been allowed to return for change of air in the previous month. At the inquest held after his death, the jury recorded a verdict of willful murder against all those who had been concerned in Pigot's arrest. The real contest throughout had been between the Nawab of Arcot and the Raja of Tanjore. Members of the council took sides, and Pigot exceeded his powers while endeavouring to carry out the instructions of the directors. The proceedings before the coroner were held to be irregular by the supreme court of judicature in Bengal, and nothing came of the inquiry instituted by the company. On 16 April 1779, Admiral Hugh Pigot brought the subject of his brother's deposition before the House of Commons. A series of resolutions affirming the principal facts of the case was agreed to, and an address to the king, recommending the prosecution of Messrs. Stratton, Brooke, Floyer, and Mackay, who were at that time residing in England, was adopted. They were tried in the King's Bench before Lord Mansfield and a special jury in December 1779, and were found guilty of a misdemeanour in arresting, imprisoning, and deposing Lord Pigot. On being brought up for judgment on 10 February 1780, they were each sentenced to pay a fine of £1,000, on payment of which they were discharged.

== Family ==
Two of the governor's brothers were men of repute. Sir Robert Pigot (1720–1796), who succeeded to the baronetcy, commanded his regiment (the 38th) at the battles of Lexington and Bunker Hill during the American Revolutionary War. He became a lieutenant general in 1782. The other brother, Hugh Pigot (c. 1721–1792) was a sailor. After some years of service he became an admiral and commander-in-chief in the West Indies in 1782. One of his sons was General Sir Henry Pigot (1750–1840), and another was Hugh Pigot (1769–1797), a captain in the RN, who in September 1797, was murdered during a famous mutiny – caused by his own cruelty and brutality – while in command of HMS Hermione.

Pigot was unmarried. Upon his death the Irish barony became extinct, while the baronetcy devolved on his brother Robert Pigot. He left several natural children, among others:

1. Sophia Pigot, who married, on 14 March 1776, the Hon. Edward Monckton of Somerford Hall, Staffordshire, and died on 1 January 1834;
2. Richard Pigot (1774–1868), general in the army and colonel of the 4th dragoon guards;
3. Sir Hugh Pigot, K.C.B. (1775–1857), admiral of the White;
4. Leonora, who received a fortune under her father's will and married 17 October 1777 Claude Russell, member of the Madras Council; to the memory of her and her husband there is a tablet in Marylebone Church.
5. Major George Pigot (1772?-1830) Along with Richard and Hugh, son of Catherine Hill. Member of settler community who immigrated from England (1820) to present Eastern-Cape coast of South Africa.
6. Mary Green (c.1772-1852) who married, aged twelve in 1784, John Blashfield of Presteigne, Radnorshire.

== The Pigot Diamond ==
Pigot owned a celebrated diamond, now known as the Pigot Diamond, which he bequeathed to his siblings and eventually left the family by way of a lottery. The whereabouts of the diamond today is unknown.

Political offices
Preceded by Thomas Saunders	Governor of Madras; 1755–1763	Succeeded by Robert Palk
Preceded by Alexander Wynch	Governor of Madras; 1775–1776	Succeeded by George Stratton
Parliament of Great Britain
Preceded by John Hervey; Sir John Gibbons	Member of Parliament for Wallingford; 1765–1768; With: Sir John Gibbons	Succeeded by John Aubrey; Robert Pigot
Preceded by John Grey; William Whitmore	Member of Parliament for Bridgnorth; 1768–1777; With: William Whitmore 1768–177; Thomas Whitmore 1771–1777	Succeeded by Thomas Whitmore; Hugh Pigot
Peerage of Ireland
New creation	Baron Pigot; 1766–1777	Extinct
Baronetage of Great Britain
New creation	Baronet (of Patshull); 1763–1777	Succeeded by Robert Pigot
