= Pigot Diamond =

- Weight: 47.38 carats (9.476 g)
- Color: colorless
- Cut: oval-shaped brilliant
- Country of origin: India
- Mine of origin: Golkonda
- Discovered: pre-1763
- Original owner: Sir George Pigot (first documented)
- Owner: unknown

The Pigot Diamond, also sometimes called the Pigott Diamond, the Lottery Diamond, or the Great Lottery Diamond, was a large diamond that originated in India in the 18th century and was brought to England where at the time it was the largest diamond in Europe. It remained in Europe for half a century, changing hands several times until it was sold to the ruler of Egypt in the 1820s. What happened to it after that is unknown, inspiring a two-century mystery.

== Pigot acquisition ==
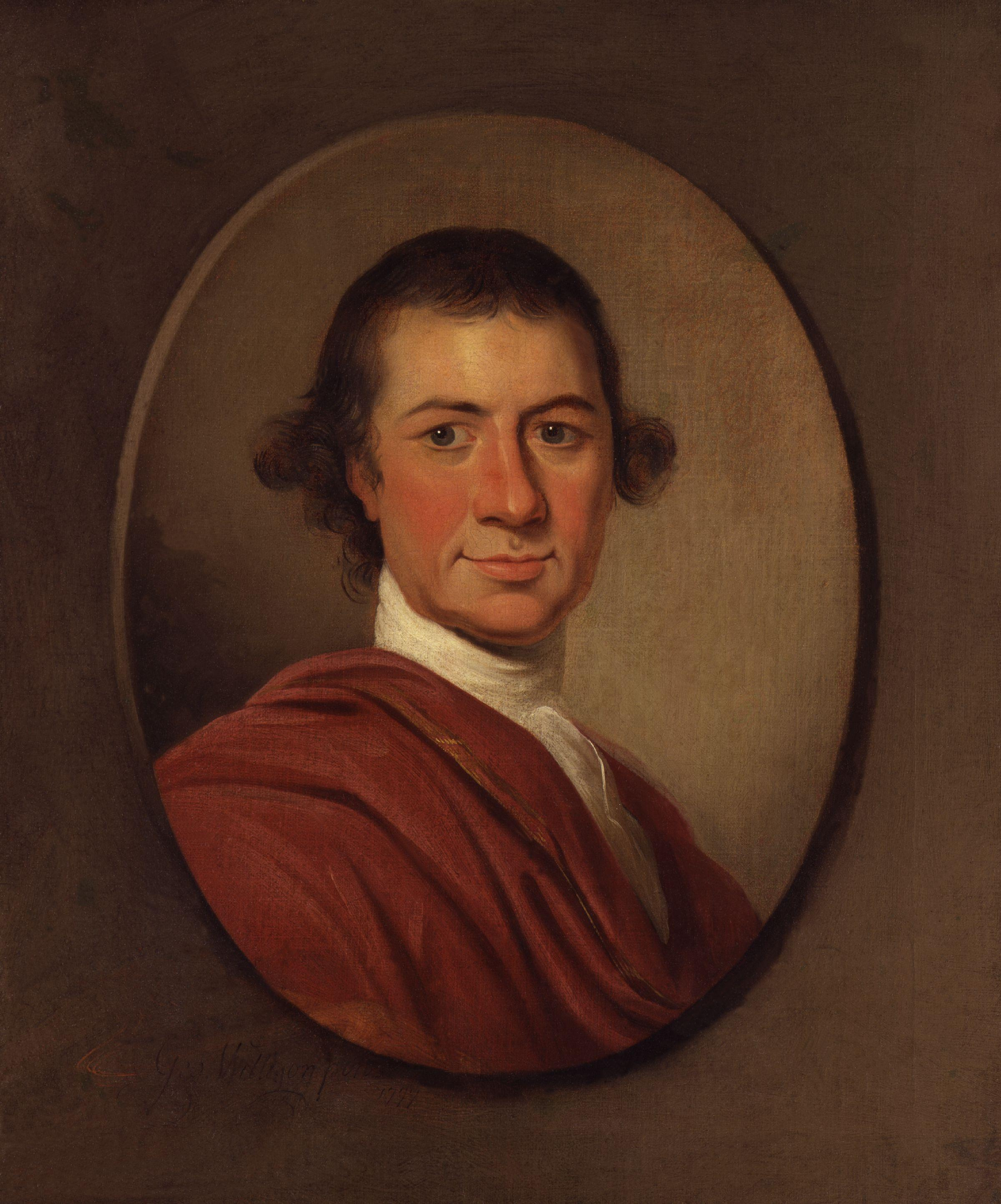
George, Baron Pigot, by George Willison

The Pigot Diamond was obtained by George Pigot during his term as British governor of Madras, the capital city of the Indian state of Tamil Nadu for the East India Company. He may have received it from an Indian prince in 1763. This may have been the Rajah of Tanjore as Pigot had told the directors of the East India Company that he had received presents from the Rajah. It also may have been Muhammad Ali Khan Wallajah, the Nabob of Arcot. The diamond may have been mined at Golkonda. Diamonds were a common way to transfer money back to England at the time. Pigot brought it to London, probably in June 1764 when he returned to England aboard the East Indiaman Plassey after his first term as governor of Madras (1755–1763). The diamond was brought to England rough cut and subsequently cut as a fine, oval brilliant, and had an official recorded weight of 47.38 carats (9.476 g). The cutting is said to have taken two years and cost £3,000. The size of the rough stone is estimated to have been around 100 carats (20 g). At the time, it was the largest diamond in England. It has been characterised as having a large table (the largest central facet of the crown) and girdle, but it is relatively shallow in depth giving it poor brilliance.

On Pigot's death in 1777, he bequeathed it to his brothers, Robert (1721–1796), who commanded the left flank of the British forces at the Battle of Bunker Hill and Hugh (1722–1792), Commander-in-Chief of the West Indies fleet of the Royal Navy, and his widowed sister Margaret, the wife of Thomas Fisher.

Upon Robert's death in 1796, his share passed to his son George Pigot. Upon Hugh's death in 1792, his share passed to his widow Frances and their five children. The joint owners attempted to sell the diamond but were unsuccessful as the perceived intrinsic value was so high and no reasonable offers were made.

An alternate account is that Pigot left the diamond to his children. Although unmarried, he had several natural children at the time of his death, all of whom were minors. Regardless of this, the diamond remained in the extended Pigot family.

== London lottery ==
Pigot and Fisher Diamond Lottery Act 1800
- Act of Parliament
- Parliament of the United Kingdom
- Long title: An Act to enable Sir George Pigot Baronet, Margaret Fischer and Frances Pigot, to dispose of a certain Diamond by a Lottery.
- Citation: 39 & 40 Geo. 3. c. cii
- Territorial extent: Great Britain

Dates
- Royal assent: 2 July 1800
- Commencement: 2 July 1800 (Note: The Acts of Parliament (Commencement) Act 1793.)
- Repealed: 31 January 2013
Other legislation
Repealed by	Statute Law (Repeals) Act 2013

Status: Repealed

Text of statute as originally enacted

A plan was conceived to conduct a lottery so that the Pigot family could receive full value without a single buyer willing and able to pay such an amount. Such a plan required the approval of the Parliament, who was so petitioned in February 1800, because games of chance were normally illegal. The petition was considered in the House of Commons and the House of Lords. There were arguments made for and against allowing the lottery, and it was approved on 2 July 1800. The act was titled An Act to enable Sir George Pigot Baronet, Margaret Fischer and Frances Pigot, to dispose of a certain Diamond by a Lottery or the Pigot and Fisher Diamond Lottery Act 1800.

The terms of the lottery were that 11,428 tickets could be sold for two guineas each. Therefore, the sale of all tickets would realize £23,998. The value had been estimated at £25,000 to £30,000. Newspapers advertised the lottery beginning in August. Tickets were available from stockbrokers, jewellers, newspapers, and other companies. The winning number, 9,488 was drawn on 2 March 1801 in Guildhall, London and had been purchased jointly by John Cruikshank, Richard Blanchford, and John Henderson of London and William Thompson of Walworth. The ticket was sold by Hornsby & Co.

== Christie's auction ==
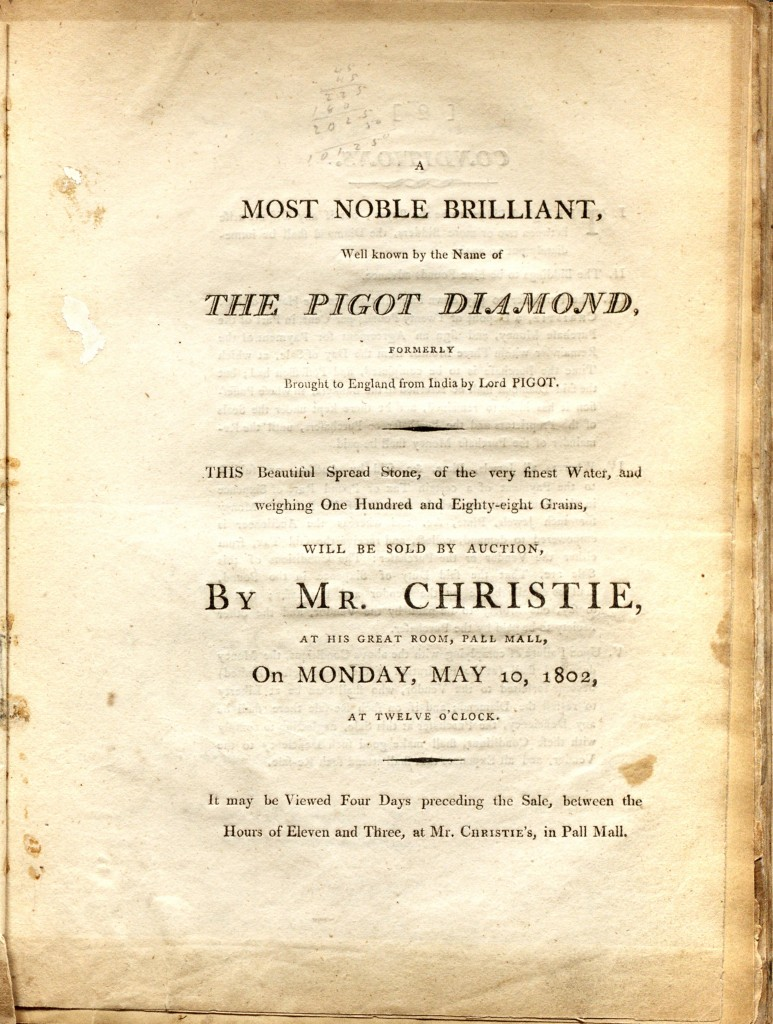
Auction announcement for Pigot diamond at Christie's, London, 10 May 1802

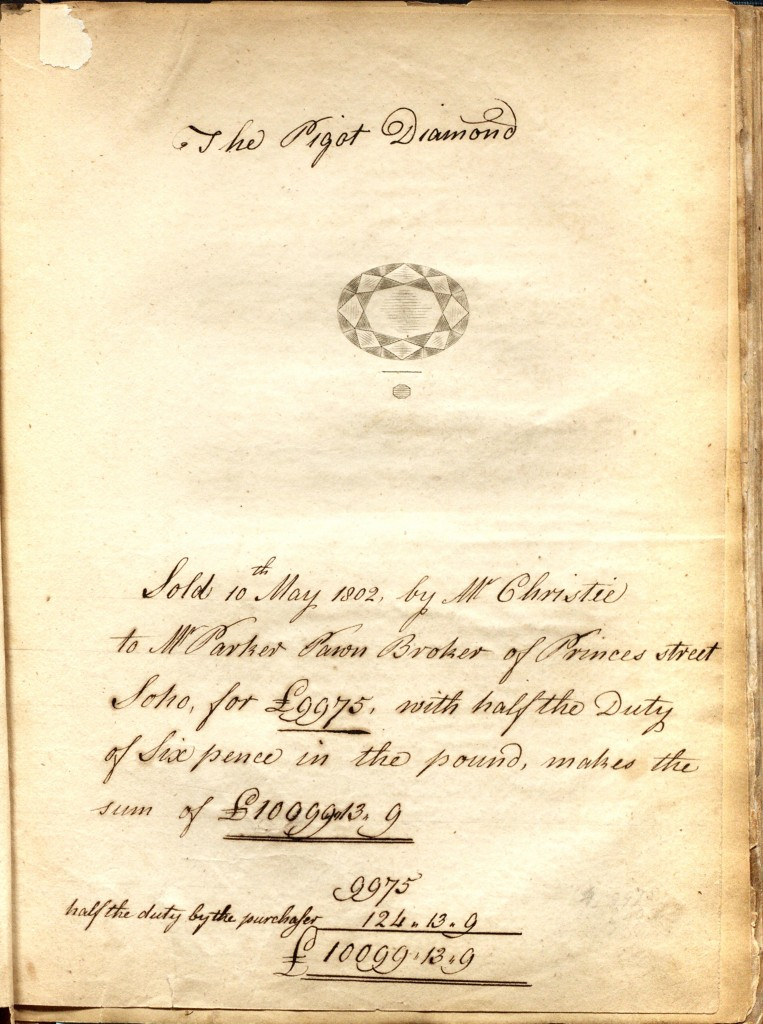
Auction results for Pigot diamond at Christie's, London, 10 May 1802

The next known sale occurred in 1802 when it was sold by auction, as weighing 188 grains (47 carats) at Christie's on Pall Mall, the centre of London's fine art scene at the time, on 10 May for £9,500 to a pawnbroker in Soho, a Mr. Parker of Parker and Birketts. Parker may have been acting on behalf of the famous London jewellers, Rundell and Bridge who in 1804 had obtained part ownership.

Christie's used this description of the diamond:

Its owners were unfortunate in its being brought to a market where its worth might not be sufficiently valued, where the charms of the fair needed not such ornaments, and whose sparkling eyes outshone all the diamonds of Golkonda. In any other county, the Pigot diamond would be sought as a distinction, where superior beauty was more rarely to be found.

== Attempted sale to Napoleon ==
In 1804, it was offered for sale to Napoleon Bonaparte, who was just made Emperor of the French by the French Senate. Rundell and Bridge thought this was an opportunity to interest Napoleon in the diamond. Since the ephemeral Peace of Amiens with England ended and France and England were again in conflict, the diamond had to be smuggled into France. It arrived in Paris after being brought through Holland by a man named Liebart, and was then offered to Napoleon by Laffitt & Co. Napoleon declined the offer, probably because he was aware it came from England, with whom he was still at war. The Times of London prematurely reported on 26 November 1804 that Napoleon had purchased the diamond.

Due to the conflict, the diamond was not immediately returned to England. It remained in France until 1816 when the situation stabilised and several lawsuits over the diamond were concluded.

Parker was anxious to obtain his share of the stone and contemplated a lawsuit which might have resulted in the diamond being divided into pieces, thus greatly reducing its value. Instead, Rundell and Bridge bought out Parker's share and became sole owners. An alternate report is that Parker filed a lawsuit to determine the value of his share of the diamond, resulting in the buyout.

E. W. Rundell went to France after the 1814 defeat of Napoleon to reclaim the diamond, but his lawsuit ended prematurely with the return to power of Napoleon who had escaped from exile in Elba. Rundell had to flee Paris, returning again after the final defeat of Napoleon in June 1815 at the Battle of Waterloo. Rundell filed another lawsuit which was ultimately successful, allowing the return of the diamond to England.

The diamond was known to be in London in 1818 and 1821.

Rundell and Bridge continued trying to sell the diamond, sending models to all the crowned heads of Europe.

== Egyptian sale ==
Rundell and Bridge finally sold the diamond to Muhammad Ali of Egypt, the self-declared Khedive of Egypt, for £30,000, the sale having been negotiated by Samuel Briggs, the British Consul in Alexandria. The date of this sale is given as 1822, 1823, and 1830.

Mohammed Ali purchased the diamond as a gift for Mahmud II, the Ottoman sultan in Istanbul, one of many such gifts to Mahmud, possibly to compensate for Ali not supporting the Ottomans in the suppression of Greek during the Greek War of Independence of 1821–1832 (a position for which the sultan called for his execution) or to gain the sultan's acknowledgement of Ali's right to govern Egypt.

An 1830 account details that the diamond was purchased in London by an agent of Muhammad Ali for Mahmud, and then taken by a British admiral in his coat pocket to the Royal Navy's naval port in Portsmouth, from where he was to depart for the Mediterranean. Although England was one of the European nations that intervened on behalf of Greece and defeated the Ottoman fleet in the 1827 Battle of Navarino, it maintained cordial relations with the Ottomans in the earlier part of the conflict when the diamond was most likely sold.

The fate of the diamond after this time has not been established.

== Speculation ==
There are several stories about the diamond after it left England.

=== Ali Pasha ===
One legend says that the diamond was sold to Ali Pasha of Tepelena, the Ottoman pasha of the western part of Rumelia, the empire's European territory. It then passed to the Sultan Mahmud II, either in Ali Pasha's lifetime, as part of his complicated dealings with the central Ottoman government, or after his execution, when his possessions were confiscated by the Sultan.

However, another version of this legend is that Ali Pasha held on to the diamond until his last day; when mortally wounded on 5 February 1822, the dying Ali Pasha reportedly ordered that it be crushed to powder in his presence – which it was. Since Ali Pasha died violently, having been shot multiple times and then immediately beheaded, this is implausible.

Since Ali Pasha was executed in 1822, he could not have purchased the diamond and the association to him is based on confusion of his name, Ali Pasha of Tepelena, with the actual purchaser, Mohammed Ali Pasha. There are also sources that say the confusion is in the opposite direction and Ali Pasha of Tepelena actually bought the diamond.

=== Spoonmaker's Diamond ===
It has also been suggested that the diamond passed from Egypt to Turkey and is now exhibited as the Spoonmaker's Diamond (Turkish: Kaşıkçı Elması), the most valuable single exhibit of the Imperial Treasury exhibitions at the Topkapi Palace Museum. However, the weight of the Spoonmaker's Diamond, 86 carats (17.2 g), is much larger than that of the Pigot Diamond (47.38 carats (9.476 g)), and it is of a different shape, precluding them from being the same stones.

This story survives because the origin of the Spoonmaker's diamond and how it came to the Ottoman Empire is not known. One version of the Spoonmaker's history is that a French officer named Pigot purchased the diamond from the Maharajah of Madras in 1774 (less than 10 years after Sir George Pigot received the Pigot diamond) and brought it to France from India. The diamond passed through several owners and was then sold by auction to Madam Bonaparte, Napoleon's mother. She then sold the diamond upon Napoleon's exile, to Ali Pasha of Tepelena, and upon his execution the diamond was confiscated by the Sultan Mahmud II and the "French Pigot Diamond" subsequently became the Spoonmaker's diamond. The existence of a different "French Pigot Diamond" is unlikely as only the English Pigot diamond is listed in diamond reference books.

=== Queen of Albania ===
A contemporary reference, which states that it attempts to be a "relatively" complete dictionary of gemology lists the Queen of Albania Diamond as a 49.03 carats (9.806 g) pear-shaped diamond, probably from South Africa, owned by Queen Geraldine of Albania until she sold it in London in 1960. It then states that this diamond "is believed...to be the same as the Pigott Diamond." Although the size is similar, the shape is different making this unlikely.

== Contradictory mentions ==
The November 1804 edition of The Gentleman's Magazine, a London periodical, published that the Pigot diamond was purchased by or for Madam Bonaparte, Napoleon's mother, for a necklace.

In 1840, a British scholastic book said the Pigot diamond, after having been sold to Mohammed Ali, somehow came to be an ornament on Bonaparte's sword of state and in 1840 was in the possession of the King of France. This is unlikely since the sale to Ali did not take place until after Bonaparte's death. Another famous diamond, the Pitt Diamond, that also originated in India before being acquired by an Englishman (Thomas Pitt), was sold to French royalty and eventually was mounted to the pommel of Napoleon's sword.

In an 1862 publication, the diamond's history was accurately recounted to the possession of Rundell & Bridge, but said it then went to a Portuguese Prince.

A 1928 write-up said the diamond was sold by Rundell & Bridge in 1818 to "Ali Pasha, the Khedive of Egypt". Apart from the sale date being too early, this is otherwise correct. It then went on to tell the tale of Ali Pasha, Ottoman pasha of Europe ordering destruction of the stone. This is apparently another case of confusion of similar names. This source also erroneously states the diamond weighted 85.8 carats (17.16 g), as do others, lending credence to the speculation that the Pigot and Spoonmaker's diamond are the same.

In 1858, an American magazine, Harper's New Monthly Magazine said that the diamond was brought to England in 1801, approximately 35 years later than the actual date, and was won in the lottery by a woman who then sold it to the Pasha of Egypt. This account bypasses the Christie's auction and the ownership by Rundell & Bridge.

== Other ==
Dr. George Frederick Kunz, American mineralogist, wrote about the mysterious Pigot Diamond in 1897 for the Century Magazine.

== See also ==
- List of diamonds
