= Governor Stratton =

Governor Stratton may refer to:

- Charles C. Stratton (1796–1859), 15th Governor of New Jersey
- George Stratton (politician) (1730s–1800), Governor of Madras from 1776 to 1777
- William Stratton (1914–2001), 32nd Governor of Illinois
