= Sir George Pigot, 3rd Baronet =

British Army officer

General Sir George Pigot Bt
- Born: 1766
- Died: 1840 (aged 73–74)
- Military career
- Allegiance: United Kingdom
- Branch: British Army
- Service years: 1787–1840
- Rank: General
- Commands: 130th Regiment of Foot

General Sir George Pigot, 3rd Baronet (1766–1840) was a British Army officer. The son of Lieutenant-General Sir Robert Pigot, 2nd Baronet he served in the 38th Regiment of Foot, 1st (Royal) Regiment of Foot and the Independent Companies before being asked to recruit his own unit, the 130th Regiment of Foot, in 1794. Pigot was granted command of the unit, as lieutenant-colonel, in 1795. It served in the West Indies where it was almost wiped out by disease and disbanded in 1796. Pigot inherited the baronetcy in 1796 and was appointed deputy lieutenant of the Staffordshire Militia in 1797. He was reappointed to the army in 1800 and was promoted to major-general in 1812 and to general in 1825.

== Biography ==
George Pigot was born in 1766, the son of Robert Pigot who became a lieutenant-general in the British Army and inherited the Pigot baronetcy from his brother, the East India Company civil servant George Pigot. George Pigot, son of Robert, is presumed to have been born in Ireland. He was educated at Eton College.

George Pigot joined the British Army as an ensign in the 38th Regiment of Foot on 9 June 1787. He afterwards served in the second battalion of the 1st (Royal) Regiment of Foot and was appointed lieutenant in one of the Independent Companies on 27 January 1791. Pigot was captain by 9 April 1791 when he exchanged into the 31st Regiment of Foot.

Pigot was involved in the raising of the 130th Regiment of Foot, formed from 1794, and was promised command of the unit if he raised enough recruits. He advanced to major in the 31st by purchase on 17 February 1795 and purchased the rank of lieutenant-colonel on 17 February 1795, being listed as an "independent officer", not associated with a regiment. Pigot received command of the 130th on 21 March 1795. The regiment was posted to the West Indies where it was almost destroyed by tropical disease. The unit disbanded in 1796, with the survivors being drafted into other regiments. Pigot went into half pay retirement.

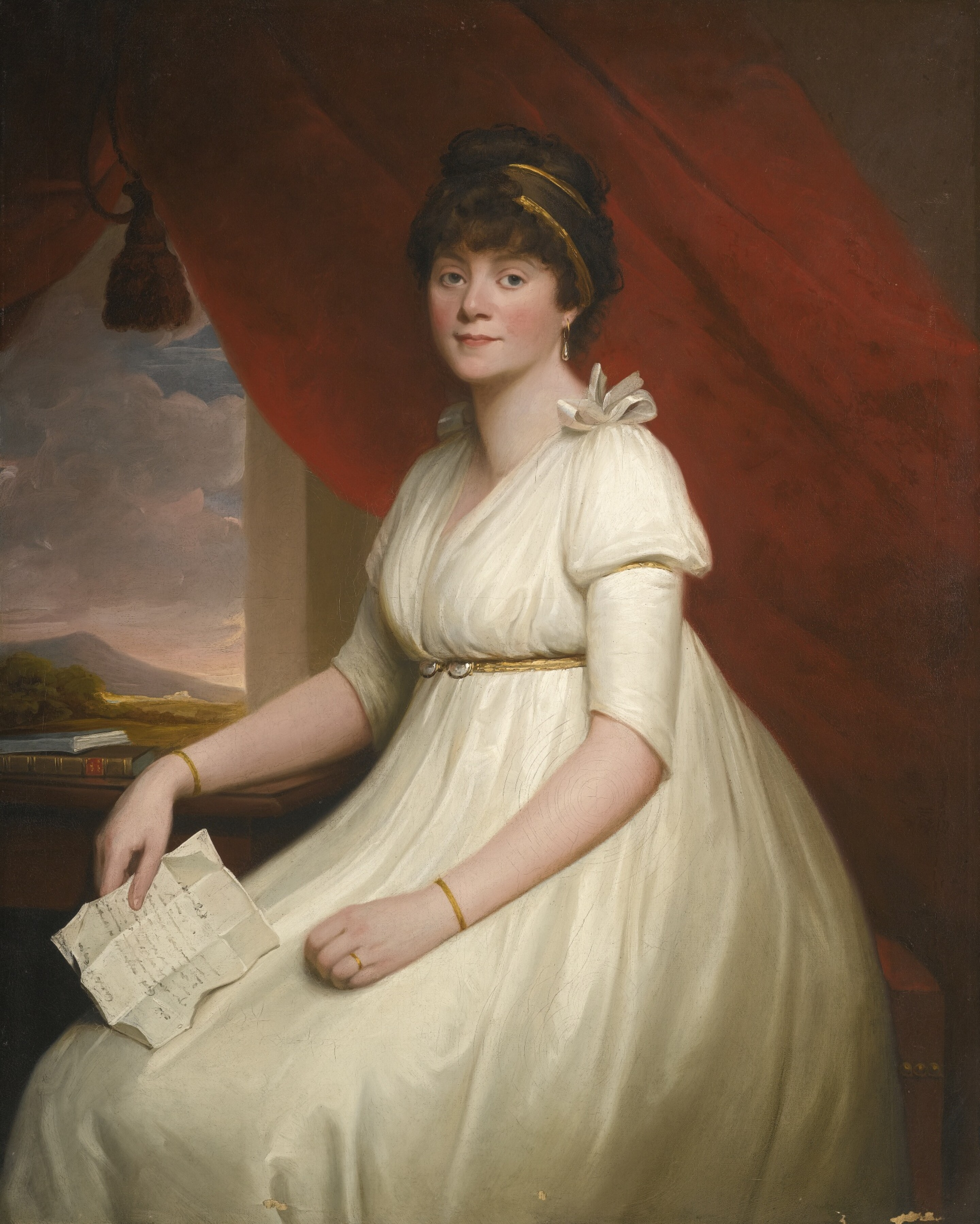
William Beechey, Portrait of Mary Anne Pigot, née Monckton

In 1796 Pigot inherited the baronetcy from his father and married Mary Anne Monckton. He was appointed a deputy lieutenant of the Staffordshire Militia on 15 March 1797. Pigot was nominated as sheriff of Staffordshire in 1799, by which time he was resident at the family seat of Patshull Hall. He was nominated for the position again in 1803, 1807 and 1824, being successful on the last occasion (the appointment being made in 1825).

Pigot was reappointed to the British Army on 1 January 1800, as a lieutenant-colonel. On 2 July 1800 he received an act of parliament to dispose of the Pigot Diamond, brought from India by his uncle, by means of a public lottery. Pigot was appointed to the brevet rank of major-general on 1 January 1812 and to the brevet rank of general on 27 May 1825. He died in 1840.

Baronetage of Great Britain
Preceded by Robert Pigot	Baronet (of Patshull); 1796–1840	Succeeded by Robert Pigot
