= 130 =

130 may refer to:

- 130 (number), the natural number following 129 and preceding 131
- AD 130, a common year starting on Saturday of the Julian calendar
- 130 BC, a year of the pre-Julian Roman calendar
- Kin Sang stop, MTR digital station code
- 130 Elektra, a main-belt asteroid
- Škoda 130, a small family car
- Fiat 130, a large executive car

== See also ==
- 130th (disambiguation)
