= 130th =

130th may refer to:

== Military units ==
- 130th Battalion (Lanark and Renfrew), CEF, unit in the Canadian Expeditionary Force during the First World War
- 130th Airlift Squadron, unit of the United States Air Force
- 130th Airlift Wing, unit of the West Virginia Air National Guard
- 130th Baluchis, infantry regiment of the British Indian Army
- 130th Engineer Brigade, unit of the United States Army
- 130th Illinois Infantry Regiment, unit in the Union Army during the American Civil War
- 130th Infantry Brigade, Territorial brigade of the British Army, formerly the Devon & Cornwall
- 130th Infantry Regiment (United States), unit in the Army National Guard
- 130th Light Anti-Aircraft Regiment or Royal Scots, unit of the British Army
- 130th (Lowland) Field Regiment, Royal Artillery, unit of the British Army
- 130th New York Infantry Regiment, unit in the Union Army during the American Civil War
- 130th Ohio Infantry Regiment, unit in the Union Army during the American Civil War
- 130th Regiment of Foot, infantry regiment of the British Army, created in 1794 and disbanded in 1796
- 130th Rescue Squadron, unit of the California Air National Guard
- German 130th Panzer Lehr Division, German unit during World War II

== Other uses ==
- 130th Delaware General Assembly, meeting of the legislative branch of the Delaware state government
- 130th Kentucky Derby or 2004 Kentucky Derby
- 130th meridian east, line of longitude across the Arctic Ocean, Asia, Australia, the Indian Ocean, the Southern Ocean and Antarctica
- 130th meridian west, line of longitude across the Arctic Ocean, North America, the Pacific Ocean, the Southern Ocean and Antarctica
- 130th Street station, former station in Manhattan, New York City, United States
- 130th Street (Manhattan), Manhattan, New York City, United States
- Pennsylvania's 130th Representative District or Pennsylvania House of Representatives, District 130

== See also ==
- 130th Regiment (disambiguation)
- 130 (number)
- AD 130, the year 130 (CXXX) of the Julian calendar
- 130 BC
