= Robert Pigott =

Robert Pigott may refer to:

- Robert Pigott (MP) (1665–1746), English landowner and Whig politician
- Robert Pigott (radical) (c. 1736–1794), his grandson, English food and dress reformer, a radical in politics and manners

== See also ==
- Robert Pigot (disambiguation)
