= Sir Robert Pigot, 2nd Baronet =

British Army officer (1720–1796)

Lieutenant-General Sir Robert Pigot Bt
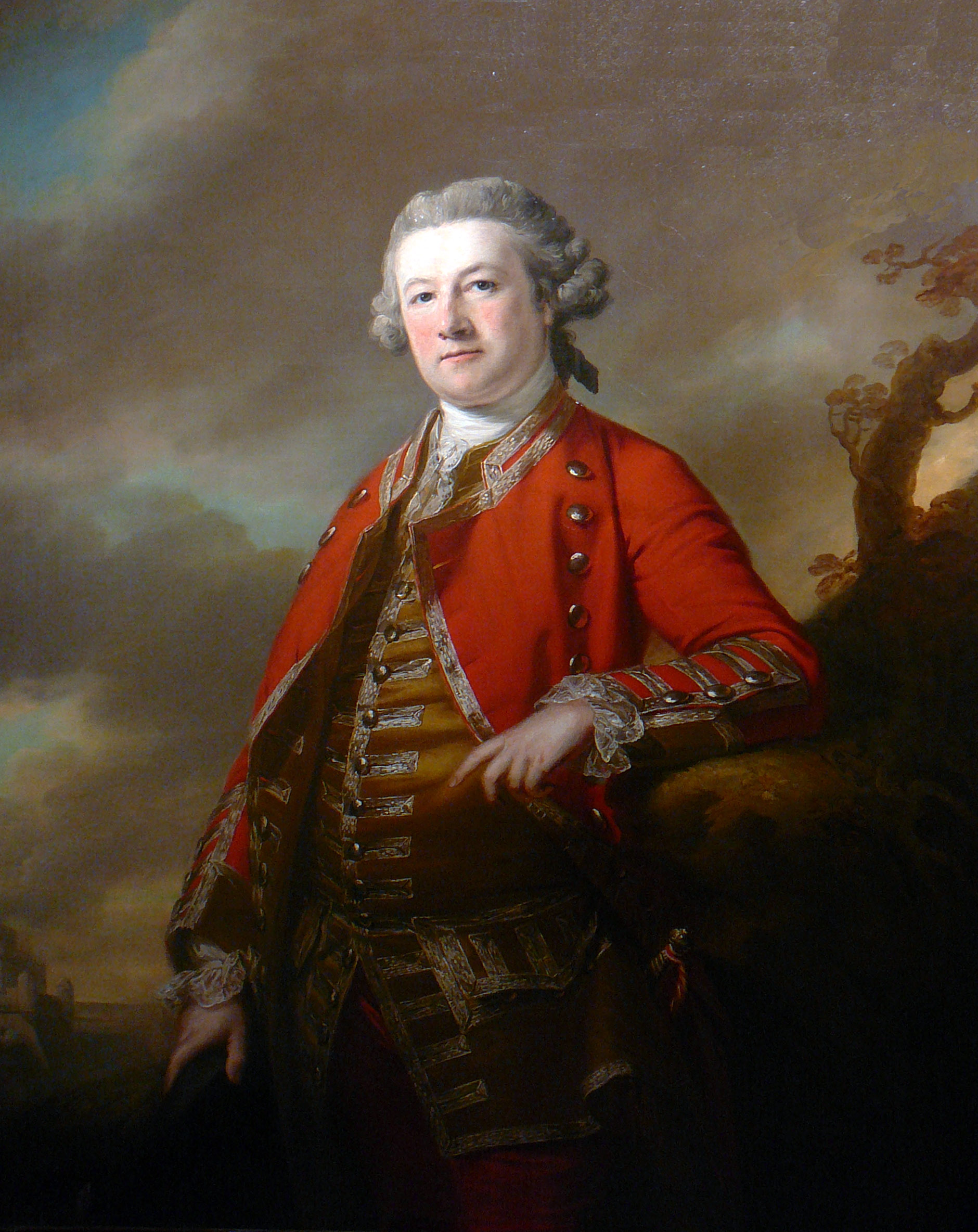
- Portrait by Francis Cotes, c. 1765
- Born: 20 September 1720; London, England
- Died: 1 August 1796 (aged 75); Stafford, England

Lieutenant-General Sir Robert Pigot, 2nd Baronet (20 September 1720 – 2 August 1796) was a British Army officer who served in the War of the Austrian Succession and the American War of Independence.

== Early life ==
Robert Pigot was born on 20 September in Westminster, London, England, in 1720. His two brothers were George Pigot, 1st Baron Pigot, Governor of Madras, India and Admiral Hugh Pigot, Commander-in-Chief of the West Indies fleet. He and his brothers shared Huguenot ancestry through their grandfather Peter Godde, who had come to England in the late seventeenth century.

== Career ==
Pigot served with the 31st regment in Flanders during the War of the Austrian Succession.

In 1758 Pigot was major in the 10th Regiment of Foot. In 1764 he was lieutenant colonel. From 1769 to 1775 he was the commander of the 38th Regiment of Foot.

He also served as a member of parliament for Wallingford from 1768 to 1772. He was appointed Warden of the Mint from August, 1771 until his death.

On 17 June 1775 he commanded the left flank of the British assault in the Battle of Bunker Hill. On 9 July he was colonel in the 55th Regiment of Foot. He was promoted to the permanent grade of colonel for his bravery in the battle of Bunker Hill. He was made a major general in 1777. Pigot was placed in command in Rhode Island before returning to England in 1779; he was made a lieutenant general in 1782. In the Battle of Rhode Island he fought with 3,000 men against 5,000 men under General John Sullivan.

== Personal life and death ==
He inherited the baronetcy of his older brother Lord George Pigot (it had been created with special remainder) and the Patshull Hall estate in 1777. He also inherited a one-third share of the Pigot Diamond, which remained in the family until sold in a lottery in 1801.

Pigot died 2 August 1796 in Patshull, Staffordshire, England.

Parliament of Great Britain
Preceded by Sir John Gibbons; George Pigot	Member of Parliament for Wallingford; 1768–1772; With: John Aubrey	Succeeded by John Aubrey; John Cator
Military offices
Preceded by The Earl of Cavan	Colonel of the 55th Regiment of Foot; 1775	Succeeded by James Grant
Political offices
Preceded by William Whitmore	Warden of the Mint; 1771–1796	Succeeded by Sir Walter James
Baronetage of Great Britain
Preceded by George Pigot	Baronet (of Patshull); 1777–1796	Succeeded by George Pigot
