= George Frederick Stratton =

George Frederick Stratton (1779–c.1834) was an English landowner and Fellow of the Royal Society.

== Early life ==
He was the elder son of George Stratton, a nabob who purchased Tew Park in Oxfordshire, and his wife Hester Eleanor Light. He matriculated at St John's College, Cambridge in 1797, graduating B.A. in 1801, and M.A. in 1804. He inherited from his father in 1800, and demolished much of the manor house at Tew Park. He moved into the dower house, to the north, built by the Keck family. Plans were made for a new mansion house, involving Humphry Repton and John Adey Repton; but they were not carried out.

In early 1803, Stratton became a captain in the Bloxham and Banbury Gentlemen and Yeomanry Cavalry. He tried for a seat in parliament, first at Eye. He then in 1803 stood at Coventry, as a supporter of William Pitt the Younger, at a by-election, spent heavily, but was defeated. He later asked Pitt for a baronetcy. He received an honorary degree from the University of Oxford in 1806, and served as High Sheriff of Oxfordshire for 1806–7.

== Estate at Great Tew ==
In February 1807, Stratton was elected to the Royal Society. He undertook an experiment in convertible husbandry on the Great Tew estate with John Claudius Loudon, from about 1808. Loudon had published a pamphlet that year on increasing the income from estates, and Stratton leased Tew Lodge Farm to him. Loudon set up a local agricultural training college. In 1811 Stratton took back the lease. Financial losses then led him to put the estate up for sale, in 1815. It went to Matthew Robinson Boulton.

In 1819 Charles Powell Hamilton sued Stratton in the court of King's Bench to recover money invested in a yellow fever remedy. Stratton, defended by James Scarlett, settled the case. He gave his address as New Park, Oxfordshire. Another such case involving Stratton was heard that year.

== Religious interests ==
Around 1812, after reading Herbert Marsh's views on the British and Foreign Bible Society, Stratton set up an Auxiliary Bible Society in Oxfordshire. His religious views were Methodist and anti-Catholic.

== Political candidate in Oxfordshire ==
In 1826, Stratton stood as a candidate for Oxfordshire, in the constituency's first contested parliamentary election since 1754. He came third in the poll, behind William Henry Ashhurst and John Fane.

== Bankruptcy, emigration and death ==
In 1832, as a local patron of the British and Foreign Bible Society, Stratton's address was Bourton on the Water, Gloucestershire. As an Honorary Governor, however, his address was given as Park Hall, Alcester, Warwickshire.

Faced with financial troubles, Stratton emigrated. He died in the USA about 1834, shortly before his mother died.

== Family and the Delany legacy ==
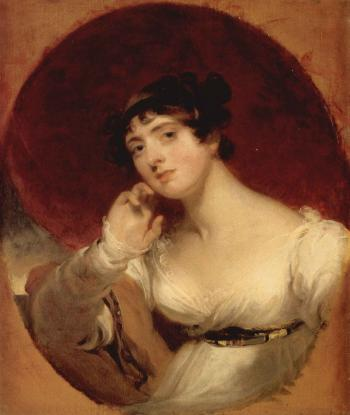
Anne Stratton

Stratton married in 1805 Anne D'Ewes (1776–1861), only daughter of Bernard D'Ewes and his first wife, Anne de la Bere. Through the Granvilles, she was great-niece of Mary Delany, who was daughter of Bernard Granville (1671–1723). The marriage was childless.

When Stratton left for America to escape his debts, leaving his wife and mother, the residence Park Hall and contents were put up for sale. The noted decoupage work of Mary Delany had been left to Anne Stratton. It was bought at auction by Benjamin Hall, who also purchased Anne Stratton's paintings. His wife, Augusta Hall, Baroness Llanover, another great-niece of Mary Delany, edited and published The Autobiography and Correspondence of Mrs Delany (1861–2). She left Delany's work, the Flora Delanica, to the British Museum.
