= Spoonmaker's Diamond =

86 carats pear-shaped diamond

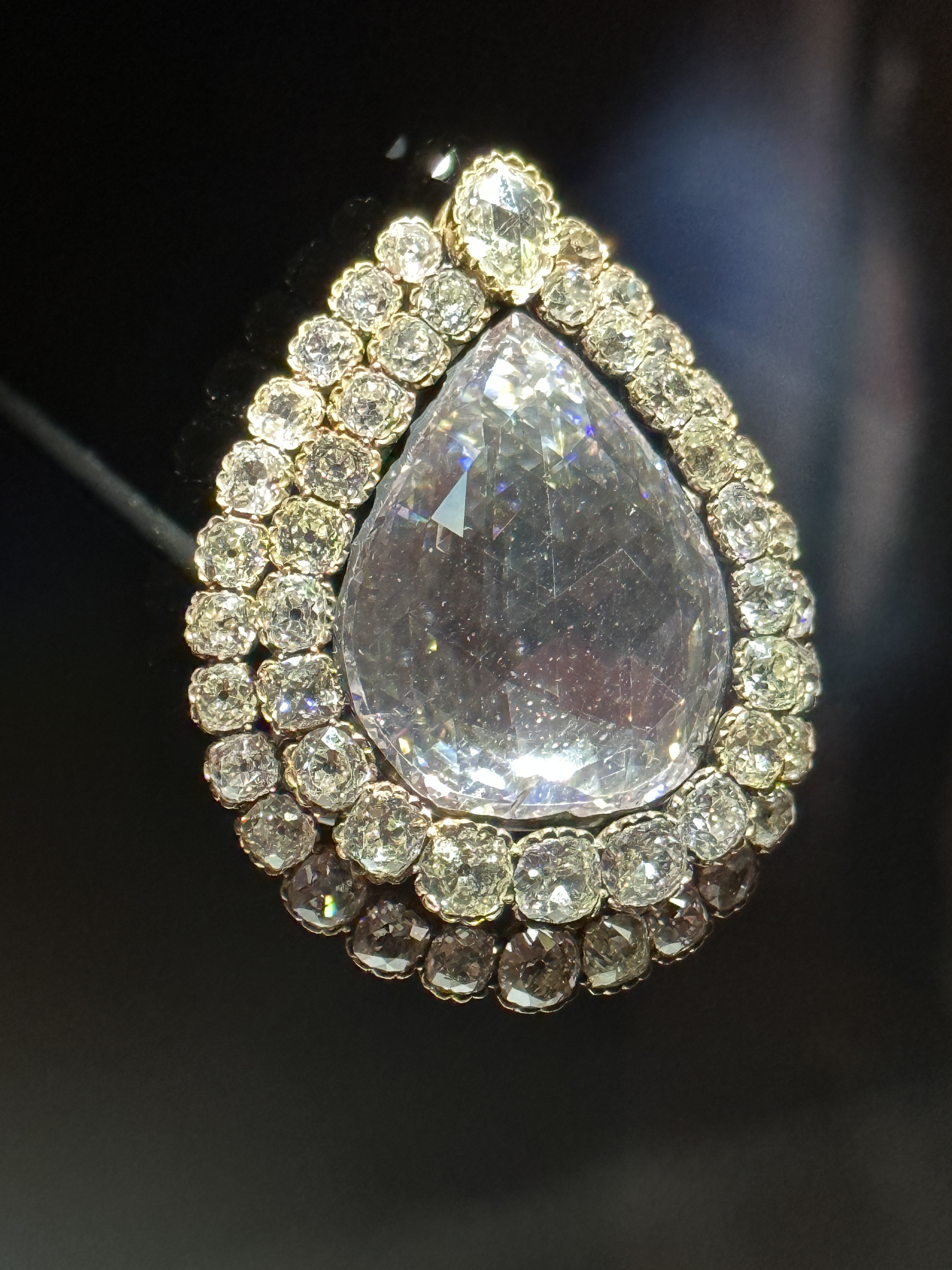
The Spoonmaker's Diamond displayed at Topkapı Palace

The Spoonmaker's Diamond (Turkish: Kaşıkçı Elması) is an 86 carat (17.2g) pear-shaped diamond in the Imperial Treasury exhibitions at the Topkapi Palace Museum in Istanbul, Turkey, and its most valuable single exhibit. It is considered the fourth largest diamond of its kind in the world.

Set in silver, surrounded by a double row of 49 old-mine cut diamonds (brilliants), it hangs in a glass case on the wall of the third room in Imperial Treasury section of Topkapı's "Conqueror’s Pavilion".

These surrounding separate brilliants give it "the appearance of a full moon lighting a bright and shining sky amidst the stars" and are considered to have been commissioned either by Ali Pasha or by Sultan Mahmud II – though this, as all other details of the diamond's origins, is doubtful and disputed.

== History ==
It is not known with any certainty how this diamond came to the Topkapı Palace. The museum's records do list a ring stone called the Spoonmaker's Diamond, which is noted as having already belonged to the 17th century Sultan Mehmet IV. However, this stone, along with its gold, is only 10–12 g (50–60 carats), which is much smaller than the present Spoonmaker's Diamond. Several mutually exclusive accounts exist regarding the origin of the Spoonmaker's Diamond. They continue to circulate, having become part of the Turkish popular culture and being repeated by tourist guides, and in printed guide books.

=== The naive fisherman ===
According to one tale, a poor fisherman in Istanbul near Yenikapi was wandering idly, empty-handed, along the shore when he found a shiny stone among the litter, which he turned over and over, not knowing what it was. After carrying it about in his pocket for a few days, he stopped by the jewelers' market, showing it to the first jeweler he encountered. The jeweler took a casual glance at the stone and appeared uninterested, saying "It's a piece of glass, take it away if you like, or if you like I'll give you three spoons. You brought it all the way here, at least let it be worth your trouble." What was the poor fisherman to do with this piece of glass? What's more, the jeweler had felt sorry for him and was giving three spoons. He said okay and took the spoons, leaving in their place an enormous treasure. It is said that for this reason the diamond came to be named "The Spoonmaker's Diamond". Later, the diamond was bought by a vizier on behalf of the Sultan (or, by a less likely version, it was the vizier who dealt directly with the fisherman).

Variant versions, published in some Istanbul Travel guides, describe the original finder as "a farmer who found it on the ground, and who sold it to a dealer" from whom it eventually "came to a Sultan in the 17th century".

According to still other tales, the name is derived from the finder having actually been a spoonmaker, or that the diamond was given this name because it resembled the bowl of a spoon.

=== Ali Pasha of Tepelena ===
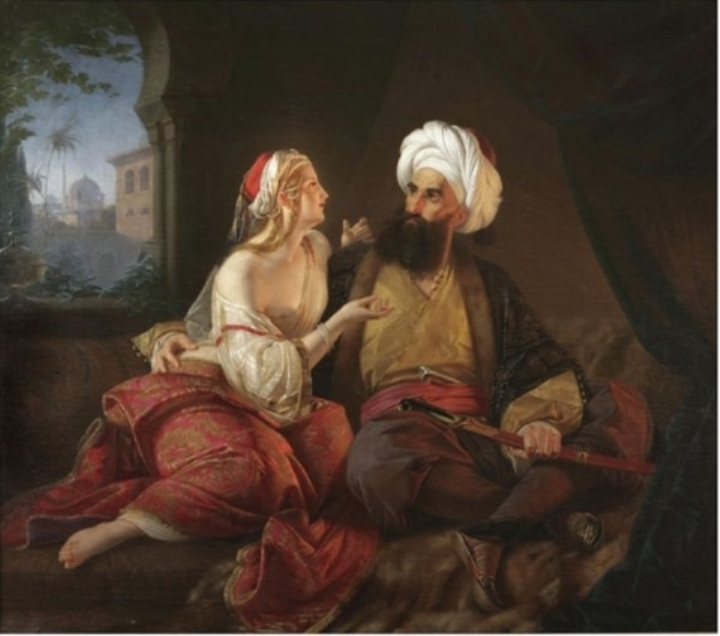
Ali Pasha and his favourite wife Kira Vassiliki, by Paul Emil Jacobs.

A persistent element in several accounts of the diamond's origin links it with the well-known Ali Pasha of Tepelena, who in the late 18th and early 19th Centuries was the Ottoman governor of much of present-day Albania and Greece, and who set himself up as a virtually independent ruler.

The Spoonmaker's Diamond is asserted to have been in Ali Pasha's possession for a short or long time before arriving at the Ottoman capital. By some versions, it had been at one time worn by Kira Vassiliki, Ali Pasha's favorite wife (or mistress). Its eventual passing into the Sultan's hands might have taken place either during Ali Pasha's lifetime, as part of his complicated dealings with the central Ottoman government, or after his execution, when his possessions were confiscated by the Sultan.

The following versions, through mutually contradictory, are all compatible with Ali Pasha having had a part in the diamond's history.

=== Captain Camus and Napoleon's mother ===
A widespread strand of stories links the origins of the Spoonmaker's Diamond with historic events at the town of Preveza, Epirus. In 1797 the town was ceded to France and garrisoned by 700 of Napoleon I's French grenadiers under General La Salchette, together with some 200 armed Prevezian Greek citizens and some 60 Albanian Souliotes. However, in the Battle of Nicopolis of 12–13 October 1798, this force was overwhelmed by 7000 Turkish-Albanian warriors under Ali Pasha and his son Muhtar. In the aftermath, French and Greeks were massacred in Preveza and at Port Salaora on the Ambracian Gulf. Many prisoners who survived the massacre died from the hardships on the road to Ali Pasha's capital at Ioannina, where they were paraded in the streets. Nine French officers were sent on to Sultan Selim III in Istanbul, among them Captain Louis-Auguste Camus de Richemont and another officer named Tissot. Camus remained in captivity until 1801, when he was ransomed and returned to a long and distinguished military career, eventually attaining the rank of general. Onto the above historically attested facts was added an unattested story, according to which Captain Camus was the lover of Napoleon Bonaparte's mother Letizia Ramolino. After receiving the news of his capture, the story goes, Letizia contacted Sultan Selim III, and immediately sent a "Big Diamond" by ship to Preveza as a present for the Sultan, with the expectation of her lover's liberation. The diamond went from Preveza to Ioannina (presumably in Ali Pasha's custody) and then to Istanbul. An additional detail appearing in some versions is that the diamond had previously belonged to the executed Queen Marie Antoinette.

Finally Captain Camus and the other French soldiers were liberated, while the diamond remained in the Topkapi Palace, in possession of Sultan Selim III and his successors.

As noted, there is no clear historical evidence either for a relationship between Captain Camus and Letizia Ramolino or for her having sent the diamond to the Sultan. It is noteworthy that in some versions Captain Camus is mentioned as having been 47 years old at the time, which would make his age compatible with that of Letizia Ramolino (who was 48 then). However, in fact Camus is known to have been only 27 in 1798. At the time Letizia was not yet the Emperor's mother, but simply the mother of a rising young general of Revolutionary France – not so likely to have the power and authority attributed to her in the story.

Much later Camus, by then a General, published his memoirs in three volumes. In one passage he does mention that during their year in possession of Preveza, the French soldiers carrying out fortification work in a place called Mazoma revealed in their excavations the eastern cemetery of ancient Nicopolis. There many treasures came to light—jewelry, lamps, pottery, etc.—all of which were pillaged by the soldiers. However, Camus makes no reference to a big diamond having been among these ancient treasures. In any case, almost all French soldiers were killed in the Battle of Nicopolis and its aftermath, their belongings being looted by the victorious Turkish and Albanian troops.

Despite being historically doubtful, this romantic story is often repeated. The account was, for example, included in a recent documentary of Japanese State Television, "Preveza" (2004).

=== The Pigot Diamond ===
It has sometimes been suggested that the gem is one and the same as the Pigot Diamond, which was at one time the largest diamond in England but details about it since it left England in the 1820s are unknown. There are various legends about the Pigot Diamond, some of which partially overlap legends about the Spoonmaker's Diamond. Stories about the two diamonds have been related, which is especially convenient since the disposition of the Pigot Diamond and the origin of the Spoonmaker's Diamond are both unresolved.

In any case, the recorded weight of the Pigot Diamond was just 47.38 carats (9.476 g), and it is an oval shape, which would exclude the possibility of its being the Spoonmaker's Diamond.

=== Which sultan first got the diamond? ===
In 1798, when Preveza was captured by Ali Pasha, the Ottoman Sultan was Selim III. Selim III (Ottoman Turkish: سليم ثالث Selīm-i sālis) (24 December 1761 – 28 or 29 July 1808) was the reform-minded Sultan of the Ottoman Empire from 1789 to 1807. The Janissaries eventually deposed and imprisoned him, and placed his cousin Mustafa on the throne as Mustafa IV. Selim was killed by a group of assassins subsequently after a janissary revolt. It is logical, that Reticia Ramolino Bonaparte sent the Diamond in year 1798 or 1799. So, the Sultan who took the "Gift" was Selim III. In 1822, when Ali Pasha was killed, the Sultan was Mahmud II from year 1808. Assuming that the above stories contain at least a nucleus of historical truth, and that Ali Pasha was involved in the diamond arriving at Topkapı, one of these was most likely the first Sultan to possess the diamond – though the actual circumstances of its arrival there might have been far more mundane. In case of one of the "naive fisherman" versions being the right one, the diamond might have arrived much earlier, probably in 1800–1801.

== In film ==
The Spoonmaker's Diamond is the big diamond that is referenced in the film Topkapi, shot in Kavala and Istanbul in 1965 and starring Melina Mercouri and Peter Ustinov. However, the robbers depicted in the film are mainly oriented at stealing another Topkapi treasure, the emerald-encrusted dagger of the earlier Sultan Mahmud I.

== See also ==
- List of diamonds
