= Pigot baronets =

Title in the Baronetage of Great Britain

- Escutcheon of the Pigot baronets of Patshull
- Creation date: 1764
- Status: extant
- Motto: Tout foys prest, At all times ready

The Pigot baronetcy, of Patshull Hall in the County of Stafford, is a title in the Baronetage of Great Britain. It was created on 5 December 1764 for the politician and colonial administrator George Pigot, with special remainder to his brothers General Robert Pigot and Admiral Hugh Pigot.

== Baron Pigot ==
On 19 January 1766 Pigot was raised to the Peerage of Ireland as 'Baron Pigot; with remainder to the heirs male of his body. Lord Pigot was unmarried (although he left several natural children; see below) and on his death in 1777 the barony became extinct.

== Pigot baronets, of Patshull (1764) ==
- George Pigot, 1st Baron Pigot (1719–1777)
- Sir Robert Pigot, 2nd Baronet (1720–1796)
- Sir George Pigot, 3rd Baronet (1766–1841)
- Sir Robert Pigot, 4th Baronet (1801–1891)
- Sir George Pigot, 5th Baronet (1850–1934)
- Sir Robert Pigot, 6th Baronet (1882–1977). He was a Brigadier General and was awarded the Military Cross.
- Sir Robert Anthony Pigot, 7th Baronet (1915–1986). Nephew of the fifth Baronet. He was a major general in the Royal Marines.
- Sir George Hugh Pigot, 8th Baronet (born 1946)

The heir apparent is the present holder's eldest son George Douglas Hugh Pigot (born 1982).

== Extended family ==
- Hugh Pigot (c. 1722–1792) brother of the first Baron and second Baronet, was an Admiral in the Royal Navy.
- Richard Pigot (1774–1868), illegitimate son of the first Baron, was a General in the British Army.
- Sir Hugh Pigot (1775–1857), illegitimate son of the first Baron, was an Admiral of the White.
- Hugh Pigot (1769–1797), a Royal Navy Captain was slain during the mutiny on the Hermione. Nephew of the first Baron.

== Notes ==
Baronetage of Great Britain
Preceded by Lowther baronets	Pigot baronets of Patshull; 5 December 1764	Succeeded by Mildmay baronets
