= William Skrine =

British politician

William Skrine (c. 1721–1783) was a British politician who sat in the House of Commons from 1771 to 1780. He committed suicide after losing heavily at cards.

Skrine was the son of Dr. William Skrine, of Claverton, Somerset and his wife Ann Spurstow, daughter of Henry Spurstow of Cheshire. His father was a physician or apothecary at Bath and thus made many connections with titled families and built up a considerable fortune. Skrine succeeded his father who died when he was aged four on 5 December 1725. He matriculated at St John's College, Oxford on 24 January 1738, aged 16. In 1758, he sold Claverton Manor to Ralph Allen. He married firstly, Jane Sumner on 21 May 1764; she died in 1766. His second wife was Julia Maria Siordet of Piedmont whom he married in about 1776.

Skrine was a close friend of Horace Walpole, and was returned on the Orford interest as Member of Parliament for Callington, after a contest at a by-election on 22 November 1771. He was returned unopposed in 1774. He voted steadily with the Government. His attendance at divisions was good, but there is no indication that he spoke in Parliament. He decided to relinquish his seat in 1780.

Skrine played cards at Brook's. He lost very heavily on 8 March 1783, and shot himself in the head at a tavern in Newgate Street. He appointed Lord Barrington as executor, and as guardian of his children. His daughter Louisa Skrine, who may have been an illegitimate child of Jane Sumner and John Montagu, 4th Earl of Sandwich, married Sir Thomas Clarges, 3rd Baronet in 1777. His other daughter Elizabeth Ann Skrine married Charles Loraine Smith in 1781.

Parliament of Great Britain
Preceded by Thomas Worsley; Fane William Sharpe	Member of Parliament for Callington; 1771–1780; With: Thomas Worsley 1771-1774; John Dyke Acland 1774-1778; George Stratton 1778-1780	Succeeded by George Stratton; John Morshead
