= Listed buildings in Pattingham and Patshull =

Pattingham and Patshull is a civil parish in the district of South Staffordshire, Staffordshire, England. It contains 48 listed buildings that are recorded in the National Heritage List for England. Of these, two are listed at Grade I, the highest of the three grades, six are at Grade II*, the middle grade, and the others are at Grade II, the lowest grade. The parish contains the villages of Pattingham and Burnhill Green and the surrounding area. A large part of the parish is occupied by Patshull Park, the estate of Patshull Hall. The hall is listed, together with associated structures and items in the park. The other listed buildings include houses and cottages, farmhouses and farm buildings, churches and associated structures, including memorials in the churchyard, a public house, a former eel trap, a windmill converted into a house, and a memorial hall.

== Key ==
Grade	Criteria
I	Buildings of exceptional interest, sometimes considered to be internationally important
II*	Particularly important buildings of more than special interest
II	Buildings of national importance and special interest

== Buildings ==
Name and location	Photograph	Date	Notes	Grade
St Chad's Church, Pattingham; 52.58980°N 2.26566°W		12th century	The church was altered and extended in the following centuries and was restored in 1865. It is in stone, the south aisle has a lead roofs, and the other roofs are tiled. The church consists of a nave with a clerestory, north and south aisles, north and south porches, a chancel, and a west steeple embraced by the aisles. The steeple has a three-stage tower with diagonal buttresses, a west doorway and window, an embattled parapet with corner pinnacles, and a recessed spire with a second tier of pinnacles. In the chancel are 13th-century lancet windows, and the south aisle has an embattled parapet.	II*
Churchyard cross 52.58954°N 2.26537°W		15th century (possible)	The cross is in the churchyard of St Chad's Church, it is in stone, and has been restored. There is a wide base on three steps, and an octagonal shaft with a chamfered top. The shaft is carved on each face and carries a later cross.	II
Orchard Cottage and Clive Cottage, Clive Road; 52.57509°N 2.26057°W	—	16th century (possible)	A pair of cottages that were much altered in the 17th and 19th centuries. They have a timber framed core with cruck construction on a stone plinth, the extensions are in brick, and the roof is tiled. There is one storey and an attic, three bays, and a rear extension. The windows are casements, and there are half-dormers with triangular and semicircular gables alternating. In a gable end is exposed timber framing, and internally there is a cruck truss.	II
Birdhouse Cottage, Clive Road; 52.58399°N 2.26113°W		Late 16th or early 17th century	The cottage was later extended. The original part is timber framed, the extensions are in brick, and the roof is tiled. There is one storey and an attic, and three bays. The left bay is timber framed, and the other bays have applied timber framing on brick. On the front is a gabled porch, the windows are casements, and there are three gabled dormers.	II
Grange Farmhouse; 52.59471°N 2.24052°W	—	Early to mid 17th century	The farmhouse was extended in the 18th century. The original part is timber framed with brick infill, the extension is rendered, and the roof is tiled. There are two storeys and an attic, and two parallel ranges. The windows are casements, there is a 20th-century porch, and a conservatory at the rear. Inside, there is exposed timber framing.	II
1 Beckbury Lane; 52.60313°N 2.31273°W	—	17th century	A cottage that was later extended. The original part is timber framed, the extension to the rear is in brick, and the roof is tiled. There is one storey and an attic, and a T-shaped plan, with a front of two bays. The windows are casements.	II
15 Wolverhampton Road and attached building 52.59101°N 2.25920°W	—	17th century	The oldest part is the attached building which is timber framed with infill and partial rebuilding in brick, and with a tile roof. There is one storey and an attic, and four bays. The house to the left dates from the 19th century, and is in red brick with a slate roof, two storeys and two bays. In the ground floor is a bay window with casements, and the other windows are sashes.	II
Nore Hill Farmhouse; 52.59559°N 2.28025°W	—	17th century	The farmhouse was extended in the 19th century. The original part is in sandstone, the extensions are in red brick, and the roof is tiled with raised coped verges. There is a roughly L-shaped plan, the original range with two storeys, and the extension forming a gabled cross-wing with two storeys and an attic. Most of the windows are casements, some with segmental heads, and on the west front are stone mullioned windows.	II
Great Moor House; 52.58294°N 2.24369°W	—	Early to mid 18th century	A farmhouse, later a private house, it is in red brick on a sandstone plinth with a moulded eaves course and a tile roof. There are two storeys, an attic and a cellar, two parallel ranges, five bays, the middle bay projecting slightly, and a single-storey extension to the right. In the centre is a porch, the cellar windows are mullioned, and the other windows are sashes with raised keystones.	II
The Vicarage, Pattingham; 52.58996°N 2.26597°W		Early to mid 18th century	The vicarage is in red brick with giant corner pilasters, a moulded eaves cornice, and a hipped tile roof. There are three storeys, five bays, and a two-storey wing to the right. The windows are sashes with raised keystones.	II
St Mary's Church, Patshull; 52.60341°N 2.29575°W		c. 1743	The church was designed by James Gibbs and was altered in 1874. It is in sandstone with rusticated quoins, a moulded eaves cornice, and a lead roof. It consists of a nave, a north aisle, a chancel, a north vestry, a south porch, and a west tower. The tower has three stages, round-headed bell openings with louvres, Tuscan pilasters and entablature, and is surmounted by a lead-covered cupola. At the east end is a pediment and a Venetian window with Tuscan pilasters, and the windows elsewhere have round heads; above the porch is a circular window.	II*
Patshull Hall and wings 52.60555°N 2.29339°W	—	c. 1750	A country house designed by James Gibbs and later altered and extended, it is in stone with hipped slate roofs, and has a main block of three storeys and a basement. The north, entrance, front has seven bays and flanking projecting two-bay balustraded turrets. The middle three bays project under a pediment and in the centre is a pedimented Doric porch with a round-arched entrance, and decoration in the tympanum. The windows are sashes in moulded architraves, those in the ground floor with cornices, and the forecourt is enclosed by a balustrade. The south, garden, front has seven bays, the middle three bays projecting and containing a verandah, and the sides have five bays. Projecting to the north and enclosing a courtyard are wings consisting of the former coach house and stable. They have two storeys and contain rusticated entrances with pedimented dormers above.	I
Entry to Patshull Hall and walls 52.60596°N 2.29363°W		c. 1750	The entrance feature to the hall was designed by James Gibbs. It is in red sandstone, and has a parapet with ball finials, and a hipped slate roof. There are two storeys and five bays, the middle bay projecting, flanked by Tuscan pilasters, with a pediment containing a clock surmounted by an urn, and above which is a cupola. In the centre is a round-headed archway with a Gibbs surround flanked by niches containing statues of Cavaliers. The outer bays contain sash windows, and to the sides are two-bay screen walls with ball finials.	I
Buildings in outer courtyard, Patshull Hall; 52.60665°N 2.29402°W	—	Mid 18th century	To the north of the outer forecourt are dwarf stone walls with wrought iron railings containing piers with ball ornaments and central iron gates. The side walls each contains a central arch with a raised keystone and a pediment.	II*
Buildings in service courtyard, Patshull Hall; 52.60602°N 2.29426°W	—	Mid 18th century	Flanking the service courtyard to the east and the west are ranges in red brick with hipped tile roofs. They contain casement windows, those in the ground floor with segmental heads, and various doorways. At the entrance to the courtyard are brick walls, and gate piers with stone caps and ball ornaments.	II*
Fountain head, Patshull Hall; 52.60552°N 2.29427°W	—	18th century	The fountain head was moved to its present site in the late 19th or early 20th century. It is hexagonal, in stone, and has a panelled plinth, carved panels, piers and gadrooned capping to the dome. The structure is about 3 feet (0.91 m) wide, and was about 5 feet (1.5 m) high.	II
Hack Cottage, Patshull Hall; 52.60584°N 2.29475°W	—	Mid 18th century	The house is in red brick on a sandstone plinth with a hipped tile roof. There are two storeys and an attic, four bays, and a later low extension on the right. The house contains two pairs of double doors with stone surrounds, casement windows, and two flat-roofed dormers.	II
Wall, gate piers and gates, Hack Cottage, Patshull Hall; 52.60568°N 2.29457°W	—	18th century	The wall and gate piers are in stone. The piers are squat, with a square section and ball ornaments. The wall has moulded coping, and the gates are in cast iron.	II
Orangery and stables, Patshull Hall; 52.60647°N 2.29490°W	—	18th century	The former orangery and stables have been concerted for residential use. They are in red brick on a sandstone plinth and have hipped slate roofs, and are in four ranges around a courtyard. The orangery has one storey and an attic, and a main block of three bays, flanked by lower wings with three bays each. There are three large segmental arched windows in each bay of the wings and in the centre of the main block, the latter flanked by doors, and in the attic are semicircular dormers. The stables have two storeys and contain casement windows, some with segmental heads. air vents, and doorways.	II
Steps and wall, bowling green, Patshull Hall; 52.60562°N 2.29247°W	—	18th century	The steps and retaining walls surrounding the former bowling green are in stone. On the steps are ball ornaments.	II
Terraces and steps, Patshull Hall; 52.60532°N 2.29324°W	—	Mid 18th century	The principal terrace is to the south of the hall, and there are lower terraces to the east and the west, with steps leading to them. The stone retaining walls of the lower terraces have urn ornaments, and the balustraded steps and walls of the principal terrace have vase ornaments.	II*
Churchyard wall, gates and gate piers, St Mary's Church; 52.60311°N 2.29589°W	—	18th century	The churchyard walls and gate piers are in stone, and the gates are in wrought iron. There are gate piers to the south and the northeast of the churchyard; each pier is square in section, and is surmounted by a ball ornament on a moulded pedestal.	II
Gate piers and gates northeast of St Mary's Church; 52.60355°N 2.29550°W	—	18th century	The gate piers are in stone and each has a chamfered projecting base, and a cap with a ball ornament. The gates are in wrought iron and have scroll work and foliage decoration.	II
Wildicote Bridge, Patshull Park; 52.60662°N 2.28712°W		Mid 18th century	The bridge carries a road over a stream in Patshull Park, and is in stone and brick. It consists of a single semicircular arch, with a moulded surround, and a raised keystone. Above the arch is a cornice with a balustraded parapet, and the abutments are returned to the outside.	II
Barn and stable block, Great Moor House; 52.58323°N 2.24405°W	—	Mid 18th century	The barn is in red brick on a sandstone plinth and has a tile roof, one storey and six bays. It contains casement windows, doorways and air vents. The stable block to the right is in brick and has a hipped roof.	II
The Court House, Patshull Road; 52.59064°N 2.26611°W	—	Mid 18th century	A red brick house on a sandstone plinth, with a moulded and corbelled cornice and a tile roof. There are two storeys and an attic, and three bays. The windows are sashes with raised keystones. and the doorway is at the rear.	II
The Temple, Patshull Park; 52.59455°N 2.29567°W		Mid to late 18th century	A garden feature, altered in the 20th century and used for other purposes, it is in red brick and stone and has a slate roof. At the front is a Doric portico with a pediment and 20th-century glass doors.	II*
69 Clive Road, walls, railings and gate 52.58565°N 2.26145°W	—	Late 18th century	A red brick house with a floor band, dentilled eaves and a tile roof. There are two storeys, five bays, and a low outbuilding to the left. The doorway, to the right, has a simple latticework porch. The windows in the ground floor are sashes, and in the upper floor they are casements, all with segmental heads. Enclosing the front garden is a dwarf wall with cast iron railings and gates.	II
Farm buildings north of 69 Clive Road; 52.58580°N 2.26132°W	—	Late 18th century	The farm buildings are in red brick with dentilled eaves and tile roofs, and they have an L-shaped plan. The barn has a gabled wing, and contains air vents and double doors, and on the front is an open-fronted shed.	II
Cascade and remains of eel trap and house 52.58940°N 2.29714°W	—	Late 18th century (probable)	The cascade is hewn out of sandstone, and has a course and walls also in sandstone. The eel traps include two sandstone arches with red brick voussoirs. What remains of the house consists of a rectangular shell that is at most 2 metres (6 ft 7 in) in height.	II
Gate, gate piers and wall east of St Mary's Church; 52.60327°N 2.29559°W	—	18th or early 19th century	The gate piers are in stone, and are cylindrical on square bases. Each pier has a cabled string course and a cornice with armorial bearings. On the top is a cast iron coronet with floral decoration surrounding a stone cockerel. Between them are double decorated iron gates and iron gates posts linked to the piers by short lengths of railings. The L-shaped stone wall has ball ornaments, and is about 3 feet (0.91 m) high and 5 yards (4.6 m) long.	II
The Retreat, wall, railings and gates, 11 Clive Road; 52.58896°N 2.26228°W		c. 1800	A red brick house with dentilled eaves and a hipped tile roof. There are three storeys and three bays. The central doorway has fluted pilasters, a semicircular fanlight, and an open pediment. The windows in the ground floor are sashes, the upper floors contain casement windows, and all have segmental heads and raised fluted keystones. Across the front of the house is a wrought iron lattice-work veranda with a hipped slate roof, and the front garden is enclosed by a stone coped wall with iron railings and a gate.	II
John Matthews Memorial; 52.58981°N 2.26599°W	—	1814	The memorial is in the churchyard of St Chad's Church, and is to the memory of John Matthews. It is a chest tomb in stone and has a moulded base and cornice, and the long sides have a large central panel with fluted fans in the corners.	II
Edward Offley Memorial; 52.58986°N 2.26596°W	—	1816	The memorial is in the churchyard of St Chad's Church, and is to the memory of Edward Offley. It is a chest tomb in stone and has a moulded base and cornice, moulded pilasters in the centre and to each corner with fluted caps, a frieze with triglyphs, and two oval panels within oblongs with quadrant corners on the long sides.	II
Boathouse north of The Temple; 52.59481°N 2.29523°W	—	Early 19th century	The boathouse is in brick and stone. It consists of a vaulted tunnel with a semicircular section.	II
Burnhill Green House; 52.60240°N 2.31185°W	—	Early 19th century	A farmhouse in red brick that has a tile roof with embattled verges. There are two storeys and an attic, and three bays, the middle bay projecting with an embattled parapet and a round window in the attic. The doorway has a flat hood on brackets, and the windows are sashes.	II
Highgate House, 13 Wolverhampton Road; 52.59089°N 2.25948°W	—	Early 19th century	A red brick house with a tile roof, two storeys and three bays. In the centre is a porch, the windows are casements, and the window above the porch is blind.	II
Ivy House, 34 Wolverhampton Road; 52.59036°N 2.26030°W	—	Early 19th century	A red brick house with a tile roof, two storeys and three bays. In the centre is a doorway with pilasters, a semicircular fanlight and a pediment. The windows are sashes with shaped lintels containing imitation fluted keystones.	II
Pattingham House, railings and gate, 3 High Street; 52.58918°N 2.26349°W	—	Early 19th century	A red brick house with an eaves cornice and a hipped slate roof. There are two storeys, three bays, and a single-storey wing to the left. The central doorway has Doric columns, a semicircular fanlight, and an open pediment. The windows in the main block are sashes with hoods on brackets, and in the wing they are casements. To the north of the front garden are iron railings, and to the east and west are stone coped brick walls with ball ornaments.	II
The Pigot Arms, 11 High Street; 52.58908°N 2.26498°W		Early 19th century	The public house is in red brick on a painted sandstone plinth, and has a tile roof. There are two storeys, the main block has five bays, the middle bay projecting slightly under a pediment, and to the left is a slightly angled two-bay stuccoed wing. The main block has a central doorway, and the windows are sashes, all with painted shaped lintels. The wing has a dentilled eaves course, a doorway to the right, and casement windows.	II
The Poplars, wall, railings and gate, 1 High Street; 52.58929°N 2.26316°W	—	Early 19th century	A red brick house with a tile roof, two storeys, and three bays. The central doorway has Tuscan columns, a semicircular fanlight, and an open pediment. The windows are sashes with shaped lintels and fluted keystones. The front garden is enclosed by a stone coped dwarf wall with cast iron railings and a gate.	II
The West House, Clive Road; 52.58662°N 2.26166°W	—	Early 19th century	A red brick house with dentilled eaves and a clay roof. There are two storeys, three bays, and a low extension to the left. The windows are sashes with moulded surrounds and shaped plaster lintels. The doorway is in the gable end.	II
Bay House, walls, railings and gate, 12 High Street; 52.58831°N 2.26657°W	—	1833	A red brick house with a tile roof, two storeys, three bays, and a one-bay recessed wing to the left. In the centre is a doorway with pilasters, a semicircular fanlight, and a pediment. The windows are sashes in moulded surrounds, those in the ground floor with shaped lintels. Enclosing the front garden is a dwarf wall with cast iron railings and a gate.	II
Boathouse south of St Mary's Church; 52.60040°N 2.29632°W	—	Mid 19th century	The boathouse is in stone and has a pyramidal tile roof and a square plan. There is a central round-headed door over which is a small gable.	II
Boathouse west of St Mary's Church; 52.60335°N 2.29699°W	—	Mid 19th century	The boathouse is in stone and has a slate roof. In the north gable end is a round-headed doorway, flanked by two small windows.	II
The Mill House; 52.59622°N 2.24376°W	—	19th century	A windmill that was remodelled, extended, and converted into a house in the 20th century. It is rendered and has a slate roof. The former windmill has a circular plan and three storeys, and the extension has two storeys. The windows are casements, and there are also bay windows.	II
Memorial Hall, Burnhill Green; 52.60306°N 2.31136°W		1903	The hall is in red brick with timber framing in the gables, and a tile roof. The hall has a single storey, and the former caretaker's accommodation has two storeys. The front facing the road has a canted bay window under a gable containing an inscribed plaque. The west front has four bays with casement windows, and two gabled dormers. On the roof is a louvred cupola.	II
Fountain and basin, Patshull Hall; 52.60531°N 2.29389°W	—	Undated	The ornamental fountain stands in a circular pool of rendered brick with stone coping. It is in cast iron and consists of a central urn surmounted by a shallow bowl with busts around the sides. The fountain is surrounded by four youths holding tortoises, four dolphins and four large shells.	II
