= Patshull =

Former civil parish in Staffordshire, England

Coordinates: 52.6058°N 2.2935°W

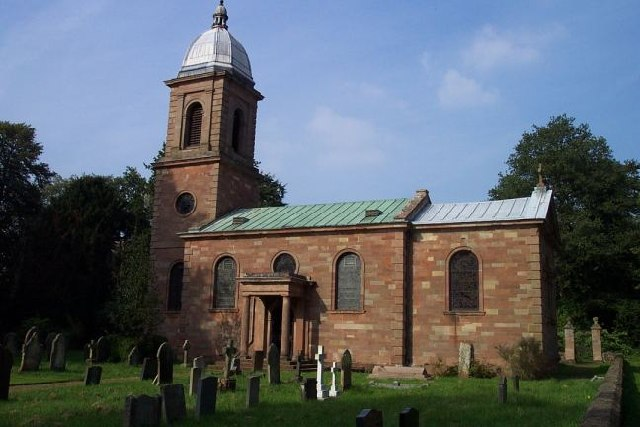
- St. Mary's Church

- Location within Staffordshire
- Population: 212 (2011 Census)
- OS grid reference: SJ800006
- Civil parish: Pattingham and Patshull
- District: South Staffordshire
- Shire county: Staffordshire
- Region: West Midlands
- Country: England
- Sovereign state: United Kingdom
- Post town: Wolverhampton
- Postcode district: WV6
- Dialling code: 01902
- Police: Staffordshire
- Fire: Staffordshire
- Ambulance: West Midlands

Patshull is a former civil parish, now in the parish of Pattingham and Patshull, in the South Staffordshire district, in the county of Staffordshire, England. It is seven miles west of Wolverhampton and 7½ miles east of Bridgnorth. According to the 2011 census, it had a population of 212. The parish consisted of Patshull, Burnhill Green and, along its eastern boundary, Westbeech (old name Westbach). It formerly contained several farmhouses and small cottages, but Burnhill Green is the main hamlet.

== History ==
Parish of Patshull, 1899 Mauve: parishes in ShropshireYellow: parish of Tettenhall Green: parish of Pattingham

Patshull, which was anciently called Peccleshala, occupies a salient of Staffordshire projecting into Shropshire. Area 1,850 acres. The parish contains Patshull Hall, which was set in a park of 341 acres. The settlements are of small extent. The ground in the parish is level and generally fertile. It contains two lakes, called Patshull and Snowdon Pools, the latter, which has a serpentine shape, adorning the front of the mansion of Patshull Hall.

In 1961, the civil parish had a population of 154. On 1 April 1986, the parish was abolished and merged with Pattingham to form "Pattingham and Patshull". The new parish of Pattingham and Patshull was divided into two parish wards of Patshull and Pattingham, each consisting of the area of the identically named parish as previously constituted. Patshull was only allocated two parish councillors out of 11 in total.

The ecclesiastical parishes have likewise been amalgamated.

Patshull Church, dedicated to St. Mary, was built by Sir John Astley around 1743, and is situated in the park.

Patshull Hall is a mid-18th century Baroque house whose estate was landscaped by Capability Brown, built by Astley around same time as the church. It was later the Staffordshire seat of the Earls of Dartmouth. A hotel is situated in the grounds of the Hall and features a golf course and trout fishing lakes. Both the hotel and the golf course are now closed to the public.

The parish was in the South division of Seisdon Hundred.
