= Sir Robert Pigot, 6th Baronet =

British Army and later Royal Air Force officer

- Born: Robert Pigot; 3 May 1882; Cobham, England
- Died: 27 December 1977 (aged 95); Yeovil, England
- Military career
- Allegiance: United Kingdom
- Branch: British Army; Royal Air Force
- Service years: –
- Rank: Brigadier General

Sir Robert Pigot, 6th Baronet DSO MC (3 May 1882 – 27 December 1977) was a British Army and later Royal Air Force officer who served in both world wars.

== Early life ==
He was the son of Sir George Pigot, 5th Baronet and his wife Alice, daughter of Sir James Thompson Mackenzie, 1st Baronet. He became the sixth Baronet on the death of his father in 1934.

== Military service ==
He served with the Rifle Brigade until he joined the Royal Flying Corps as adjutant from 1913-14. He was awarded the Distinguished Service Order (DSO) and Military Cross (MC) in the First World War.

In the second world war he served with the RAF Volunteer Reserve, resigning his commission as a wing commander in 1944.

== Family life ==
Pigot married in 1913 to Norah Hargraves and they had three daughters. He died on 27 December 1977 at Yeovil in Somerset.

Baronetage of Great Britain
Preceded by George Pigot	Baronet (of Patshull); 1934–1977	Succeeded by Robert Pigot
