= George Stratton (politician) =

British East India Company official & politician (1734–1800)

Governor of Madras
- In office 23 August 1776 – 31 August 1777
- Preceded by: George Pigot
- Succeeded by: John Whitehill

Personal details
- Born: 1734
- Died: 20 March 1800 (aged 65–66)
- Spouse: Hester Eleanora
- Children: George Frederick Stratton; John

George Stratton (c. 1734–1800) was an East India Company official and politician who sat in the House of Commons between 1778 and 1784.

== Early life ==
Stratton was the eldest son of John Stratton and his wife Mary Houghton. His father was an official in the East India Company and served on the council of Madras. Stratton followed his father into the service of the East India Company and was appointed a writer on 31 Oct. 1750. He went to Fort St. George in 1751. In 1768 he married Hester Eleanora Light who had travelled out to India as cabin companion of Eliza Draper. Also in 1768 he became a member of the Governor's council at Madras.

== Controversy ==
Stratton found himself thrown into the limelight by a conflict that arose between the council and the Governor of Madras. Lord Pigot had been governor at Fort St George from 1755 to 1762 when he had been demonstrably autocratic. In the early 1770s Pigot was in dispute with his superiors at the East India Company and the government, and being in financial difficulties wanted to return to India. He was appointed Governor of Madras again in 1775, and caused anger by announcing the restoration of the Raja of Tanjore, in direct contravention of a previous treaty which favoured the Nawab of Arcot. As the council were committed to the Nawab a violent dispute arose. Pigot tried to suspend the council, but the council in return arrested and imprisoned Pigot. Stratton and Sir Robert Fletcher were leaders in the council and Stratton became acting Governor from 23 August 1776 to 31 August 1777, while waiting for instructions from the company. Pigot then died in captivity on 11 May 1777: Stratton and his colleagues were accused of murder. The proceedings were dismissed but the officials were ordered back to England in 1778 by the general court of the East India Company.

== Parliamentary career ==
Stratton sought the help of Lord Sandwich to find a seat in Parliament. He was returned as Member of Parliament for Callington after a contest at a by-election on 5 December 1778. He was unseated on 15 February 1779, but re-elected on 1 March.

On 16 April Admiral Hugh Pigot, the former governor's brother, moved that the House should ask for an official prosecution. Stratton responded that the council had only acted "upon the most pressing necessity and that Lord Pigot’s behaviour was in the highest degree tyrannical and arbitrary" Pigot's resolution was passed by the House. Stratton and his associates were tried before the court of King's bench and were fined £1,000 each in February 1780. In the 1780 general election Stratton was again returned at Callington but unopposed. In 1781 the English Chronicle wrote of Stratton "All his fortune, which is now very considerable, has been acquired in the service of the East India Company, and except in the part he took in the revolution at Madras, few men have emerged into sudden consequence with less noise, and, what is better, with less cause for serious imputation than himself." Stratton continued to support the Administration in Parliament. He did not stand again at the 1784 general election.

== Later life and legacy ==
Stratton died on 20 March 1800, aged 65.

== Family ==
With his wife Hester Eleanora, Stratton had two surviving sons and a daughter. The sons were George Frederick Stratton and John. The daughter, Wilhelmina Sarah (died 1849), married Egerton Leigh (1779–1865) and was mother of Egerton Leigh the politician.

Political offices
Preceded by Lord Pigot	Governor of Madras; 1776–1777	Succeeded by John Whitehill
Parliament of Great Britain
Preceded by John Dyke Acland; William Skrine	Member of Parliament for Callington; 1778–1784; With: William Skrine 1778-1780; John Morshead 1780-1784	Succeeded by Sir John Call; Paul Orchard
