= Sir Robert Pigot, 7th Baronet =

Major-General Sir Robert Anthony Pigot, 7th Baronet, CB, OBE, DL (6 July 1915 – 29 November 1986) was a Royal Marines officer. Son of George Douglas Hugh Pigot (2 August 1883 – 26 May 1959) and Hersey Elizabeth Maltby. He was educated at Stowe. He was commissioned into the RM in 1934 and served during the Second World War, and afterwards.

His first marriage was on 7 October 1942 to Honor Amilia Gibbon (18 July 1915 – 26 November 1966), daughter of Captain Wilfred St Martin Gibbon. They had 2 children. Louise, born 21 July 1943, who married Peter Mellor of Newton, IOW. George Hugh, (8th Baronet) born 28 November 1946.

He was appointed OBE in 1959 and CB in the 1964 New Year Honours. He succeeded his uncle as 7th Baronet in 1977.

In 1968, he married secondly, Sarah Anne Colville. The couple lived at Bembridge. They had 2 children, Robert and Sophie.

Baronetage of Great Britain
| Preceded by Robert Pigot | Baronet (of Patshull); 1977–1986 | Succeeded by George Pigot |
