= 130th Regiment of Foot =

Infantry regiment of the British Army

130th Regiment of Foot (Loyal Staffordshire Volunteers)
- Active: 1794–1796
- Disbanded: 1796
- Country: Great Britain
- Branch: British Army
- Type: Infantry
- Role: Line infantry

Commanders
- Notable commanders: George Pigot

The 130th Regiment of Foot was an infantry regiment of the British Army, created in 1794. After being raised it was sent to the West Indies, where it suffered heavy losses from tropical disease. The unit was disbanded at Santo Domingo in 1796, with the survivors drafted into other regiments.

== Background ==
The 130th Regiment of Foot was raised as part of a rapid expansion of the British Army from 1793 as a reaction to the French Revolutionary Wars, which had begun in 1792. More than 40 regiments of foot and cavalry were added to the establishment; many of these units were short lived. British Army regiments are given a number, according to the seniority in which they were raised, but the numbering of these units is somewhat erratic. The supposedly junior 131st Regiment of Foot was accepted onto the Army List a full 18 months before the 130th Regiment. This probably represents differences in the speed of recruitment to individual regiments (units were not accepted onto the list until they had reached a certain "establishment" strength). The naming of the new units is also varied. Some were granted formal names but others were known by their commander's names or by number alone. Most of the new regiments disbanded by 1797.

== History ==
In 1794 Captain George Pigot, formerly of the 38th Regiment of Foot was promised promotion to lieutenant-colonel—and command of the new 130th Regiment of Foot if he could recruit the men to establish the unit. The 130th Regiment of Foot was formed at Wolverhampton, Staffordshire, in 1794 and was titled the "Loyal Staffordshire Volunteers". It was also known as "Pigot's" or "Meyrick's" Regiment. Pigot was appointed to command the 130th Regiment on 21 March 1795 and the unit was entered onto the Army List on 12 June.

The 130th Regiment was posted to the West Indies in 1795, at a time when the British were fighting the Second Maroon War against the revolt of the Jamaican Maroons. The unit suffered badly from tropical disease. It numbered 166 fit men at Santo Domingo in November but by December numbered only 7 men fit and 11 sick. The regiment was disbanded at Santo Domingo in 1796 by drafting the survivors into other units. Shoulder belt plates bearing the insignia of the Stafford Knot and the inscription "Loyal Staffordshire Volunteers" found in Dominica and Haiti and sometimes identified as belonging to the 80th Regiment of Foot (Staffordshire Volunteers), are instead probably associated with the 130th Regiment. Colonel Pigot was placed on half pay and afterwards rose, by a series of brevet promotions, to the rank of general.
