= Sir John Gibbons, 2nd Baronet =

Sir John Gibbons, 2nd Baronet (c.1717 – 9 July 1776) was a British Member of Parliament.

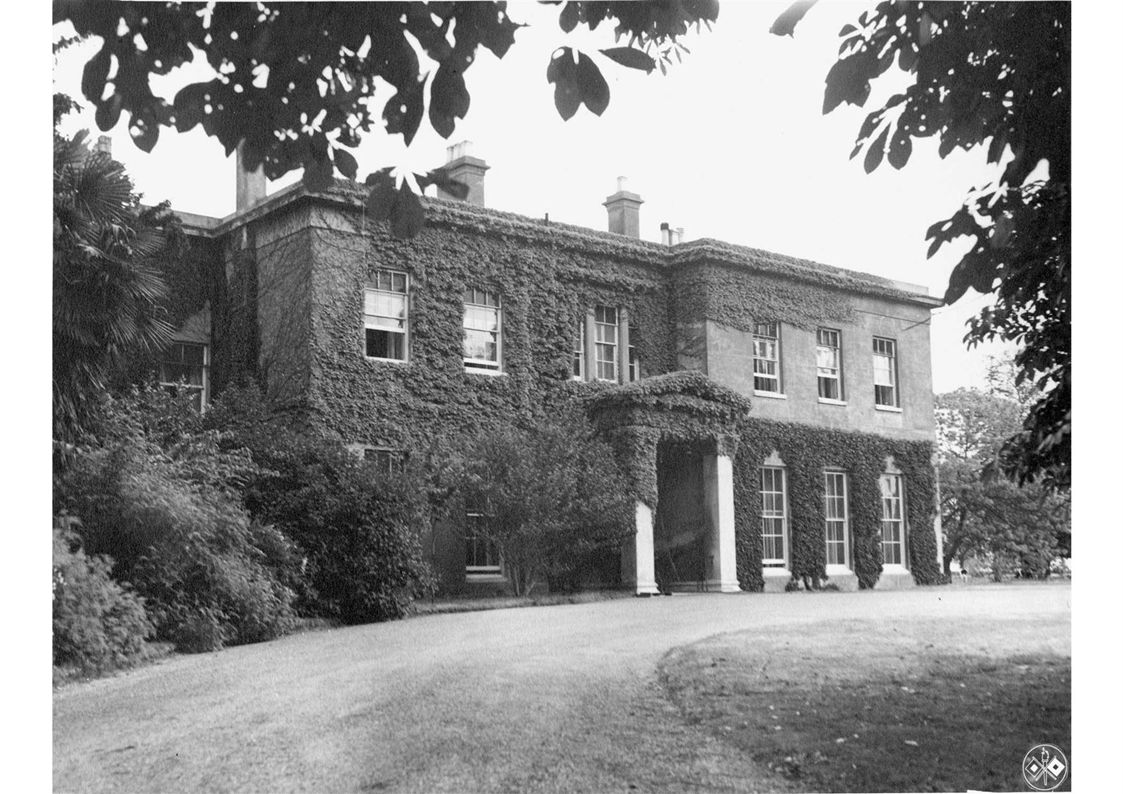
Stanwell Place

Gibbons was born in Barbados, the son of Sir William Gibbons, 1st Baronet, speaker of the assembly and lieutenant-general of Barbados.

He represented Stockbridge (1754–1761) and Wallingford (1761–1768) in the House of Commons, whilst at the same time being a member of the Barbados assembly. On his father's death in May 1760, he succeeded to the title of 2nd Baronet. He acquired and lived in Stanwell Place, Middlesex, which then passed down in the Gibbons family to 1933.

In 1761 he was invested as a Knight Companion (KB) of the Order of the Bath .

He married Martha, the daughter of Rev. Scawen Kenrick, vicar of St. Margaret's, Westminster, and had 5 sons and a daughter. He was succeeded by his eldest son, Sir William Gibbons, 3rd Baronet. The daughter, Emily Gibbons, married Gerald FitzGerald on 9 November 1820. That marriage produced his grandson, Gerard George Fitzgerald.

Baronetage of Great Britain
Preceded by William Gibbons	Baronet (of Stanwell Place); 1760–1776	Succeeded by William Gibbons
