= George Willison (artist) =

Scottish portrait-painter

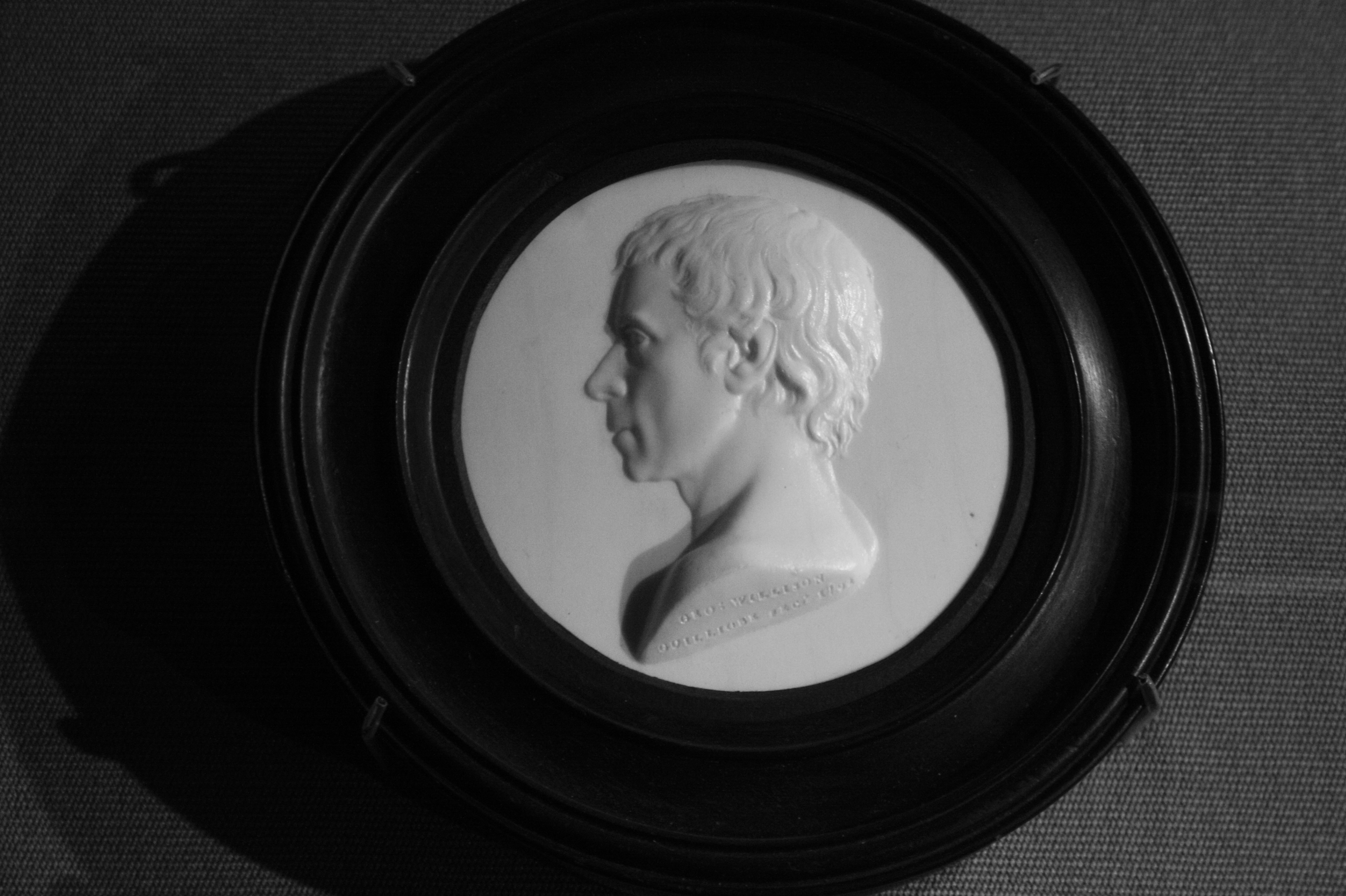
Cameo of George Willison 1792

George Willison (1741– 13 April 1797) was a Scottish portrait-painter. He is best known for his works done in India.

== Life ==
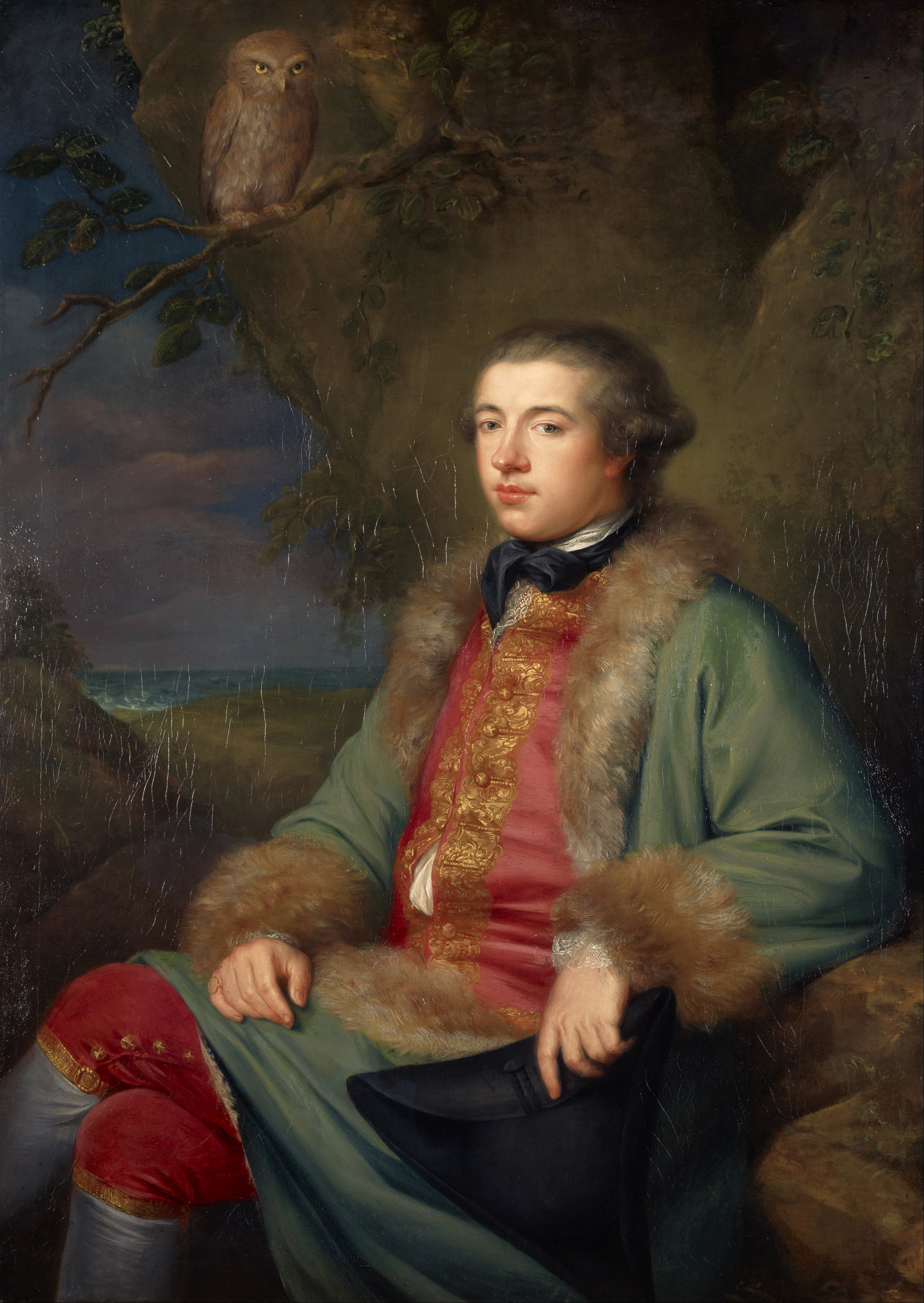
James Boswell by George Willison 1765 Scottish National Gallery.

He was a son of David Willison, an Edinburgh printer and publisher, and grandson of John Willison. His uncle George Dempster of Dunnichen sent him to Rome to study art. There from 1760 to 1767, he worked initially under Raphael Mengs. On his return he settled in London.

Willison went to India and painted portraits, including those of some Indian princes and their families. He returned to Edinburgh, having acquired a large fortune in jewels. There he continued to paint, and died in April 1797.

== Works ==
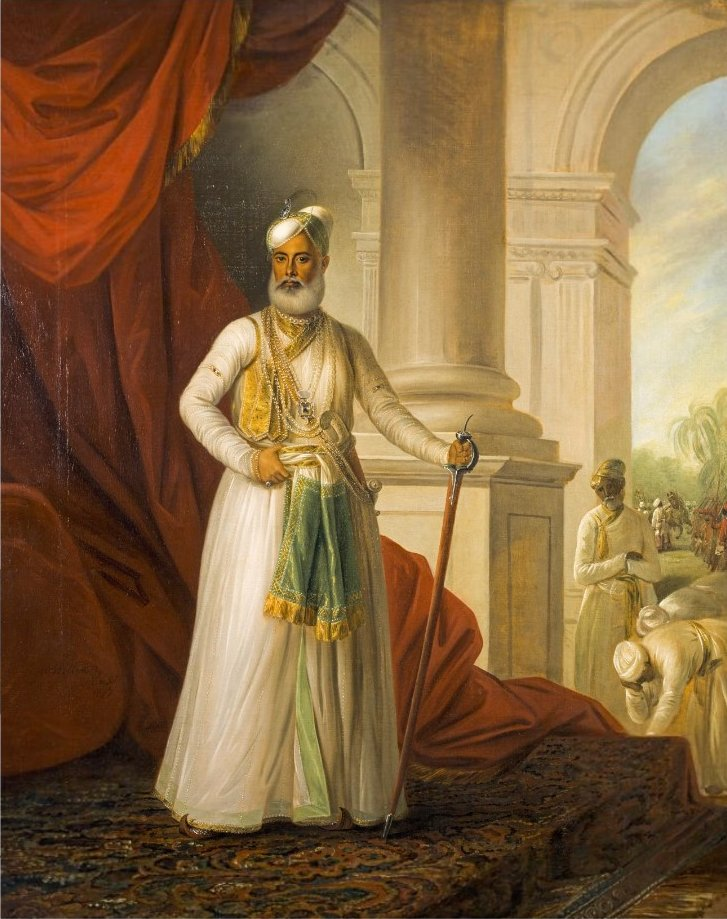
Muhammed Ali Khan Wallajah, the Nawab of the Carnatic, portrait by George Willison

In 1756 Willison was awarded a prize for a drawing of flowers by the Edinburgh Society for the Encouragement of the Arts and Sciences, and in the two following years his name again figured in the prize-list. Between 1767 and 1777, he exhibited about 25 portraits at the Royal Academy.

In India he painted officials of the East India Company. He spent an extended period at the court of the Nawab of Arcot. There he produced a series of portraits that were destined for the British political supporters of the Nawab. He also worked for the Nawab's rival the Raja of Tanjore.

A number of Willison's portraits were engraved by Valentine Green and James Watson.
