= 130th Ohio Infantry Regiment =

- Active: May 13, 1864, to September 22, 1864
- Country: United States
- Allegiance: Union
- Branch: Infantry

The 130th Ohio Infantry Regiment, sometimes 130th Ohio Volunteer Infantry (or 130th OVI) was an infantry regiment in the Union Army during the American Civil War. It was originally organized as the 1st Ohio National Guard.

== Service ==
The 130th Ohio Infantry was organized in Sandusky, Ohio, and mustered in May 13, 1864, for 100 days service under the command of Colonel Charles B. Phillips.

The regiment was attached to 2nd Brigade, 3rd Division, X Corps, Army of the James.

The 130th Ohio Infantry mustered out of service at Toledo, Ohio, on September 22, 1864.

== Detailed service ==
Performed guard duty at Johnson's Island, Sandusky Bay, until June 4. It then moved to Washington, D.C., June 4 and to Bermuda Hundred, Virginia, June 8. Picket duty at Bermuda Hundred and at Point of Rocks until June 21. March to Deep Bottom June 21, and duty there until August 11. Duty in lines at Bermuda Hundred and at Fort Powhatan August 11 to September 16, 1864.

== Ohio National Guard ==
Over 35,000 Ohio National Guardsmen were federalized and organized into regiments for 100 days service in May 1864. Shipped to the Eastern Theater, they were designed to be placed in "safe" rear areas to protect railroads and supply points, thereby freeing regular troops for Lt. Gen. Ulysses S. Grant’s push on the Confederate capital of Richmond, Virginia. As events transpired, many units found themselves in combat, stationed in the path of Confederate Gen. Jubal Early’s veteran Army of the Valley during its famed Valley Campaigns of 1864. Ohio Guard units met the battle-tested foe head on and helped blunt the Confederate offensive thereby saving Washington, D.C. from capture. Ohio National Guard units participated in the battles of Monacacy, Fort Stevens, Harpers Ferry, and in the siege of Petersburg.

== Casualties ==
The regiment lost 23 men during service; 1 officer and 22 enlisted men, all due to disease.

== Commanders ==
- Colonel Charles B. Phillips

== Notable members ==
- Private Livingston Hopkins, Company C - cartoonist who became a major Australian cartoonist during the time of the Federation of Australia

== See also ==
- List of Ohio Civil War units
- Ohio in the Civil War
