= Pattingham =

Village in Staffordshire, England

Coordinates: 52.58964°N 2.26291°W

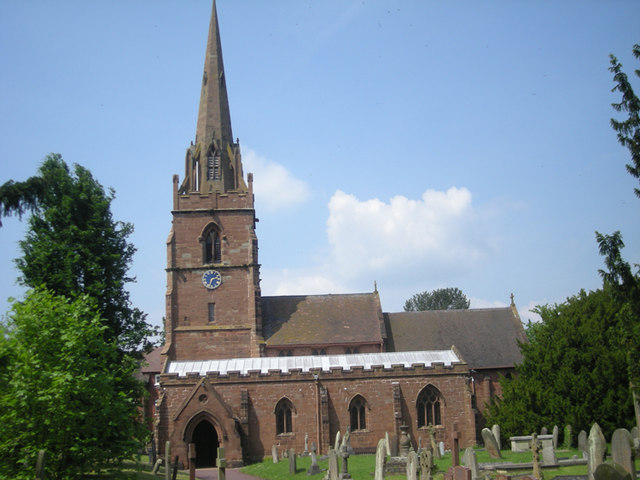
- St Chad's parish church

- Location within Staffordshire
- Area: 0.5500 km^{2} (0.2124 sq mi)
- Population: 1,773 (2021 census)
  - Density: 3,224/km^{2} (8,350/sq mi)
- OS grid reference: SO822991
- Civil parish: Pattingham and Patshull
- District: South Staffordshire
- Shire county: Staffordshire
- Region: West Midlands
- Country: England
- Sovereign state: United Kingdom
- Post town: Wolverhampton
- Postcode district: WV6
- Dialling code: 01902
- Police: Staffordshire
- Fire: Staffordshire
- Ambulance: West Midlands

Pattingham is a village and former civil parish, now in the parish of Pattingham and Patshull, in the South Staffordshire district, in the county of Staffordshire, England, near the county boundary with Shropshire. Pattingham is seven miles west of Wolverhampton and seven and a half miles east of Bridgnorth. In 2021 it had a population of 1773.

== Description ==
Pattingham was originally a farming community but expanded housing in the mid- to late-20th century has led to it becoming a dormitory village for West Midlands conurbation.

The village centre has a parish church and primary school (both St Chad's), a village hall, and several shops. It has also two public houses and a working men's club.

The oldest extant portion of St Chad's Church dates from the late 12th century. The church was rebuilt in the mid-17th century following a devastating fire. George Gilbert Scott extensively remodelled the church in the late 19th century.

Pattingham House was designed by William Baker of Audlem around 1760, and was formerly known as The Torque House after an Iron Age gold torc which was discovered in the grounds.

A mile outside Pattingham is Rudge Hall, a Grade II listed house, which belonged to the Wight-Boycott family during the 19th century.

Many of the more modern houses in the village were designed by Richard Hughes, a late 19th-century architect who was inspired by the works of Thomas Telford and William Morris.

The village is served by National Express bus service 10A which operates approximately every 30 minutes to Perton and Wolverhampton Mon-Fri while Arriva Midlands operates the bus service 9 along Bridgnorth Road (A454) approximately hourly between Bridgnorth and Wolverhampton via Compton Monday-Saturday.

One Interesting fact about the village is that it is rumoured that the creator of the animal excrement disposal container (dog faeces bag), Clive Bookman, came up with the invention after walking through the village's park and noticing the excess excrement, whilst out walking his elderly mother.

In 1961 the parish had a population of 1382. On 1 April 1986 the parish was abolished and merged with Patshull to form "Pattingham and Patshull".

== Schools ==
- St Chad's C. of E. (C) First School

== See also ==
- Listed buildings in Pattingham and Patshull
