= Patshull Hall =

Grade I listed building in South Staffordshire, United Kingdom

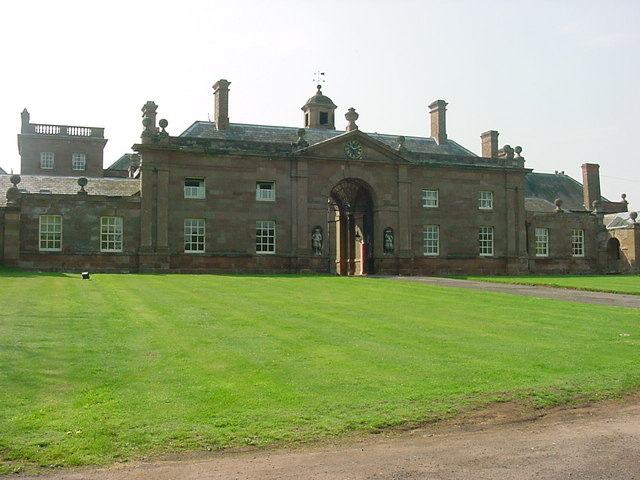
- Triumphal Entry to Forecourt, Patshull Hall - Burnhill Green, Nr Pattingham.

- Location within Staffordshire
- 52°36′21″N 2°17′37″W
- Location: Staffordshire, England
- OS grid reference: SJ8023000902

History
- Built: 1730
- Built for: Sir John Astley

Site notes
- Architect: James Gibbs
- Architectural style: Georgian
- Restored: 1997
- Restored by: Neil Avery

Listed Building – Grade I
- Designated: 1953
- Reference no.: 1039327

Patshull Hall is a substantial Georgian mansion house situated near Pattingham in Staffordshire, England. It is a Grade I listed building and by repute is one of the largest listed buildings in the county.

== History ==
The Hall was built to designs by architect James Gibbs for Sir John Astley in about 1730. The main façade is of three storeys with seven bays, three of which are pedimented, and tower wings. The west wing, of monolithic proportions, has four storeys. The house was set in a park of some 340 acres (1.4 km^{2}) created by Capability Brown and including a large serpentine lake.

The estate was acquired for £100,000 in 1765 by Sir George Pigot, ( Baron Pigot from 1766), on his retirement as Governor of Madras. The Pigot family sold the property to William Legge, 5th Earl of Dartmouth in 1848, whose son and heir Viscount Lewisham took residence. Substantial extensions and improvements were carried out for him by architect William Burn in the 1880s. The Legges later moved their seat to Plas Newydd on Anglesey.

During the 20th century the house served as a rehabilitation centre in the 1940s and then until the 1980s as an orthopaedic hospital. In 1990 the estate was broken up and many acres were sold for the creation of a golf course; a classical temple created by Capability Brown was converted to become the clubhouse.

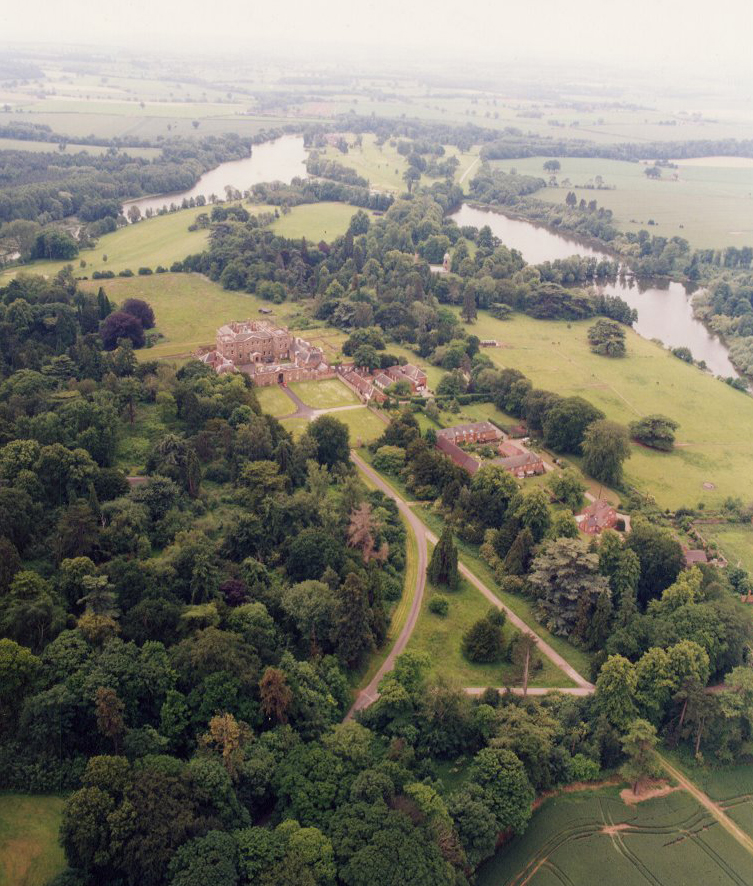

During the 1990s the house fell into disrepair and was briefly used as a school. In 1996 the house had suffered extensive decay and had deteriorated so badly that it appeared on the English heritage list of Buildings at Risk.

Patshull Hall was bought in 1997 by Neil Avery, a renovation specialist and entrepreneur, as a restoration project and the house was subsequently removed from the Buildings at Risk register. The Hall was later purchased in 2015. The house is being further renovated and is now used as a private family home.

== See also ==
- List of Grade I listed buildings in Staffordshire
- Listed buildings in Pattingham and Patshull
