= Naish =

Naish is a surname. Notable people with the surname include:

- Darren Naish (born 1976), British palaeontologist and science writer
- Frances Charlotte Naish (1908–1959), British physician who pioneered aspects of infant health research
- James Naish, British Labour politician and Member of Parliament for Rushcliffe
- John Naish (shipbuilder) (died 1726), English shipbuilder to the Royal Navy
- John Naish (judge) (1841–1890), Irish lawyer and judge, Lord Chancellor of Ireland
- John Naish (writer) (1923–1963), Australian writer and playwright
- J. Carrol Naish (1897–1973), American actor
- Robby Naish windsurfer and kitesurfer, also Naish kites, sails and boards
- William Naish (artist) (1766/7–1800), English miniature painter
- William Naish (Quaker) (1785–1860), English Quaker writer and abolitionist

== See also ==
- Naish District, Afghanistan
- Naish languages, a lower-level language subgroup within the Sino-Tibetan family of languages
