= John Naish =

John Naish may refer to:

- John Naish (judge) (1841–1890), Irish lawyer and judge
- John Naish (shipbuilder) (d. 1726), English shipbuilder
- John Naish (writer) (1923–1963), Australian writer
