= William Naish =

William Naish may refer to:

- William Naish (Quaker)
- William Naish (painter)

== See also ==
- William Nash (disambiguation)
