= HMS York (1753) =

Ship of the line of the Royal Navy

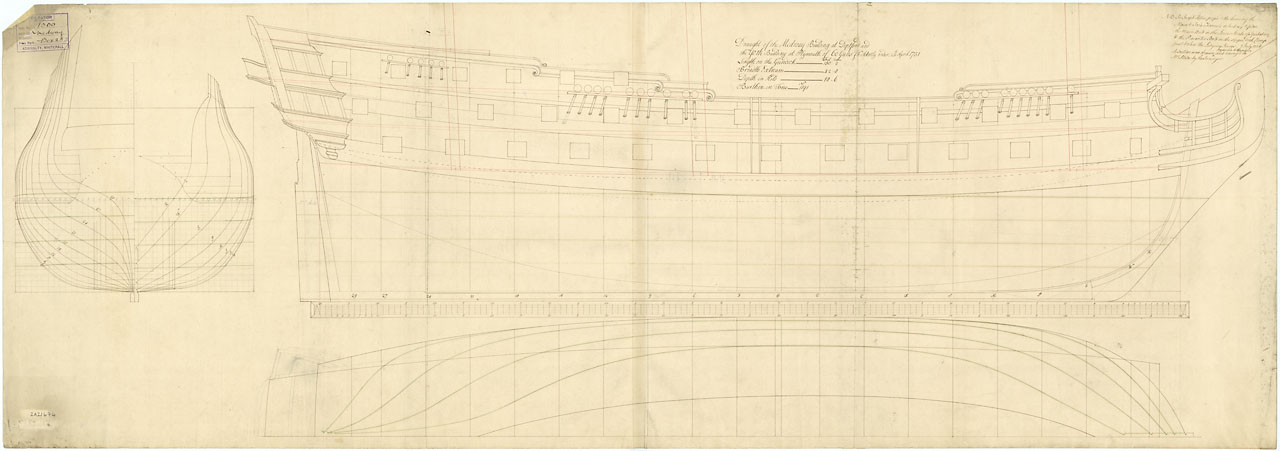
- York

History

Great Britain
- Name: HMS York
- Ordered: 28 March 1751
- Builder: Plymouth Dockyard: Thomas Slade (1751-1752); John Lock (1752-1753)
- Laid down: 19 June 1751
- Launched: 10 November 1753
- Commissioned: February 1755
- In service: 1755-1765
- Fate: Broken up at Plymouth, 1772

General characteristics
- Class & type: 1745 Establishment 60-gun fourth rate ship of the line
- Tons burthen: 1,203 10/94 (bm)
- Length: 150 ft 2 in (45.8 m) (gundeck); 123 ft 0 in (37.5 m) (keel)
- Beam: 42 ft 10 in (13.1 m)
- Depth of hold: 18 ft 6 in (5.6 m)
- Sail plan: Full-rigged ship
- Complement: 420
- Armament: 60 guns: Gundeck: 24 × 24 pdrs; Upper deck: 26 × 18 pdrs; Quarterdeck: 8 × 6 pdrs; Forecastle: 2 × 6 pdrs

HMS York was a 60-gun fourth rate ship of the line of the Royal Navy, built at Plymouth Dockyard to the draught specified in the 1745 Establishment, and launched on 10 November 1753. She saw active service during the Seven Years' War against France, and was responsible for the capture of seven French vessels over her ten years at sea. After extensive service in Europe, North America and the east Indies, York was decommissioned in 1765 and broken up at Plymouth in 1772.

== Naval career ==
York was commissioned in February 1755 under Captain Hugh Pigot, in the months before the outbreak of the Seven Years' War. She was immediately assigned to the British fleet at sea under Admiral Edward Hawke. On 10 April 1757 she captured two French vessels, Le Henri and Le Rubis, which were revealed to be sailing under letters of marque to hunt British merchant ships. Further victories followed, with the defeat of French privateers Le Mars, La Cybelle, Les Deux Amis and Le Dromadaire, all in June 1757.

In January 1758 Captain Pigot received orders to sail for North America to add York to the fleet assembling to support British advances against French Canadian strongholds. York was thereafter present at the Siege of Louisburg. This was Pigot's final engagement as York's captain; in early 1759 he was promoted to command of the 84-gun Royal William in the fleet of Sir Charles Saunders. Pigot was replaced by Captain Vincent Pearce, who took York to the East Indies to support British efforts against the French. Captain Pearce died in December and was replaced by Captain Richard Hughes. In February 1761 command transferred from Hughes to Captain Henry Cowell.

War with France concluded with the signing of the Treaty of Paris in February 1763. York remained in the East Indies, but was ordered to be returned to England after Cowell's death in April 1765. She reached Plymouth in July 1765, where she was paid off and her crew discharged to other vessels. She remained tied up at Plymouth for the next five years. A marine survey was conducted in April 1771, but no repairs were made. York was finally broken up at Plymouth in June 1772.
