= George Rodney, 1st Baron Rodney =

Royal Navy officer, politician and colonial administrator (1718–1792)

Admiral The Right Honourable The Lord Rodney KB
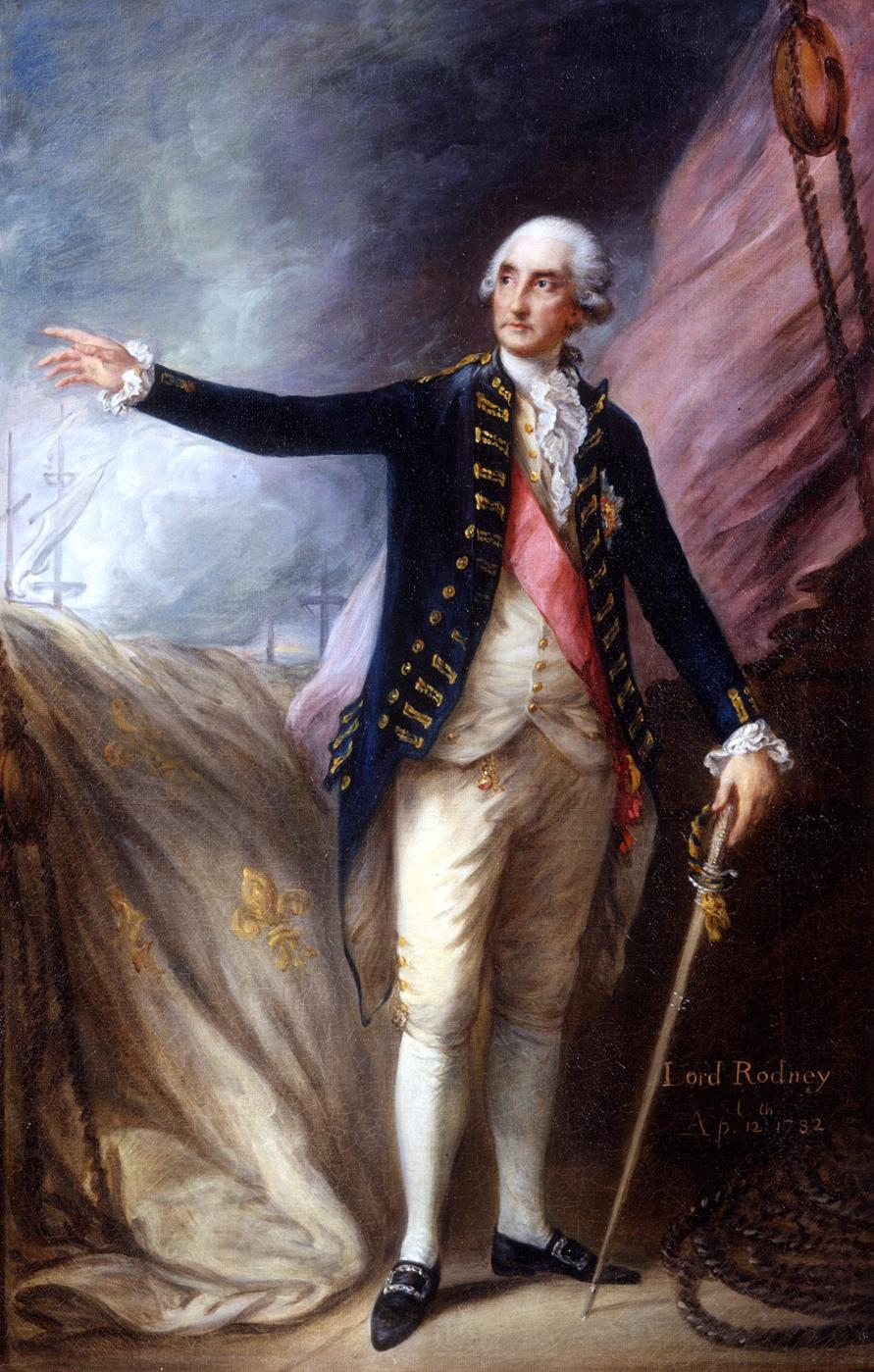
- Admiral Rodney at the Battle of the Saintes by Thomas Gainsborough, 1783
- Born: 1718; Walton-on-Thames, Surrey
- Died: 24 May 1792 (aged 74); Hanover Square, London
- Burial place: Old Alresford, Hampshire
- Children: 7, including George and John
- Military career
- Allegiance: Great Britain
- Branch: Royal Navy
- Service years: 1732–1792
- Rank: Admiral of the White
- Commands: Jamaica Station; Leeward Islands Station
- Conflicts: War of the Austrian Succession; Second Battle of Cape Finisterre; Seven Years' War; Raid on Rochefort; Le Havre raid; Siege of Louisbourg (1758); Invasion of Martinique (1762); Invasion of Grenada (1762); Invasion of Saint Lucia (1762); Siege of Havana; American War of Independence; Action of 8 January 1780; Battle of Cape St. Vincent (1780); Great Siege of Gibraltar; Battle of Martinique (1780); Invasion of Tobago; Battle of the Saintes; Fourth Anglo–Dutch War; Capture of Sint Eustatius
- Awards: Knight of the Order of the Bath

Viceregal styles of The Lord Rodney
- Reference style: His Excellency
- Spoken style: Your Excellency

Admiral of the White George Brydges Rodney, 1st Baron Rodney, KB (1718 – 24 May 1792) was a Royal Navy officer, politician and colonial administrator. He is best known for his service in the American War of Independence, particularly his victory over the French at the Battle of the Saintes in 1782. It has often been claimed that Rodney pioneered the tactic of breaking the line, though this is disputed.

Rodney went to sea at the age of 14, with his first major action being the Second Battle of Cape Finisterre in 1747. He made a large amount of prize money during the 1740s, allowing him to purchase a large country estate and a seat in the British House of Commons. During the Seven Years' War, Rodney was involved in a number of amphibious operations such as the Rochefort and Le Havre raids and capture of Louisbourg. He became well known for his role in the capture of Martinique in 1762. Following the 1763 Treaty of Paris, Rodney's financial situation stagnated. He spent large sums of money pursuing his political ambitions, and by 1774 had run up large debts and was forced to flee Britain to avoid his creditors. He was in a French jail when war broke out between Britain and France in 1778. Thanks to a French benefactor, Rodney was able to secure his release and return to Britain where he was appointed to a new command.

Rodney successfully relieved Gibraltar during the Franco-Spanish siege and defeated a Spanish fleet at the 1780 Battle of Cape St. Vincent. He then was posted to the Jamaica Station, where he led the capture of Sint Eustatius of 1781. Later that year, Rodney briefly returned home as he was suffering from ill health. Orders for his recall had been sent when Rodney won a decisive victory at the Battle of the Saintes in April 1782, ending Franco-Spanish plans to invade Jamaica. On his return to Britain, Rodney was made a peer and was awarded an annual pension of £2,000. He lived in retirement until his death in 1792.

== Early life ==
George Brydges Rodney was born either in Walton-on-Thames or in London, though the family seat was Rodney Stoke, Somerset. He was most likely born sometime in January 1718. He was baptised in St Giles-in-the-Fields on 13 February 1718. He was the third of four surviving children of Henry Rodney and Mary (Newton) Rodney, daughter of Sir Henry Newton. His father had served in Spain under the Earl of Peterborough during the War of the Spanish Succession, and on leaving the army served as captain in a marine corps which was disbanded in 1713. A major investment in the South Sea Company ruined Henry Rodney and impoverished the family. In spite of their lack of money, the family was well-connected by marriage. It is sometimes claimed that Henry Rodney had served as commander of the Royal Yacht of George I and it was after him that George was named, but this had been discounted more recently.

George was educated at Harrow School, and left as one of the last King's letter boys to join the Royal Navy, having been appointed, by warrant dated 21 June 1732, a junior officer on board Sunderland.

== Early career ==
After serving aboard Sunderland, Rodney switched to Dreadnought where he served from 1734 to 1737 under Captain Henry Medley who acted as a mentor to him. Around this time he spent eighteen months stationed in Lisbon, a city he would later return to several times. He then changed ships several times, taking part in the navy's annual trip to protect the British fishing fleet off Newfoundland in 1738.

He rose swiftly through the ranks of the navy helped by a combination of his own talents and the patronage of the Duke of Chandos. While serving on the Mediterranean Station he was promoted to lieutenant and made captain of Dolphin on 15 February 1739. He then served on Namur, the flagship of the Commander-in-Chief Sir Thomas Mathews.

=== Captain ===
The War of the Austrian Succession had broken out by this point, and in August 1742, Rodney had his first taste of action when he was ordered by Matthews to take a smaller vessel and launch a raid on Ventimiglia, where the Spanish army had stockpiled supplies and stores ready for a planned invasion of Britain's ally the Republic of Genoa, which he successfully accomplished. Shortly after this, he was promoted to post-captain on 9 November 1742, having been appointed by Matthews to Plymouth on 9 November. He picked up several British merchantmen in Lisbon to escort them home, but lost contact with them in heavy storms. Once he reached Britain his promotion was confirmed, making him one of the youngest post-captains in the British navy.

After serving in home waters learning about convoy protection he was appointed to the newly built Ludlow Castle which he used to blockade the Scottish coast during the Jacobite Rebellion in 1745. Two of Rodney's midshipman aboard Ludlow Castle were Samuel Hood, later to become a distinguished sailor, and Rodney's younger brother James Rodney. In 1746 he obtained command of the 60-gun Eagle. After some time spent blockading French-occupied Ostend and cruising around the Western Approaches, where on 24 May he took his first prize a 16-gun Spanish privateer, Eagle was sent to join the Western Squadron.

=== Battle of Cape Finisterre ===
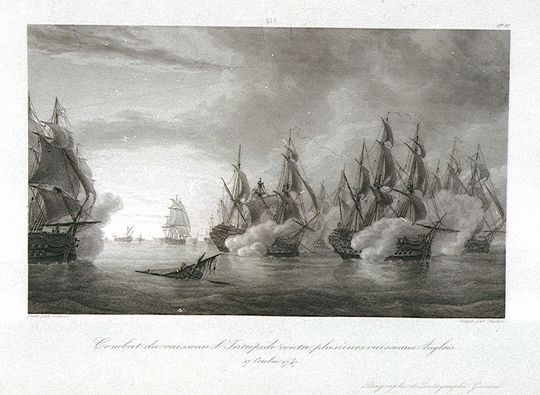
The Second Battle of Cape Finisterre in October 1747.

The Western Squadron was a new strategy by Britain's naval planners to operate a more effective blockade system of France by stationing the Home Fleet in the Western Approaches, where they could guard both the English Channel and the French Atlantic coast.

Eagle continued to take prizes while stationed with the Squadron being involved directly, or indirectly, in the capture of sixteen French ships. After taking one of the captured prizes to Kinsale in Ireland, Eagle was not present at the First Battle of Cape Finisterre when the Western Squadron commanded by Lord Anson won a significant victory over the French. While returning from Ireland, Eagle fell in with a small squadron under Commodore Thomas Fox which sighted a French merchant convoy heading for the Bay of Biscay. In total around 48 merchantmen were taken by the squadron, although Rodney ignored an order of Fox by pursuing several ships which had broken away from the rest in an attempt to escape managing to capture six of them. Afterwards Eagle rejoined the Western Squadron now under the command of Edward Hawke.

On 14 October 1747 the ship took part in the Second Battle of Cape Finisterre, a victory off Ushant over the French fleet. The French were trying to escort an outgoing convoy from France to the West Indies and had eight large ships-of-the-line while the British had fourteen smaller ships. Rodney was at the rear of the British line, and Eagle was one of the last British ships to come into action engaging the French shortly after noon. Initially Eagle was engaged with two French ships, but one moved away. Rodney engaged the 70-gun Neptune for two hours until his steering wheel was struck by a lucky shot, and his ship became unmanageable. Rodney later complained that Thomas Fox in Kent had failed to support him, and testified at Fox's court martial. The British took six of the eight French ships, but were unable to prevent most of the merchant convoy escaping, although much of it was later taken in the West Indies.

The two Battles of Cape Finisterre had proved a vindication of the Western Squadron strategy. Rodney later often referred to "the good old discipline" of the Western Squadron, using it as an example for his own views on discipline. For the remainder of the war Rodney took part in further cruises, and took several more prizes. Following the Congress of Breda, an agreement was signed at the Treaty of Aix-la-Chapelle ending the war. Rodney took his ship back to Plymouth where it was decommissioned on 13 August 1748. Rodney's total share of prize money during his time with Eagle was £15,000 giving him financial security for the first time in his life.

== Commander ==
On 9 May 1749 he was appointed governor and commander-in-chief of Newfoundland, with the rank of Commodore, it being usual at that time to appoint a naval officer, chiefly on account of the fishery interests. He was given command of HMS Rainbow and had two smaller ships under his overall command. It was extremely difficult for naval officers to secure commands in peacetime, and Rodney's appointment suggests that he was well regarded by his superiors. Rodney's role as Governor was rather limited. Each summer a large British fishing fleet sailed for Newfoundland, where it took part in the valuable cod trade. The fleet then returned home during the winter. Rodney oversaw three such trips to Newfoundland between 1749 and 1751.

Around this time Rodney began to harbour political ambitions and gained the support of the powerful Duke of Bedford and Lord Sandwich. He stood unsuccessfully in a 1750 by-election in Launceston. He was elected MP for Saltash, a safe seat controlled by the British Admiralty, in 1751. After his third and final trip to Newfoundland in the summer of 1751, Rodney sailed home via Spain and Portugal, escorting some merchantmen. Once home he fell ill, and was then unemployed for around ten months. During this time he oversaw the development of an estate at Old Alresford in Hampshire, which he had bought with the proceeds of his prize money.

From 1753 Rodney commanded a series of Portsmouth guard ships without actually having to go to sea before the onset of the Seven Years' War.

== Seven Years' War ==
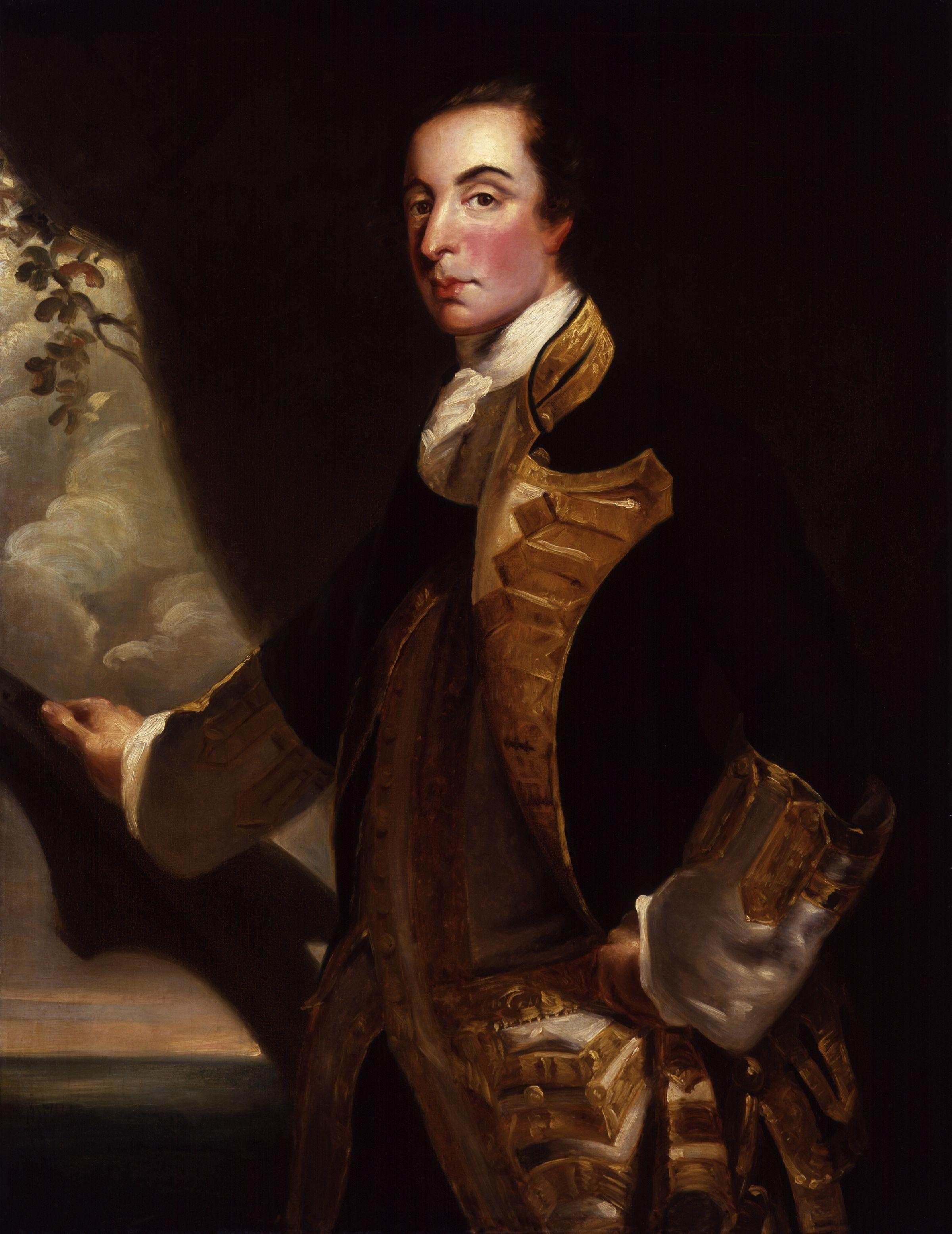
1759 portrait of Rodney by Sir Joshua Reynolds

The first fighting broke out in North America in 1754, with competing British and French forces clashing in the Ohio Country. Despite this fighting formal war wasn't declared in Europe until 1756 and opened with the French laying siege to Minorca, the loss of which was blamed on Admiral of the Blue John Byng, who was court-martialled and executed. He was shot on the quarterdeck of Monarch, which until recently had been commanded by Rodney. Rodney excused himself from serving on the court martial by pleading illness. While Rodney disapproved of Byng's conduct, he thought the death sentence excessive and unsuccessfully worked for it to be commuted.

=== Louisbourg ===
Rodney had in 1755 and 1756, taken part in preventive cruises under Hawke and Edward Boscawen. In 1757, he took part in the expedition against Rochefort, commanding the 74-gun ship of the line Dublin. After an initial success, the expedition made no serious attempt on Rochefort and sailed for home. Next year, in the same ship, he was ordered to serve under Boscawen as part of an attempt to capture the strategic French fortress of Louisbourg in North America. He was given the task of carrying Major General Jeffery Amherst, the expedition's commander to Louisbourg. On the way Rodney captured a French East Indiamen, and took it into Vigo. This action saw the beginning of criticism of Rodney that he was obsessed with prize money ahead of strategic importance, with some claiming he spent two weeks or more in Vigo making sure of his prize money instead of carrying Amherst to Louisbourg. This appears to be untrue, as Rodney sailed within four days from Vigo.

Rodney and his ship played a minor role in the taking of Louisburg, which laid the way open for a British campaign up the St Lawrence River the following year, and the fall of Quebec. In August 1758 Rodney sailed for home in charge of six warships and ten transports carrying the captured garrison of Louisbourg who were being taken to Britain as prisoners of war.

=== Le Havre ===
On 19 May 1759, Rodney was promoted to Rear-Admiral of the Blue and shortly afterwards given command of a small squadron. The Admiralty had received intelligence that the French had gathered at Le Havre, at the mouth of the River Seine, a large number of flat-bottomed boats and stores which were being collected there for an invasion of the British Isles. After drawing up plans for an attack on Le Havre, Lord Anson briefed Rodney in person. The operation was intended to be a secret with it being implied that Rodney's actual destination was Gibraltar. This soon became impossible to maintain as Rodney tried to acquire pilots who knew the Normandy coast.

Rodney received his final orders on 26 June, and by 4 July he was off Le Havre. His force included six bomb-vessels which could fire at a very high trajectory. In what become known as the Le Havre raid, he bombarded the town for two days and nights, and inflicted great loss of war-material on the French. The bomb ships fired continuously for fifty two hours, starting large fires. Rodney then withdrew to Spithead, leaving several ships to blockade the mouth of the Seine. Although the attack hadn't significantly affected French plans, it proved a morale boost in Britain. In August Rodney was again sent to Le Havre with similar orders but through a combination of weather and improved French defences he was unable to get his bomb-vessels into position, and the Admiralty accepted his judgement that a further attack was impossible. The invasion was ultimately cancelled because of French naval defeats at the Battle of Lagos and Battle of Quiberon Bay.

From 1759 and 1761 Rodney concentrated on his blockade of the French coast, particularly around Le Havre. In July 1760, with another small squadron, he succeeded in capturing several French flat-bottomed boats and in blockading France's coast as far as Dieppe.

=== Martinique ===
Rodney was elected MP for Penryn in 1761. Lord Anson then selected him to command the naval element of a planned amphibious attack on the lucrative and strategically important French colony of Martinique in the West Indies, promoting him over the heads of a number of more senior officers. A previous British attack on Martinique had failed in 1759. The land forces for the attack on Martinique were to be a combination of troops from various locations including some sent out from Europe and reinforcements from New York City, who were available following the Conquest of Canada which had been completed in 1760. During 1761 Martinique was blockaded by Sir James Douglas to prevent reinforcements or supplies from reaching it. In 1762 he was formally appointed commander-in-chief of the Leeward Islands Station.

In early 1762, Rodney and Robert Monckton led an expeditionary force which captured Martinique, while both Saint Lucia and Grenada had surrendered to his squadron. During the siege of Fort Royal his seamen and marines rendered excellent service on shore. Afterwards Rodney's squadron, amounting to eight ships of the line joined the British expedition to Cuba bringing the total number of ships of the line to 15 by the end of April 1762. However he was later criticised for moving his ships to protect Jamaica from attack by a large Franco-Spanish force that had gathered in the area, rather than waiting to support the expedition as he had been ordered.

Following the Treaty of Paris in 1763, Rodney returned home having been during his absence made Vice-Admiral of the Blue on 21 October 1762 and having received the thanks of both Houses of Parliament. In the peace terms Martinique was returned to France.

== Years of peace ==
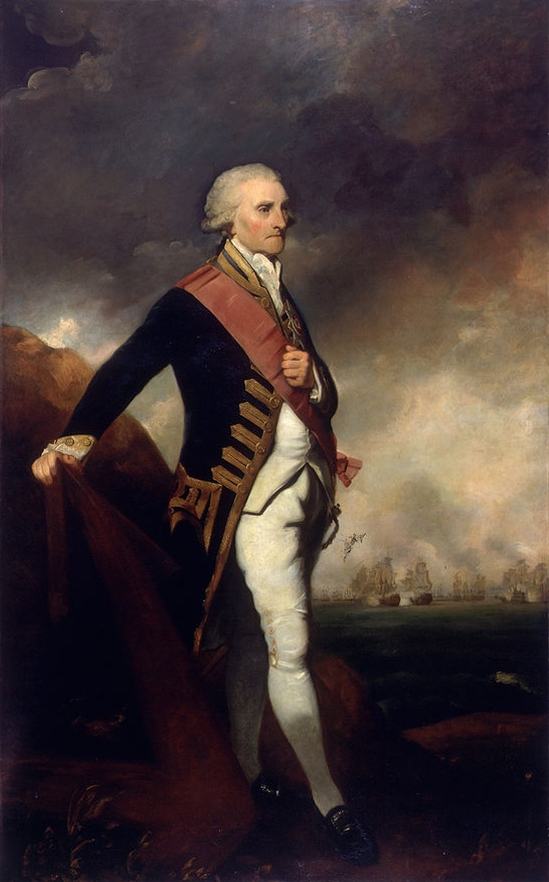
1789 portrait of Rodney by Sir Joshua Reynolds

From 1765 to 1770, Rodney was governor of Greenwich Hospital, and on the dissolution of parliament in 1768 he successfully contested Northampton and was elected to parliament, but at a ruinous cost. Rodney was promoted to Vice-Admiral of the White on 18 October 1770 and Vice-Admiral of the Red six days later. When appointed Commander-in-Chief of the Jamaica Station in 1771, he lost his Greenwich post, but a few months later received the office of Rear-Admiral of Great Britain. Until 1774, he held the Jamaica command, and during a period of quiet, was active in improving the naval yards on his station. Sir George struck his flag with a feeling of disappointment at not obtaining the governorship of Jamaica, and was shortly after forced to settle in Paris. Election expenses and losses at play in fashionable circles had shattered his fortune, and he could not secure payment of the salary as Rear-Admiral of Great Britain. In February 1778, having just been promoted to Admiral of the White, he used every possible exertion to obtain a command to free himself from his money difficulties. By May, he had, through the splendid generosity of his Parisian friend Marshal Biron, effected the latter task, and accordingly he returned to London with his children. The debt was repaid out of the arrears due to him on his return. The story that he was offered a French command is fiction.

== American War of Independence ==
In London, he suggested to Lord George Germain that George Washington could "certainly be bought – honours will do it".

=== Moonlight Battle ===
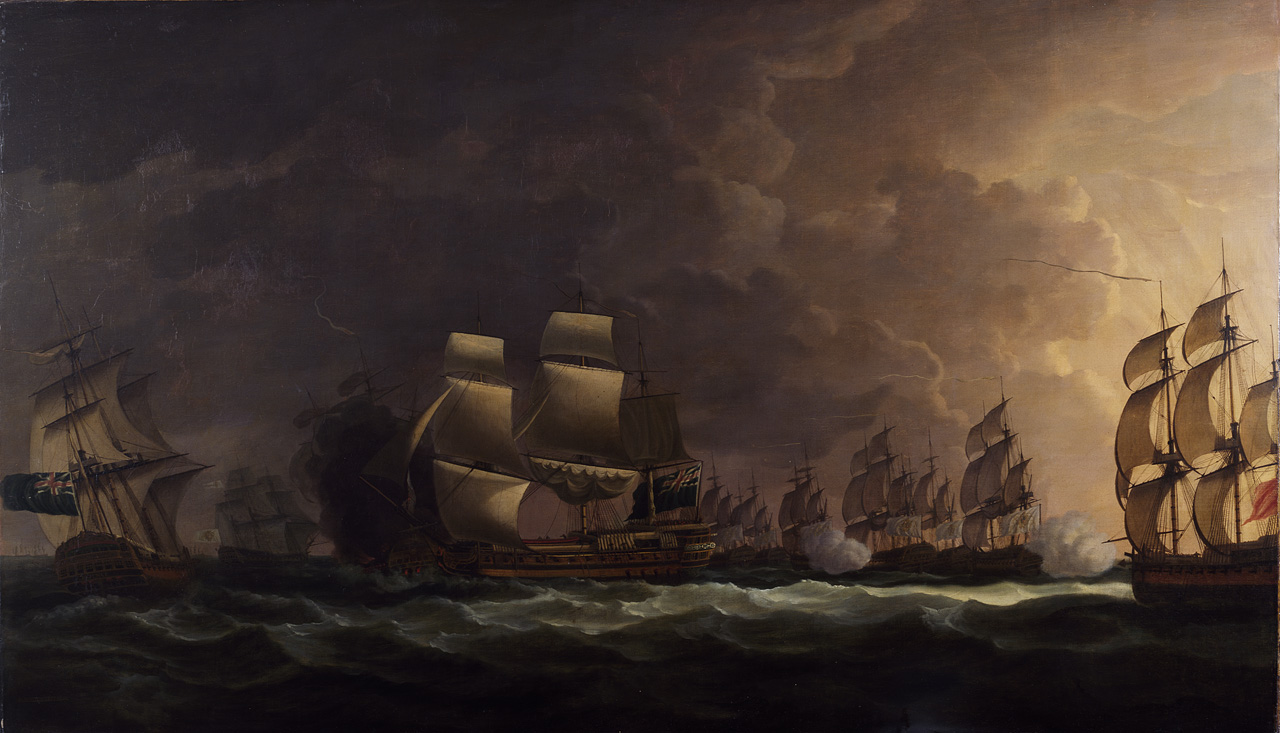
The Moonlight Battle by Dominic Serres, 1781

Rodney was appointed once more commander-in-chief of the Leeward Islands Station late in 1779. His orders were to relieve Gibraltar on his way to the West Indies. He captured a Spanish convoy of 22 vessels off Cape Finisterre on 8 January 1780. Eight days later at the Battle of Cape St. Vincent he defeated a Spanish fleet under Juan de Lángara, capturing or destroying seven ships of the line. He then brought some relief to Gibraltar by delivering reinforcements and supplies.

=== Battle of Martinique ===
On 17 April he fought the Battle of Martinique with a French fleet under Luc Urbain du Bouëxic, comte de Guichen which, owing to the carelessness of some of Rodney's captains, was indecisive. Rodney fought two further actions with Guichen's fleet on 15 and 19 May, which were also indecisive.

=== Capture of St Eustatius ===
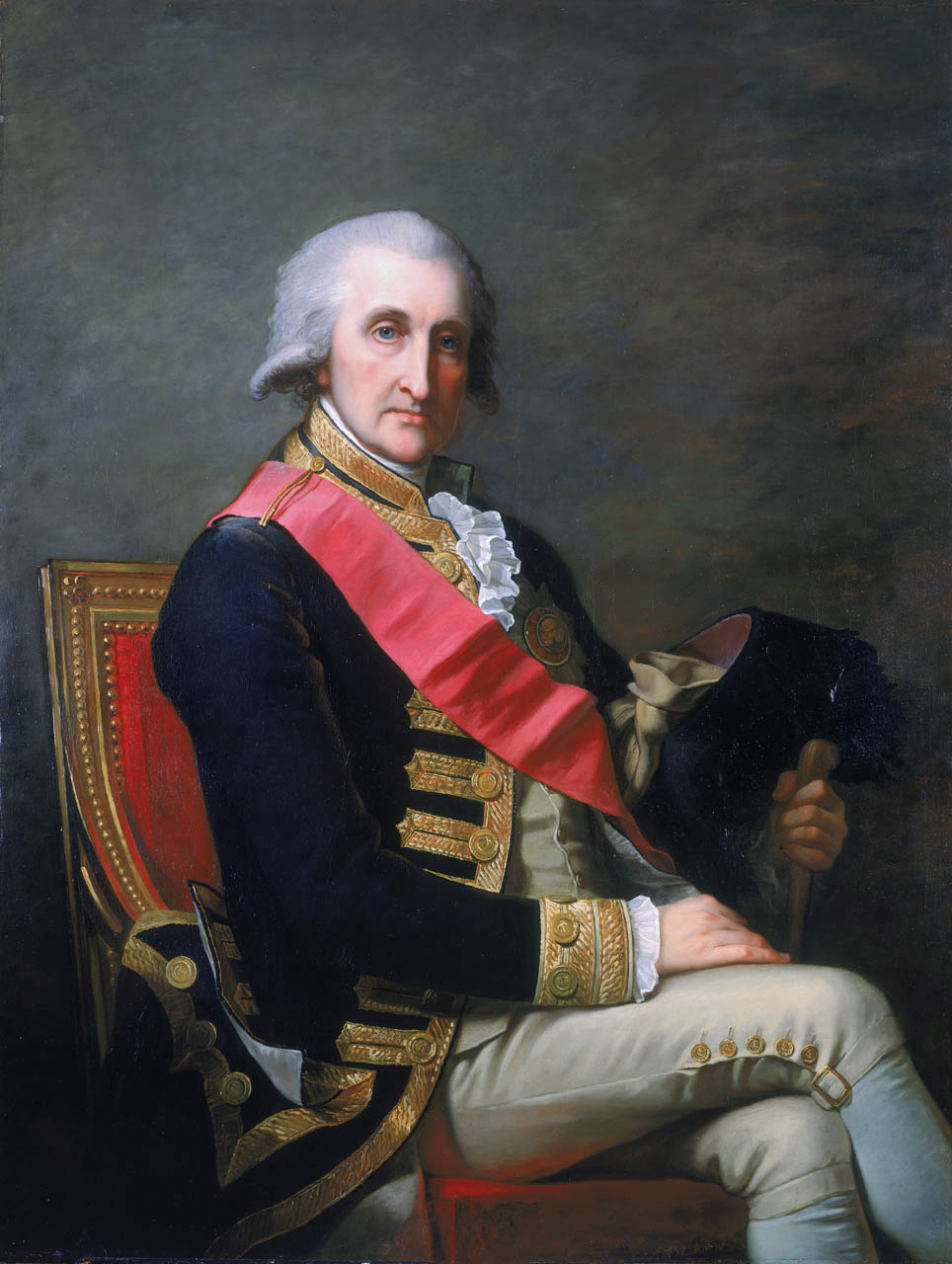
Admiral George Brydges Rodney, 1st Baron Rodney, by Jean-Laurent Mosnier, painted 1791.

Following the outbreak of the Fourth Anglo-Dutch War between Britain and the Dutch Republic Rodney, acting under orders from London, captured the valuable Dutch island of St Eustatius on 3 February 1781. Rodney had already identified several individuals on the island who were aiding the Americans, such as "... Mr Smith at the House of Jones – they (the Jews of St. Eustatius, Caribbean Antilles) cannot be too soon taken care of – they are notorious in the cause of America and France..." The island was also home to a Jewish community who were mainly merchants with significant international trading and maritime commercial ties. The Jews were estimated to have been at least 10% of the permanent population of St. Eustatius.

Rodney immediately arrested and imprisoned 101 Jews in the warehouses of the lower city. He summarily deported 31 adult Jews to the island of Saint Kitts. Rodney looted Jewish personal possessions and even tore out the linings of the clothes of his captives in search of hidden valuables; this alone yielded him 8,000 pounds. When Rodney realised that the Jews might be hiding additional treasure, he dug up their local cemetery. Even large quantities of non-military trading goods belonging to British merchants on the island were arbitrarily confiscated. This resulted in Rodney being entangled in a series of costly lawsuits for the rest of his life. Still, the wealth Rodney acquired on St. Eustatius exceeded his expectations.

=== Controversy and Yorktown ===
Rodney wrote to his family with promises of a new London home; to his daughter "the best harpsichord money can purchase". He confidently wrote of a marriage settlement for one of his sons and a soon-to-be purchased commission in the Foot Guards for another son. Rodney also wrote of a dowry for his daughter to marry the Earl of Oxford and noted he would have enough to pay off the young prospective bridegroom's debts.

Other Royal Navy officers scathingly criticised Rodney for his actions. In particular, Samuel Hood suggested that Rodney should have sailed to intercept a French fleet under Francois Joseph Paul de Grasse, travelling to Martinique. The French fleet instead turned north and headed for the Chesapeake Bay of Virginia and Maryland.

Rodney's delay at St. Eustatius was not the first time he had taken the opportunity to capture prizes over the immediate and expeditious fulfillment of his military duties. During the Seven Years' War Rodney had been ordered to Barbados to link up with Sir George Pocock and Lord Albemarle for the attack on Cuba. Instead, Rodney sent valuable ships off in search of prizes. In 1762, Rodney, after the fall of Martinique, quarreled with the army over prize money. During Rodney's command in Jamaica, 1771–1774, the Earl of Sandwich feared that Rodney might provoke a war with Spain to obtain prize money.

Plundering the wealth of St. Eustatius and capturing many prizes over a number of months, Rodney further weakened his fleet by sending two ships-of-the-line to escort his treasure ships to England, though both were in need of major repair. Nevertheless, he is both blamed and defended for the subsequent disaster at Yorktown. His orders as naval commander in chief in the eastern Caribbean were not only to watch de Grasse but also to protect the valuable sugar trade. Rodney had received intelligence earlier that de Grasse would send part of his fleet before the start of the hurricane season to relieve the French squadron at Newport and to co-operate with Washington, returning in the fall to the Caribbean. The other half of de Grasse's fleet, as usual, would escort the French merchantmen back across the Atlantic. Rodney accordingly made his dispositions in the light of this intelligence. Sixteen of his remaining twenty-one warships would go with Hood to reinforce the squadron at New York under Sir Thomas Graves, while Rodney, who was in ill health, returned to England with three other warships as merchant escorts, leaving two others in dock for repair. Hood was well satisfied with these arrangements, informing a colleague that his fleet was "fully equal to defeat any designs of the enemy." What Rodney and Hood could not know was that at the last moment de Grasse decided to take his entire fleet to North America, leaving the French merchantmen to the protection of the Spanish. The result was a decisive French superiority in warships during the subsequent naval campaign, when the combined fleets of Hood and Graves were unable to relieve the British army of Charles Cornwallis, who was then establishing a base on the York River. This left Cornwallis no option but to surrender, resulting a year later in British recognition of American Independence. Although Rodney's actions at St. Eustatius and afterwards contributed to the British naval inferiority in the Battle of the Chesapeake, the real reason for the disaster at Yorktown was the inability of Britain to match the resources of the other naval powers of Europe.

=== Victory in the Battle of the Saintes ===
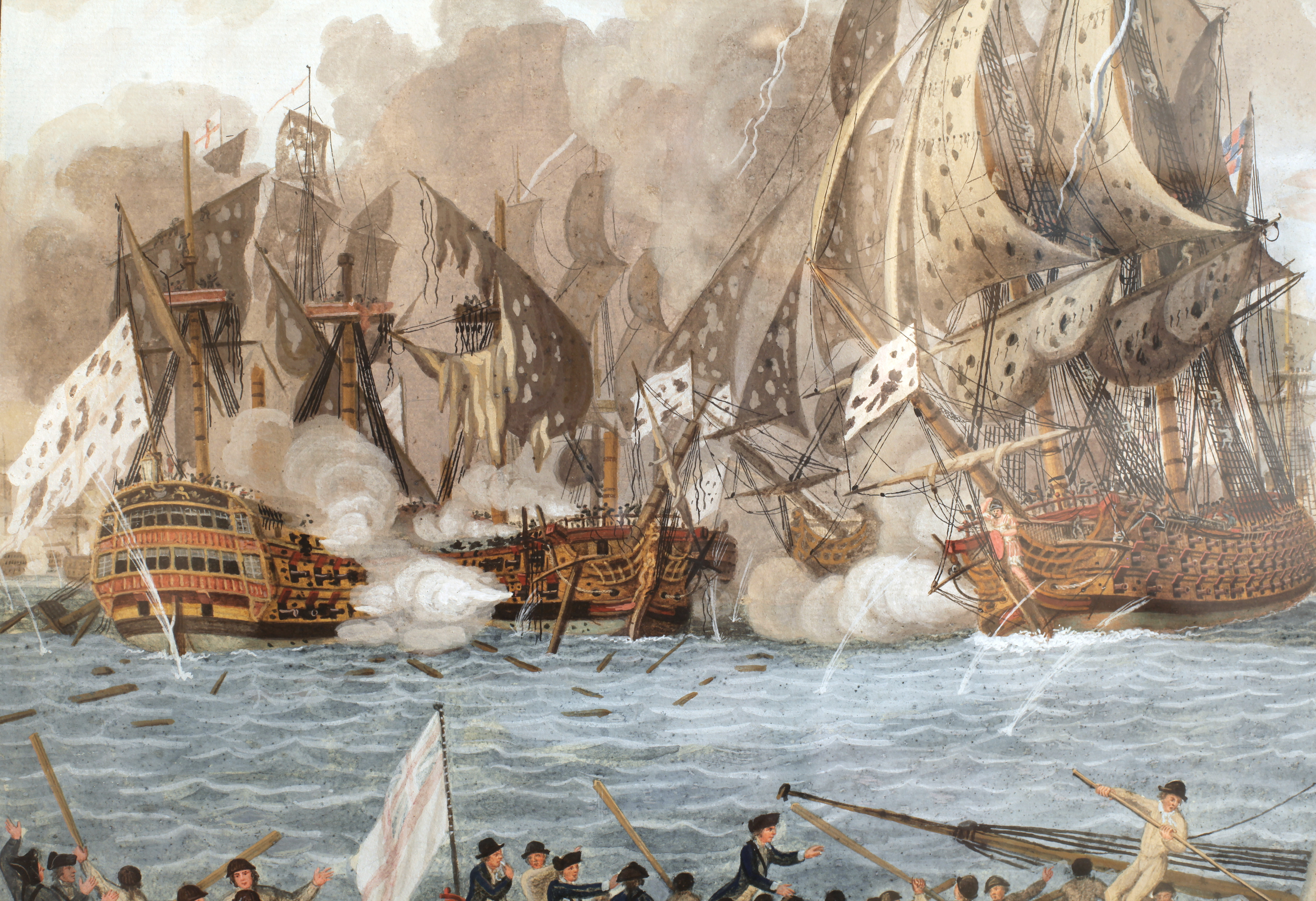
Battle of the Saintes, April 1782 Painting by François Aimé Louis Dumoulin

After a few months in England, restoring his health and defending himself in Parliament, Sir George returned to his command in February 1782, and a running engagement with the French fleet on 9 April led up to his crowning victory at the Battle of the Saintes off Dominica, when on 12 April with thirty-five sail of the line he defeated the Comte de Grasse, who had thirty-three sail. The French inferiority in numbers was more than counterbalanced by the greater size and superior sailing qualities of their ships, yet four French ships of the line were captured (including the flagship) as well as one destroyed after eleven hours' fighting.

This important battle saved Jamaica and ruined French naval prestige, while it enabled Rodney to write: "Within two little years I have taken two Spanish, one French and one Dutch admirals." A long and wearisome controversy exists as to the originator of the manoeuvre of "breaking the line" in this battle, but the merits of the victory have never seriously been affected by any difference of opinion on the question. A shift of wind broke the French line of battle, and the British ships took advantage of this by crossing in two places; many were taken prisoner including the Comte de Grasse.

From 29 April to 10 July he sat with his fleet at Port Royal, Jamaica while his fleet was repaired after the battle.

=== Recall ===
In a 15 April letter to Lord George Germain, who unknown to Rodney had recently lost his position, he wrote "Permit me most sincerely to congratulate you on the most important victory I believe ever gained against our perfidious enemies, the French". The news of Rodney's victories reached England on 18 May 1782 via HMS Andromache and boosted national morale in Britain and strengthened the pro-war party, who wished to carry on the fight. George III observed to the new Prime Minister Lord Shelburne that he "must see that the great success of Lord Rodney's engagement has so far roused the nation, that the peace which would have been acquiesced in three months ago would now be a matter for complaint".

Rodney was preparing to sail to meet the French off Cape Haitien when HMS Jupiter arrived from England, not only relieving him of duty, but also bringing his replacement: Hugh Pigot. This bizarre exchange was largely the result of changing politics in Britain: Rodney was a Tory placed in charge of the fleet by a Tory government... but the Whigs were now in power. That said, at 64 years of age, he was perhaps due for retirement. However, Pigot and the command to retire was dispatched on 15 May, three days before the news of the victory at the Battle of the Saintes reached the Admiralty. A cutter sent by the Admiralty on 19 May failed to catch the Jupiter so Rodney's fate was sealed.

Rodney quietly quit his quarters on the Formidable and returned to England in more modest quarters on HMS Montagu.

== Later life ==
=== Nepotism and self-interest ===
Rodney was unquestionably a most able officer, but he was also vain, selfish and unscrupulous, both in seeking prize money, and in using his position to push the fortunes of his family, although such nepotism was common (not to say normal) at the time. He made his son a post-captain at fifteen, and his assiduous self-interest alienated his fellow officers and the Board of Admiralty alike. Naval historian Nicholas A. M. Rodger describes Rodney as possessing weaknesses with respect to patronage "which destroyed the basis of trust upon which alone an officer can command." It must be remembered that he was then prematurely old and racked by disease.

=== Retirement ===
Rodney arrived home in August to receive unbounded honour from his country. He had already been created Baron Rodney of Rodney Stoke, Somerset, by patent of 19 June 1782, and the House of Commons had voted him a pension of £2000 a year. From this time he led a quiet country life until his death in London. He was succeeded as 2nd Baron by his son, George (1753–1802). In 1782 Rodney was presented with the Freedom of the City of Cork, Ireland. The National Maritime Museum, Greenwich, London, holds the gold presentation box that the City of Cork gave him on 16 September 1782.

== Personal life ==
In 1753 Rodney married firstly Jane Compton (1730–1757), one of the sisters of Charles Compton, 7th Earl of Northampton. He had initially been undecided whether to marry Jane or her younger sister Kitty, whom he had met in Lisbon during his visits to the city, where their father Charles Compton (MP) was consul. The marriage proved happy, and they had two sons together before she died in January 1757:

- George Rodney, 2nd Baron Rodney (25 December 1753 – 2 January 1802)
- Captain the Hon. James Rodney RN, lost at sea in 1776

In 1764, Rodney was created a baronet, and the same year married secondly Henrietta, daughter of John Clies, a merchant of Lisbon. With her he had further two sons and three daughters:

- Captain John Rodney RN (1765–1847), later Chief Secretary to the Government of Ceylon, who married firstly Lady Catherine Nugent, only daughter of Thomas Nugent, 6th Earl of Westmeath, secondly Lady Louisa Martha Stratford, daughter and coheiress of John Stratford, 3rd Earl of Aldborough, and thirdly Antoinette Reyne, only daughter of Anthony Pierre Reyne, having children by all three wives; his daughter Catherine Henrietta Rodney married Patrick Stuart, later Governor of Malta, and their daughter Jane Frances Stuart married George Grey.
- Jane Rodney (born c. 1766), who in 1784 married George Chambers; they had nine children;
- Sarah Brydges Rodney (1780–1871), who in 1801 married General Godfrey Basil Meynell Mundy and had children
- Captain Edward Rodney RN (1783–1828), who married Rebecca Geer, with children;
- Margaret Anne Rodney (died 1858)

Rodney died in 1792 and was buried in the church of St Mary the Virgin, Old Alresford, Hampshire, which adjoins his family seat. There is also a memorial to him within St Paul's Cathedral.

== Legacy ==
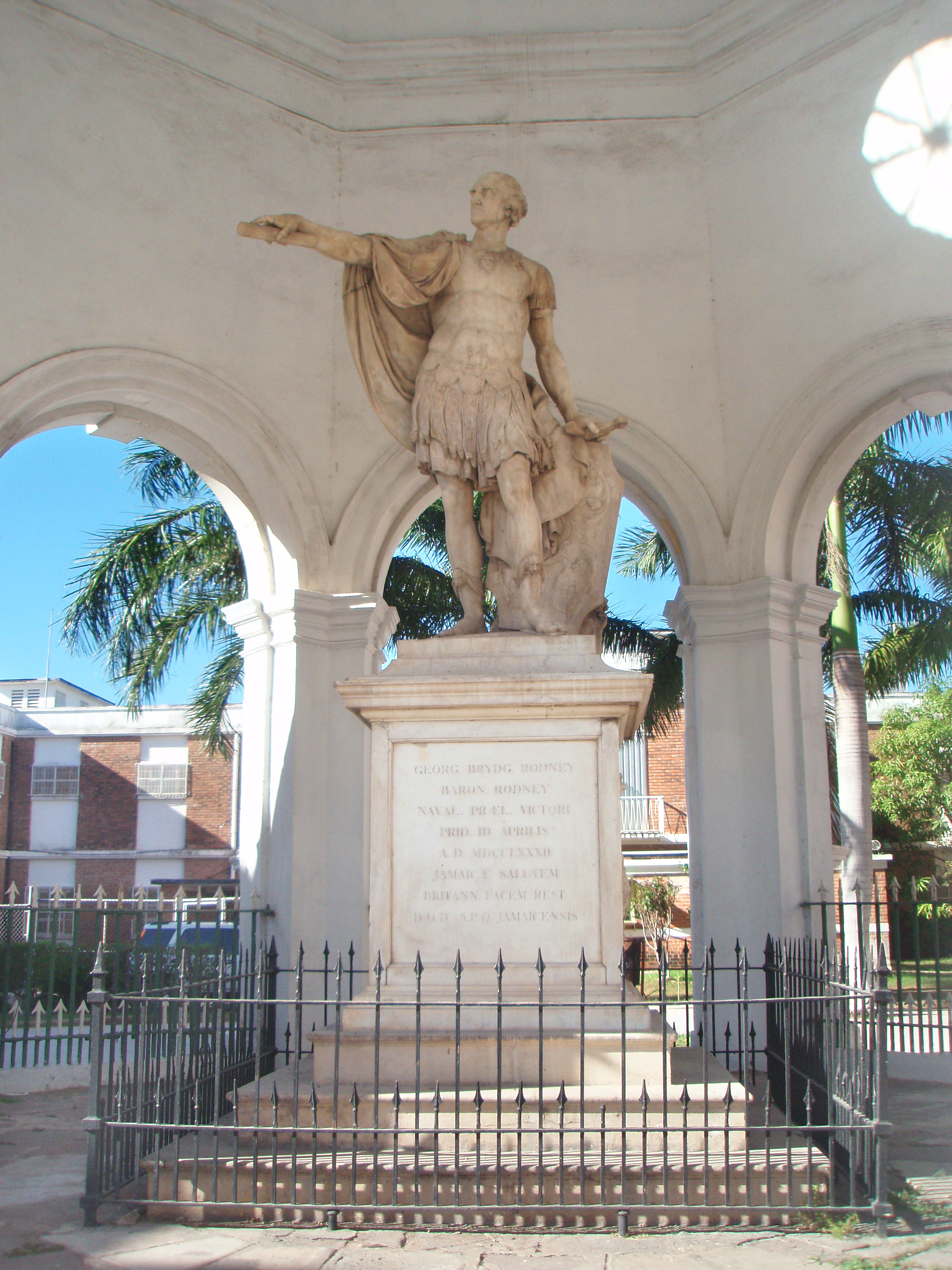
Monument of George Brydges Rodney in Spanish Town

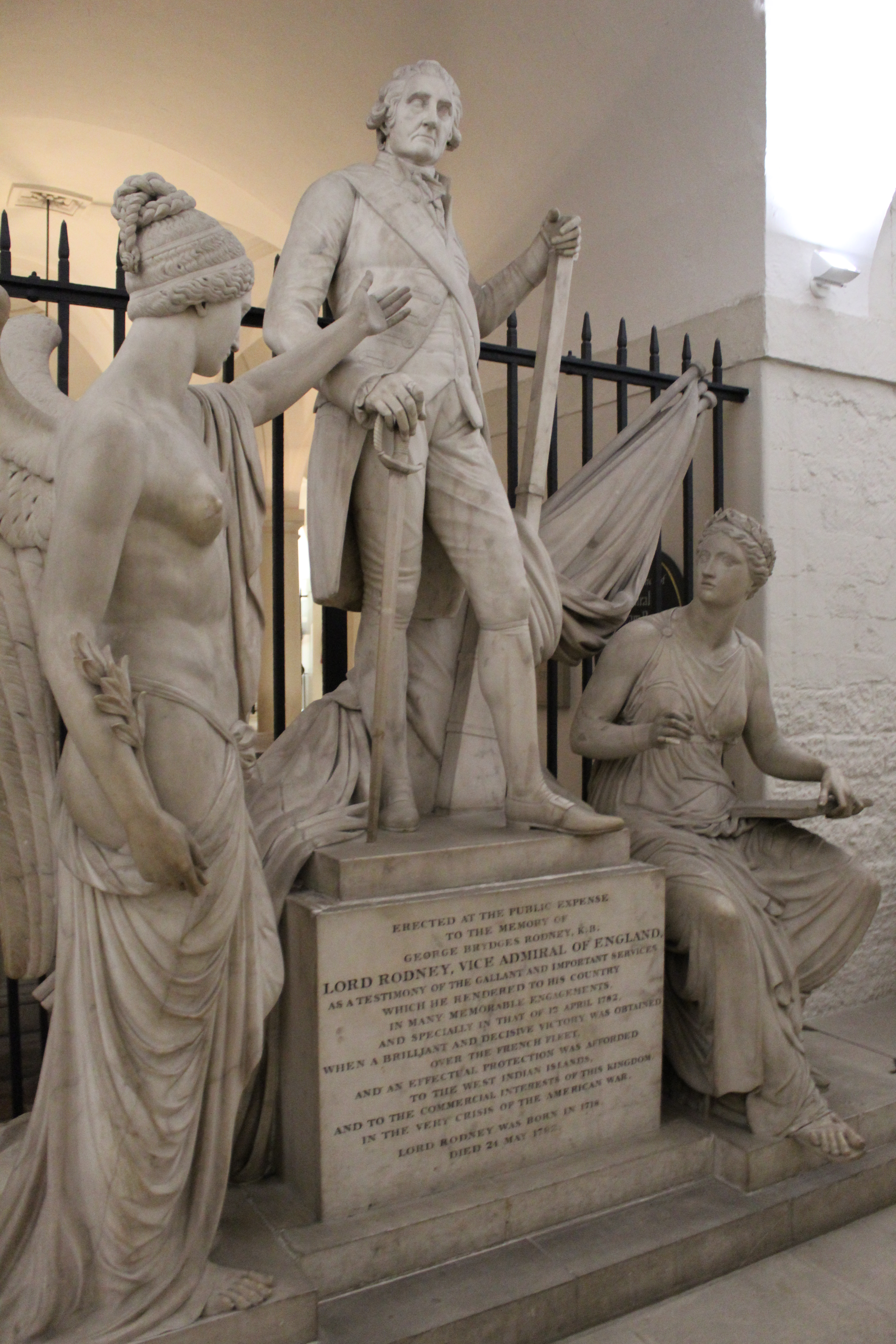
Memorial in St Paul's Cathedral, London

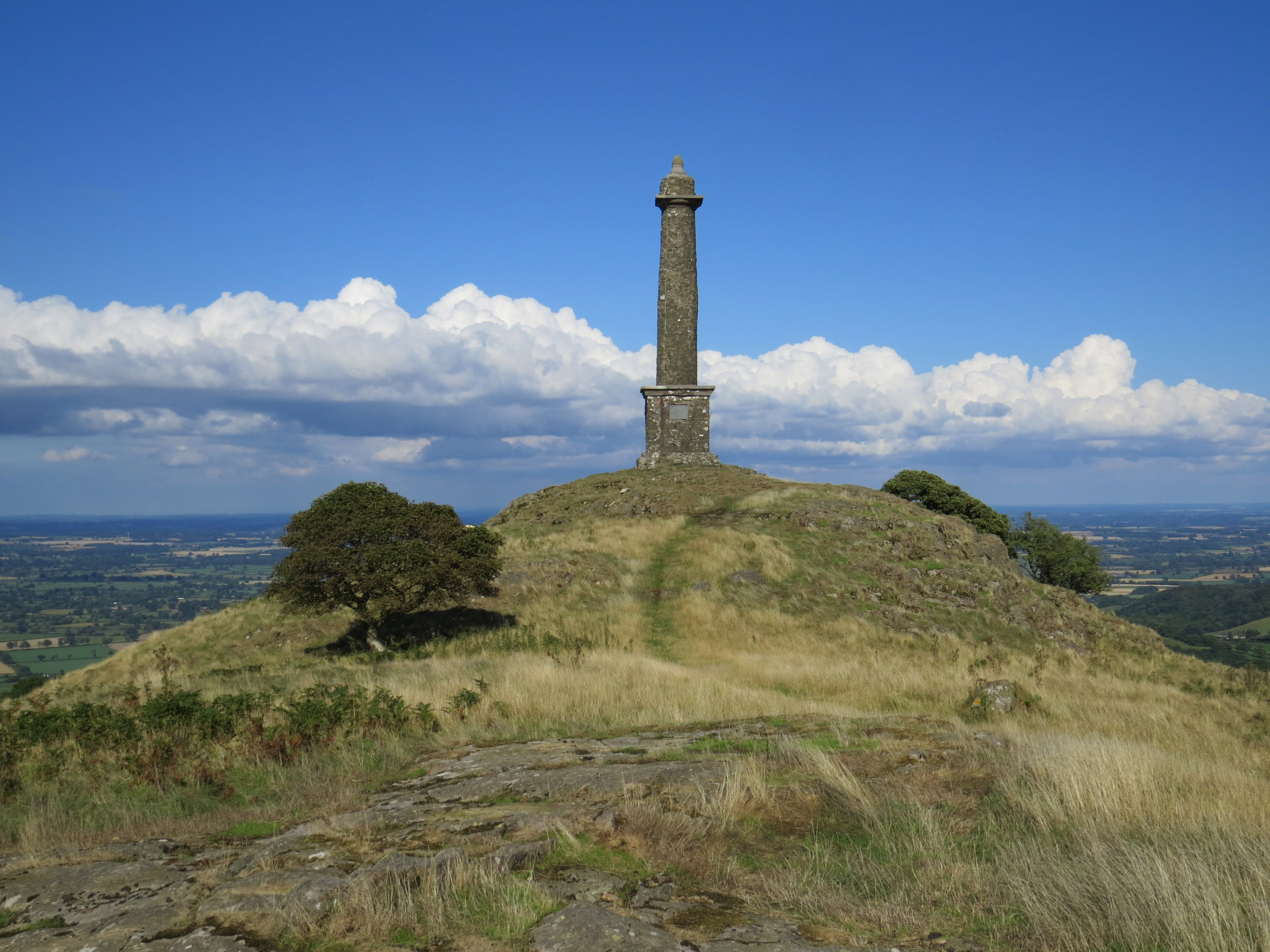
Rodney's Pillar on Breidden Hill in Wales

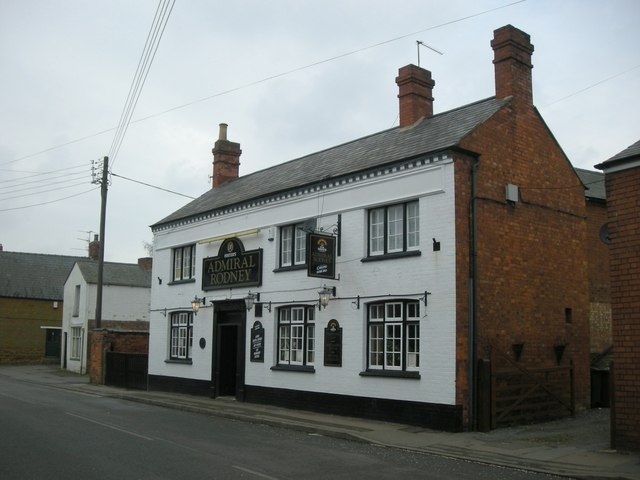
Admiral Rodney public house, Long Buckby

In February 1783, the colonial government of Jamaica commissioned John Bacon, a renowned British sculptor, to create a statue of Rodney, as an expression of their appreciation. The Assembly spent $5,200 on the statue alone and a reputed $31,000 on the entire project. Bacon sourced the finest marble from Italy to create the Neo-classical sculpture of Rodney, dressed in a Roman robe and breastplate. On its completion, the statue was fronted with cannons taken from the French flagship, Ville de Paris, in the battle. The truly huge monument, known as the Rodney Temple stands in Spanish Town, Jamaica, next to the Governor's House.

In late 1782 and early 1783 a large number of existing taverns renamed themselves "The Admiral Rodney" in admiration of the victory. Admiral Rodney's Pillar was constructed on the peak of Breidden Hill to commemorate his victories.

In St. Paul's Cathedral crypt, there is a memorial to Rodney designed by Charles Rossi.

At least four serving warships of the Royal Navy have been named HMS Rodney in his honour.

Two British public schools, Churcher's College and Emanuel School, have houses named after him.

Due to his popularity with citizens of Newfoundland as governor, small round-bottomed wooden boats, propelled by oars and/or sails, are often referred to as a "Rodney" up to the present day in Newfoundland.

In 1793, following Rodney's death, Scotland's Bard, the poet Robert Burns (1759–1796), published a poem "Lines On The Commemoration Of Rodney's Victory" commemorating the Battle of the Saintes. The poem opens with the lines:

"Instead of a Song, boy's, I'll give you a Toast;
"Here's to the memory of those on the twelfth that we lost!-
"That we lost, did I say?-nay, by Heav'n, that we found;
"For their fame it will last while the world goes round. “

=== Places named after Rodney ===
- Rodney Street, Liverpool
- Rodney Street, Edinburgh
- Rodney Bay, Saint Lucia, the Caribbean
- Rodney County, New Zealand
- Rodney Gardens, Perth, Scotland
- Cape Rodney, North Island, New Zealand
- Rodney, Ontario, Canada
- Admiral Rodney – Pub, Worcestershire
- Admiral Rodney - Pub, Criggion Lane, Powys
- Admiral Lord Rodney - Pub, Colne, Lancashire
- Admiral Rodney - Hotel, Horncastle, Lincolnshire
- Admiral Rodney - Pub, Sheffield
- Rodney Inn - Pub, Helston, Cornwall
- The Admiral Rodney Inn - Criggion, Powys (in sight of Rodney's Pillar monument on Breidden Hill)
- The Admiral Rodney Inn - Pub, Hartshorne, Swadlincote, Derbyshire.
- The Admiral Rodney - Pub, Prestbury, Cheshire
- The Lord Rodney - Pub, Keighley, West Yorkshire
- The Admiral Rodney - Pub, Calverton, Nottinghamshire
- The Rodney Hotel - Hotel, Clifton, Bristol
- Admiral Rodney - Pub, Wollaton, Nottinghamshire

== Bibliography ==
- Cundall, Frank (1915). Historic Jamaica. West India Committee.
- The Naval Chronicle, Volume 1 1799, J. Gold, London. (reissued by Cambridge University Press, 2010. ISBN 978-1-108-01840-1
- Fraser, Edward (2009). Famous Fighters of the Fleet: Glimpses Through the Cannon Smoke in the Days of the Old Navy (1904). Kessinger Publishing. ISBN 9781104820039.
- Fleming, Thomas. The Perils of Peace: America's Struggle for Survival After Yorktown. First Smithsonian books, 2008.
- Hannay, David. Life of Rodney. Macmillan, 1891.
- Hibbert, Christopher. Redcoats and Rebels: The American Revolution Through British Eyes. Avon Books, 1990.
- General Mundy, Life and Correspondence of Admiral Lord Rodney (2 vols, 1830)
- O'Shaunhassey, Andrew Jackson. The Men Who Lost America: British Leadership, the American Revolution and the Fate of Empire. Yale University Press, 2013.
- Rodger, N. A. M. Command of the Ocean: A Naval History of Britain, 1649–1815. Penguin Books, 2006.
- Spinney, David. Rodney, George Allen & Unwin, 1969.
- Stewart, William. Admirals of the World: A Biographical Dictionary 1500 to the Present. McFarland, 2009.
- Trew, Peter. Rodney and the Breaking of the Line. Pen and Sword, 2006.
- Weintraub, Stanley. Iron Tears: Rebellion in America, 1775–1783. Simon & Schuster, 2005.
- Rodney letters in 9th Report of Hist. manuscripts Coin., pt. iiL; "Memoirs," in Naval Chronicle, i. 353–93; and Charnock, Biographia Navalis, v. 204–28. Lord Rodney published in his lifetime (probably 1789)
- Letters to His Majesty's Ministers, etc., relative to St Eustatius, etc., of which there is a copy in the British Museum. Most of these letters are printed in Mundy's Life, vol. ii., though with many variant readings.

Parliament of Great Britain
Preceded by Stamp Brooksbank; Thomas Corbett	Member of Parliament for Saltash; 1751–1754; With: Stamp Brooksbank	Succeeded by Viscount Duncannon; George Clinton
Preceded by Thomas Potter; Robert Vyner	Member of Parliament for Okehampton; 1759–1761; With: Robert Vyner	Succeeded by Alexander Forrester; Wenman Coke
Preceded by John Plumptre; George Boscawen	Member of Parliament for Penryn; 1761–1768; With: Sir Edward Turner (1761–1766); Francis Basset (1761–1768)	Succeeded by Francis Basset; Hugh Pigot
Preceded by Lucy Knightley; Frederick Montagu	Member of Parliament for Northampton; 1769–1774; With: Sir George Osborn, Bt (1768–1769); Hon. Thomas Howe (1769–1771); Wilbraham Tollemache (1771–1774)	Succeeded by Sir George Robinson, Bt; Wilbraham Tollemache
Preceded by Viscount Malden; Lord Thomas Pelham-Clinton	Member of Parliament for Westminster; 1780–1782; With: Rt. Hon. Charles James Fox	Succeeded by Sir Cecil Wray, Bt; Rt. Hon. Charles James Fox
Political offices
Preceded by Charles Watson	Governor of Newfoundland; 1749–1749	Succeeded by Francis William Drake
Military offices
Preceded by Sir James Douglas	Commander-in-Chief, Leeward Islands Station; 1762–1763	Succeeded by Sir William Burnaby
Preceded by Arthur Forrest	Commander-in-Chief, Jamaica Station; 1771–1774	Succeeded by Clark Gayton
Preceded by Isaac Townsend	Governor, Greenwich Hospital; 1765–1770	Succeeded by Sir Francis Holburne
Preceded by Sir Hyde Parker	Commander-in-Chief, Leeward Islands Station; 1780–1781	Succeeded by Sir Samuel Hood
Preceded by Sir Samuel Hood	Commander-in-Chief, Leeward Islands Station; 1782	Succeeded by Hugh Pigot
Honorary titles
Preceded by Francis Holburne	Rear-Admiral of Great Britain; 1771–1781	Succeeded by George Darby
Preceded by The Lord Hawke	Vice-Admiral of Great Britain; 1781–1792	Succeeded by The Earl Howe
Peerage of Great Britain
New creation	Baron Rodney; 1782–1792	Succeeded by George Rodney
Baronetage of Great Britain
New creation	Baronet (of Alresford); 1764–1792	Succeeded by George Rodney
