= Hugh Pigot (Royal Navy officer, born 1722) =

Royal Navy Admiral of the White (1722–1792)

Admiral Hugh Pigot
- Born: 28 May 1722
- Died: 15 December 1792 (aged 70); Bristol, England
- Relatives: George Pigot (brother); Robert Pigot (brother); Henry Pigot (son); Hugh Pigot (son); Hugh Pigot (nephew)
- Military career
- Allegiance: Kingdom of Great Britain
- Branch: Royal Navy
- Service years: 1734–1783
- Rank: Admiral of the White
- Commands: HMS Vulcan; HMS Centaur; HMS Ludlow Castle; HMS York; HMS Royal William; HMS Triumph; Leeward Islands Station
- Conflicts: Seven Years' War; Siege of Louisburg; Capture of Quebec; American Revolutionary War

Admiral of the White Hugh Pigot (28 May 1722 – 15 December 1792), of Wychwood Forest in Oxfordshire, was a Royal Navy officer. He commanded York at the reduction of Louisbourg in June 1758 and commanded Royal William at the capture of Quebec in September 1759 during the Seven Years' War. He went on to serve as Commander-in-Chief of the Leeward Islands Station during the American Revolutionary War and then became First Naval Lord. He also served as a Member of Parliament.

== Naval career ==
=== Early career ===
Hugh Pigot was the third son of Richard Pigot of Westminster, by his wife Frances, daughter of Peter Goode, a Huguenot who had come to England in the late seventeenth century. His elder brothers were George Pigot, 1st Baron Pigot, who twice served as Governor of Madras, and Lieutenant-General Sir Robert Pigot, who commanded the left flank of the British forces at the Battle of Bunker Hill.

Pigot entered the navy in around 1735, serving for four years as a captain's servant and able seaman aboard the Captain under Captain Alexander Geddes on the home station, and then Seaford under Captain Savage Mostyn. He then served for another two years as a midshipman aboard the Seaford, Cumberland, and Russell. On 5 November 1741 he passed his examination, and on 9 February 1741/42 (OS) was promoted to lieutenant, and on 2 August was appointed to the Romney under Captain Thomas Grenville, in the Mediterranean.

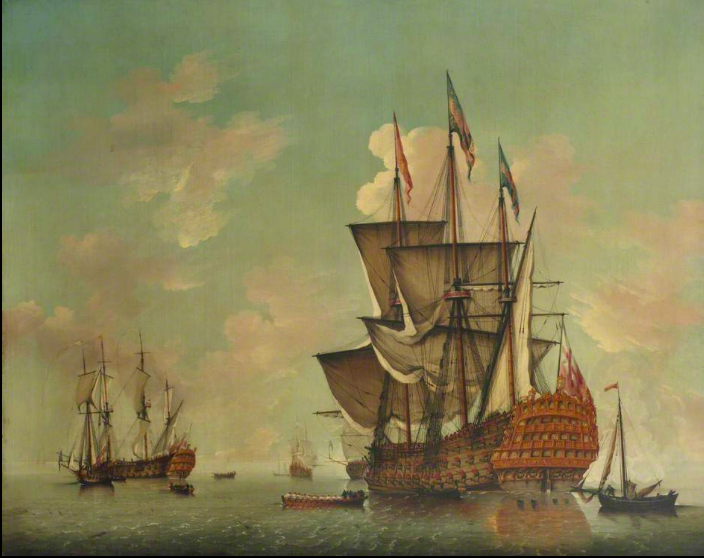
HMS Royal William which Pigot commanded at the capture of Quebec

In March 1744 he followed Grenville into Falkland on the home station, and on 2 November 1745 was promoted to commander of the fireship Vulcan. On 22 April 1746 he was appointed as post-captain into the Centaur, apparently for rank only, and in April 1747 was appointed to command of the Ludlow Castle in the West Indies. In 1755, he was appointed captain of the 60-gun York, one of the ships put into commission in anticipation of the war with France. In June 1758 he commanded York at the reduction of Louisbourg, and in September 1759 he commanded the 84-gun Royal William in the fleet of Sir Charles Saunders at the capture of Quebec. He was employed in Royal William for the remainder of the war in the Channel; and in May 1760, chased the Diadem, a French third rate of seventy-four guns, bound for Martinique with stores and specie for the payment of the soldiery, into the Groyne.

He saw no further service at sea following the conclusion of the war in 1763, but in 1769 was appointed colonel of the second (or Portsmouth) division of Marines; shortly before he had been chosen as representative in parliament for the borough of Penryn, a government-dominated borough which frequently chose distinguished naval officers as its MPs. (Pigot succeeded Vice-Admiral Sir George Rodney.) Pigot was a close friend of the Prime Minister, the Duke of Grafton, and this connection was cemented when Grafton married Elizabeth Wrottesley, sister of Pigot's second wife, Frances. Pigot represented Penryn until 1774, but did not contest the general election that year.

In January 1771 he was appointed to command of the Triumph, one of the ships commissioned during the dispute with Spain over the Falkland Islands. When the crisis was peaceably settled his ship was put out of commission, and Pigot held no subsequent commission as a captain.

=== Flag rank ===
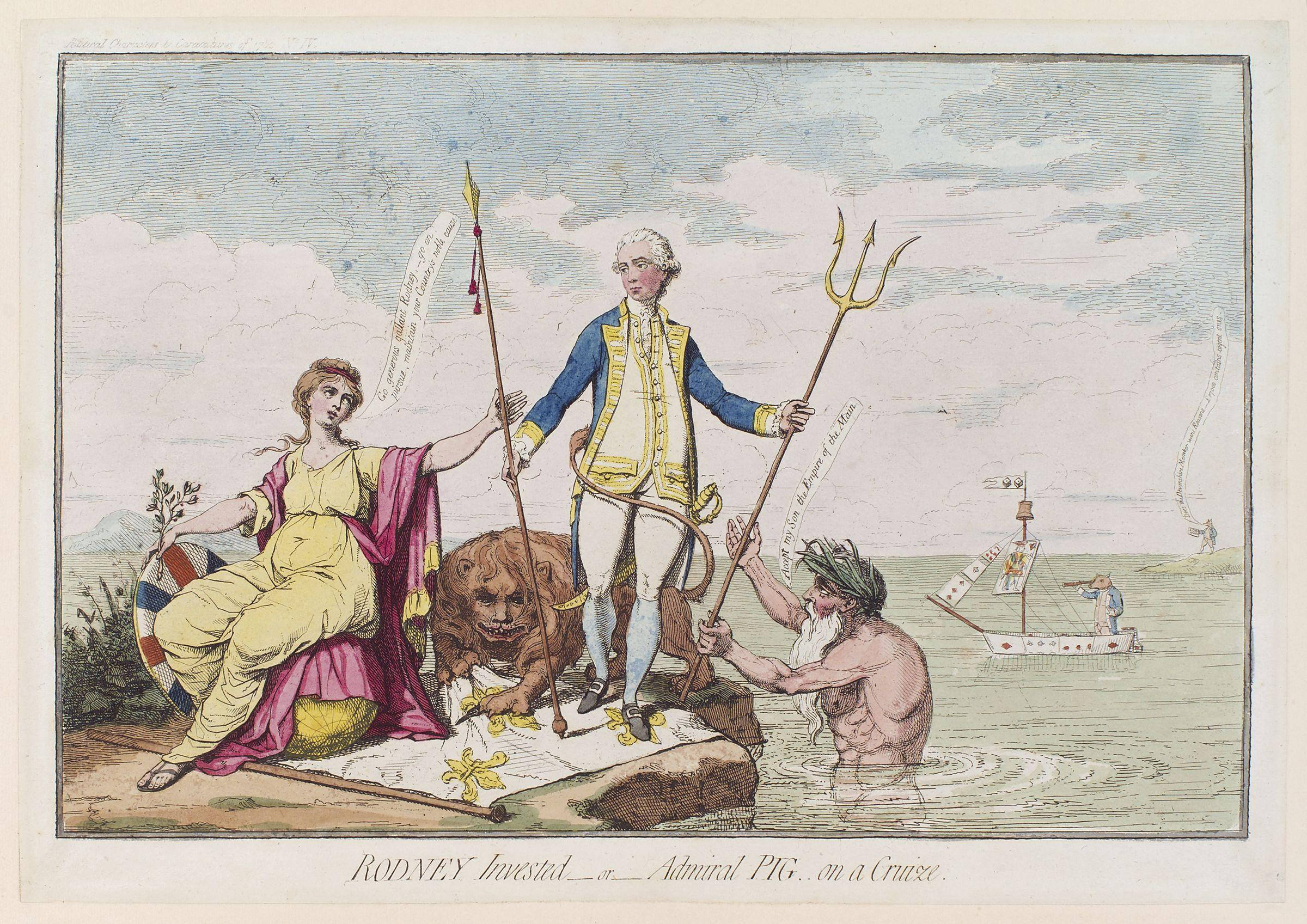
Pigot depicted as a pig sailing to take Rodney's command in 1782 as Rodney receives his rewards

He was promoted to rear-admiral on 31 March 1775 and to vice-admiral on 5 February 1776. In 1778, following the death of his brother, Lord George Pigot, he was elected to fill his seat in Bridgnorth.

By this time he was a consistent opponent of Lord North's government (he was a gaming crony of the Whig leader Charles James Fox), and seems to have been denied commands for political reasons. When Sheridan attacked the government in the Commons in February 1782 for driving the most distinguished naval commanders out of the service, it was Pigot who rose in answer to the invitation to give instances of the First Lord of the Admiralty's conduct towards officers who were his political opponents.

With the fall of the government the following month, on 30 March 1782 Pigot was appointed to the Board of Admiralty in the Second Rockingham ministry, and on 24 April 1782 was promoted to full admiral and appointed to supersede Sir George Rodney as commander-in-chief in the Leeward Islands Station. Pigot hoisted his flag on board the 50-gun Jupiter, and sailed from Plymouth on 18 May, only a day before the arrival of the frigate bringing the news of the defeat of the French fleet under Comte de Grasse at the Battle of the Saintes on 12 April. Although Rodney was neither in favour with the new ministry, nor a particularly popular commander, it was considered politic to allow him to remain in command and a message was sent after Pigot to recall him. However, it failed to arrive before he had assumed command at Jamaica on 13 July. His appointment was allowed to proceed, and Rodney received an apology and was made a Baron. Pigot, having hoisted his flag on board the 98-gun Formidable, then sailed, as was customary at that time, to America during the hurricane months.

Pigot had little experience as a captain, with none as an admiral. His second-in-command, Samuel Hood, seems to have regarded him with mixed feelings of pity and contempt, and considered that the government had acted unwisely "in placing an officer at the head of so great a fleet who was unequal to the very important command, for want of practice". In any event Pigot's term of command was uneventful, and following the signing of the peace treaty in September 1783, he returned to England. Pigot served as First Naval Lord from January 1783 to December 1783 and then retired from the Navy on 30 December 1783, and was defeated at Bridgnorth at the general election of 1784. Pigot lived in the Ranger's Lodge at Wychwood Forest in Oxfordshire exploiting the forest by demanding a firewood allowance from the keepers.

Pigot died at Bristol on 15 December 1792.

== Personal life ==
Pigot was twice married, firstly c.1749, to Elizabeth le Neve, by whom he had a son, General Sir Henry Pigot (1750–1840) and a daughter, and secondly c.1768 to Frances, the daughter of the Very Reverend Sir Richard Wrottesley, 7th Baronet, by whom he had a second son, Captain Hugh Pigot, RN, (1769–1797), and two daughters. He inherited a one-third share of the Pigot Diamond from his older brother, which remained in the family until sold in a lottery in 1801.

== Sources ==
- Concise Dictionary of National Biography. 1930.
- Rodger, N.A.M. (1979). The Admiralty. Offices of State. Lavenham: T. Dalton Ltd. ISBN 0900963948.

Parliament of Great Britain
Preceded by George Brydges Rodney; Francis Basset	Member of Parliament for Penryn; 1768–1774; With: Francis Basset 1768–1769; William Lemon 1770–1774	Succeeded by Sir George Osborn; William Chaytor
Preceded by Thomas Whitmore; The Lord Pigot	Member of Parliament for Bridgnorth; 1778–1784; With: Thomas Whitmore	Succeeded by Thomas Whitmore; Isaac Hawkins Browne
Military offices
Preceded by Sir George Brydges Rodney	Commander-in-Chief, Leeward Islands Station; 1782–1783	Succeeded by Sir Richard Hughes
Preceded by Sir Robert Harland	First Naval Lord; January 1783–December 1783	Succeeded by John Leveson-Gower
