= HMS Restoration (1706) =

Ship of the line of the Royal Navy

History

Great Britain
- Name: HMS Restoration
- Builder: Allin, Deptford Dockyard
- Launched: 1 August 1706
- Fate: Wrecked, 9 November 1711

General characteristics
- Class & type: 70-gun third rate ship of the line
- Tons burthen: 110648/94 (bm)
- Length: 151 ft (46.0 m) (gundeck)
- Beam: 41 ft (12.5 m)
- Depth of hold: 17 ft 6 in (5.3 m)
- Propulsion: Sails
- Sail plan: Full-rigged ship
- Armament: 70 guns of various weights of shot

HMS Restoration was a 70-gun third rate ship of the line of the Royal Navy, built by Joseph Allin the elder at Deptford Dockyard and launched on 1 August 1706, after the previous Restoration had been lost in the Great Storm of 1703.

This ship also had a premature end when she was wrecked off Livorno on 9 November 1711.
