= John Cox (Royal Navy officer, died 1672) =

Sir John Cox was an English Royal Navy officer of the seventeenth century.

Cox joined the Navy during the English Republican era, but remained following the Restoration of 1660. At one point, he served as Governor of Chatham.

During the Third Anglo-Dutch War, he was given command of HMS Prince, a hundred-gun first-rate ship of the line. Cox was also appointed Captain of the Fleet and knighted. He served as the Duke of York's flag captain during the Battle of Solebay against the Dutch. The Prince was involved in some of the heaviest fighting, and Cox was killed by an enemy shot while standing close to the Duke. He was succeeded in command of the ship by John Narborough.

== Bibliography ==
- Harris, Simon. Sir Cloudesley Shovell: Stuart Admiral. The History Press, 2001. ISBN 9781862270992
