= Joseph Allin =

English shipwright

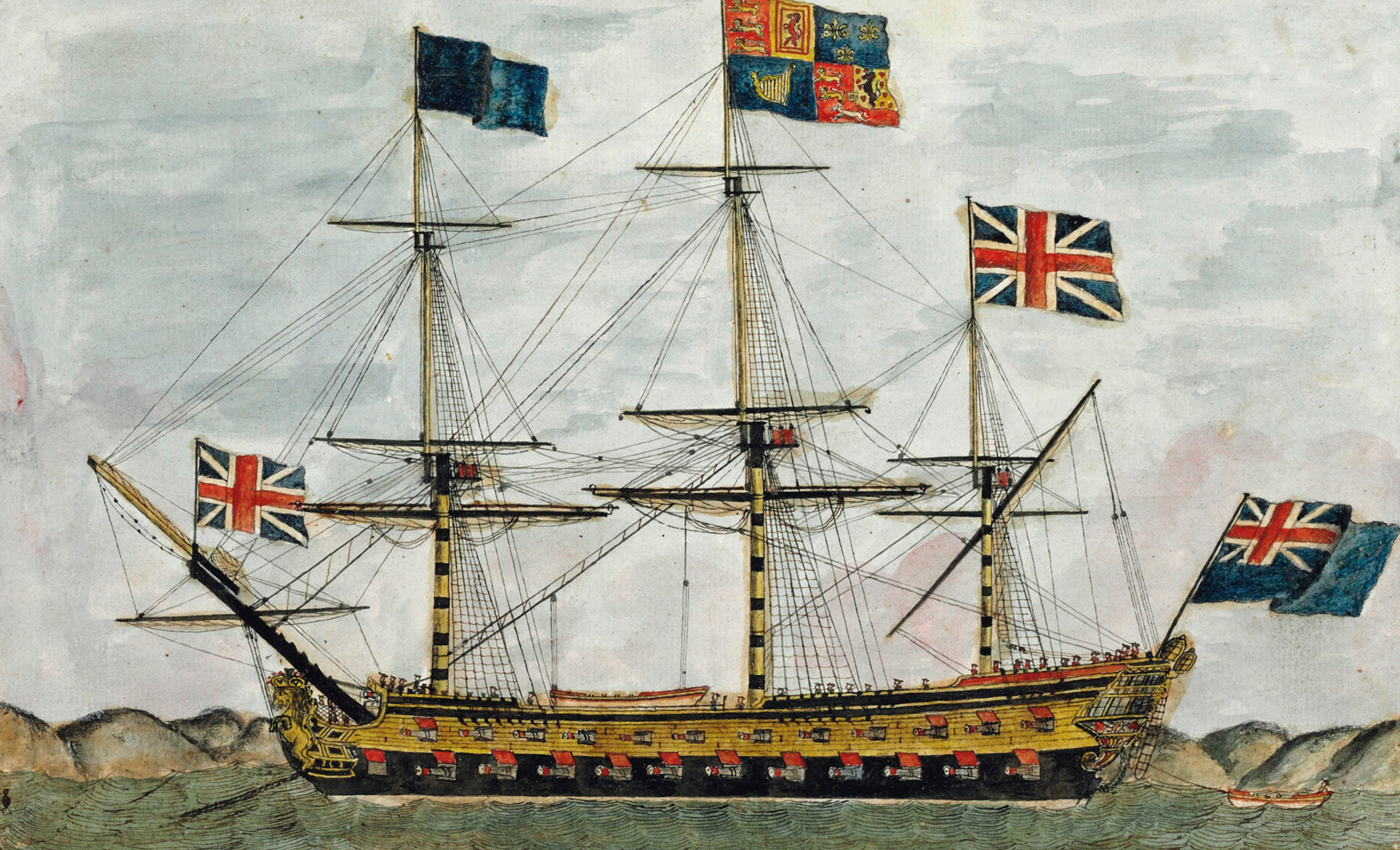
Chatham

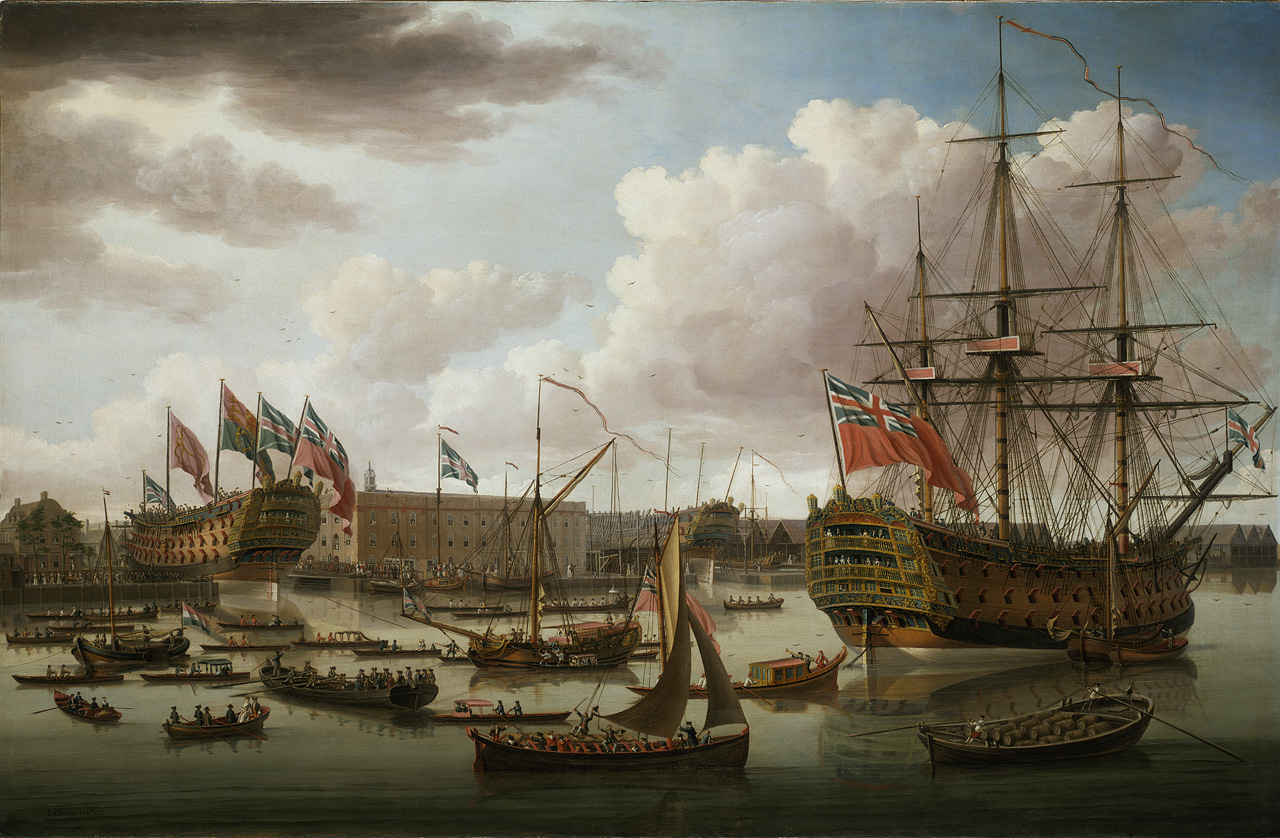
Cambridge under construction

Sir Joseph Allin (c. 1670 – 1716) was an English shipwright who worked for the Royal Navy. His works merge with those of his namesake son who was also a Master Shipwright at Portsmouth Dockyard and later Surveyor to the Navy. Joseph Allin the elder, first appears as "Assistant Master Shipwright" in Portsmouth in December 1700 as assistant to Elias Waffe. Typically this position followed at least seven years on a ship training and a further period serving as a ship's carpenter, bringing his probable age to around 30. As his son was born around 1690 it may be assumed that Joseph Allin the elder was born around 1670.

From 1701 to 1705 he served as Master Shipwright at Sheerness Dockyard and also dis some work overseeing Woolwich before settling as Master Shipwright of Deptford Dockyard in November 1705. Allin the elder died in 1716. His son had a parallel career but as Master Shipwright of different yards: Portsmouth 1726 to 1742 (in place of John Naish) and then Deptford from 1742 to 1746. Thereafter he served as Surveyor to the Navy initially with Jacob Ackworth and then alone, designing ships and arranging harbour improvements. As Surveyor to the Navy, he was knighted around 1750. Sir Joseph Allin retired in 1755 and died in 1759.

== Ships built by Allin the Elder ==
- HMS Newcastle 50-gun ship of the line launched at Sheerness in 1704
- Rebuild of HMS Ruby 50-gun ship of the line relaunched at Deptford in 1706
- HMS Restoration 70-gun ship of the line launched at Deptford in 1706
- HMS Colchester 54-gun ship of the line launched at Deptford in 1707
- HMS Portsmouth 42-gun ship of the line launched at Deptford in 1707
- HMS Resolution 70-gun ship of the line launched at Deptford in 1708
- HMS Ruby 54-gun ship of the line launched at Deptford in 1708
- Remodelling of HMS Mary Galley 42-gun frigate launched at Deptford in 1708
- HMS Fortune 24-gun storeship (to his own design) launched at Deptford in 1709
- Yacht "Dublin" launched in Deptford in 1709
- HMS Success 24-gun transport ship (to his own design) launched at Deptford in 1709
- HMS Margate 14-gun ship launched at Deptford in 1709
- HMS Jamaica 10-gun sloop launched at Deptford in 1710
- HMS Trial 10-gun sloop launched at Deptford in 1710
- HMS Cumberland 80-gun ship of the line launched at Deptford in 1710
- HMS Ferret 10-gun sloop launched at Deptford in 1711
- HMS Shark 10-gun sloop launched at Deptford in 1711
- HMS Ossory a huge 90-gun ship of the line launched at Deptford in 1711
- HMS Gloucester a 54-gun ship of the line launched at Deptford in 1711
- HMS Gibraltar 42-gun ship launched at Deptford in 1711
- HMS Port Mahon 42-gun ship launched at Deptford in 1711
- HMS Bideford 24-gun ship launched at Deptford in 1712
- HMS Advice 54-gun ship of the line launched at Deptford in 1712
- HMS Rippon 60-gun ship of the line launched at Deptford in 1712
- HMS Shrewsbury 80-gun ship of the line launched at Portsmouth in 1713
- Remodelling of HMS Worcester 54-gun ship of the line relaunched at Deptford in 1714

== Ships built by Allin the Younger ==
- Rebuilding of HMS Oxford 50-gun ship of the line rebuilt at Portsmouth (1727)
- Rebuilding of HMS Ipswich 70-gun ship of the line rebuilt at Portsmouth (1730)
- HMS Centurion 60-gun ship of the line built at Portsmouth (1732)
- Rebuilding of HMS Dunkirk 60-gun ship of the line rebuilt at Portsmouth (1734)
- HMS Worcester 60-gun ship of the line built at Portsmouth (1735)
- HMS Bedford 70-gun ship of the line built at Portsmouth (1741)
- Rebuilding of HMS Monmouth 70-gun ship of the line rebuilt at Portsmouth (1742)
- HMS Berwick 70-gun ship of the line built at Deptford (1743)
- Remodelling of HMS Hampton Court 64-gun ship of the line built at Rotherhithe (1744)
- HMS Yarmouth 64-gun ship of the line built at Deptford (1745)
- HMS Kent 64-gun ship of the line built at Deptford (1746)

== Ships designed by Allin the Younger ==
- HMS Yarmouth 64-gun ship of the line designed in 1742
- Hind-class sloop, designed in 1743
- HMS Mermaid designed in 1748
- HMS Peggy 1749
- Yacht "Royal Caroline" 1750
- HMS Chichester 68-gun ship of the line designed in 1750
- HMS Princess Amelia 80-gun ship of the line designed in 1751
- Yacht "Dorset" 1752
- HMS Rippon 60-gun ship of the line designed in 1752
- HMS Chatham 50-gun ship of the line designed in 1752
- HMS Pembroke 60-gun ship of the line designed in 1753
- Hawk-class sloop designed in 1755
- HMS Cambridge 80-gun ship of the line designed in 1755 (later built by Adam Hayes)
