= Francis Basset (1715–1769) =

Arms of Basset: Barry wavy of six or and gules

Francis Basset (1715–1769) of Tehidy in the parish of Illogan, Cornwall, was a Westcountry landowner who served as a member of parliament for Penryn, Cornwall, in (1766–69).

== Origins ==
He was the son of Francis Basset (1674–1721) of Tehidy, Sheriff of Cornwall in 1708, by his wife Mary Pendarves. The Basset family was an ancient Westcountry family.

== Marriage and children ==
He married Margaret St Aubyn, a daughter of Sir John St Aubyn, 3rd Baronet, by whom he had seven children, two sons and five daughters, including:

- Francis Basset, 1st Baron de Dunstanville and Basset (1757–1835) of Tehidy, eldest son and heir.

Parliament of Great Britain
Preceded by Edward Turner; George Brydges Rodney	Member of Parliament for Penryn; 1766–1769; With: George Brydges Rodney (1766–1768)/ Hugh Pigot (1768–1769)	Succeeded by William Lemon; Hugh Pigot
