= Rodney boat =

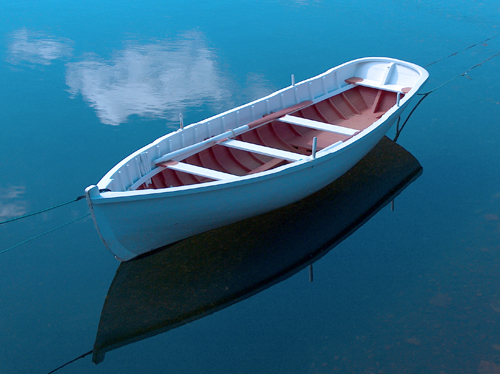
A rodney anchored off the shores of Twillingate, Newfoundland

A rodney or punt is a small Newfoundland wooden boat typically used by one man for hook and line fishing, for squid jigging, for travelling settlement to settlement, to shop, or to get out to their powered fishing boats. When towed behind a larger boat as a convenience in going from the larger boat to shore, a rodney was called a go-ashore.

Rodneys are of simple design. Most builders used only three patterns to create the entire boat. These were varied a bit by the dimensions of the particular boat to be built. The bow stem and the mid boat frames used the same pattern.
