= HMS Prince (1670) =

Ship of the line of the Royal Navy

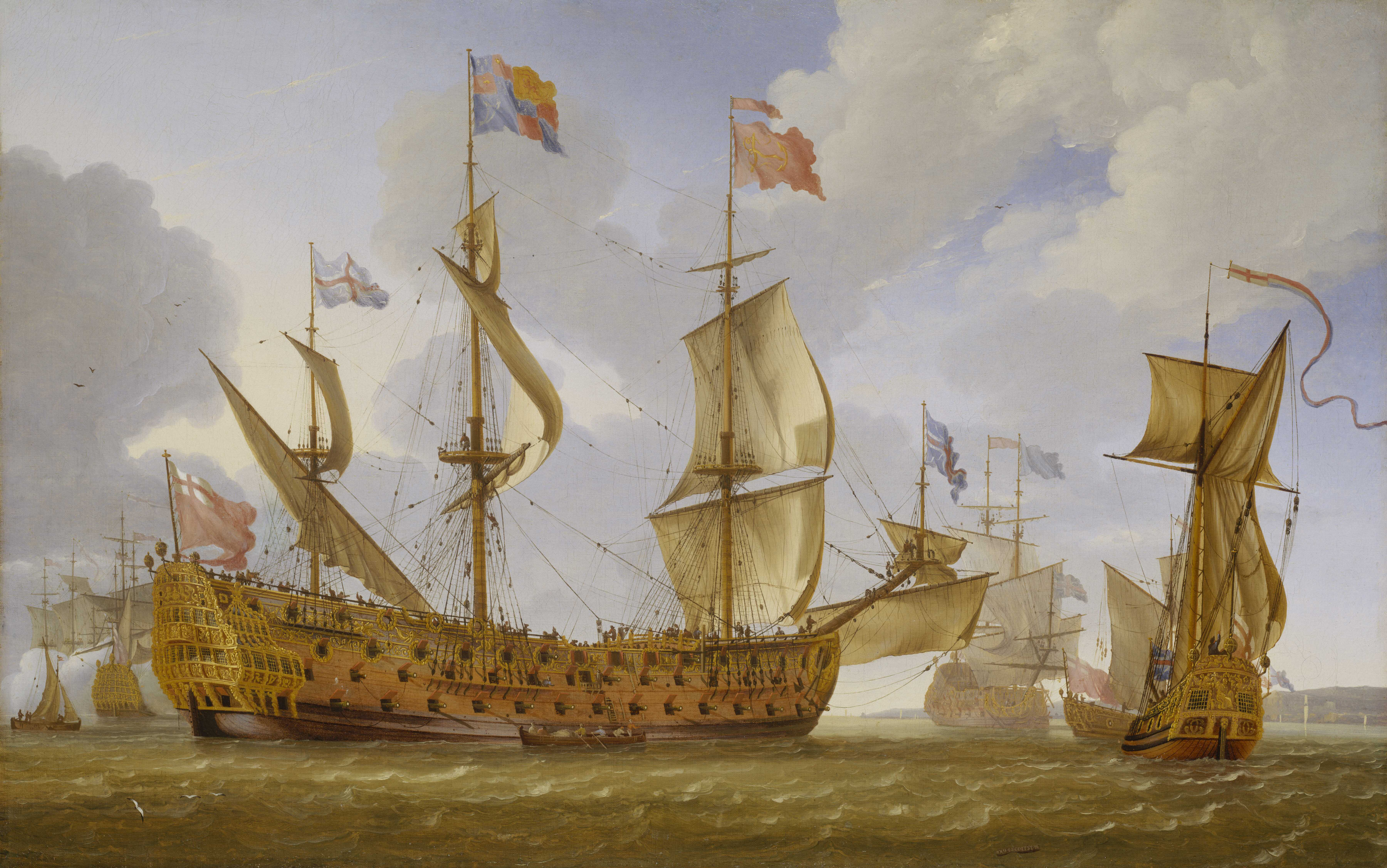

History

England
- Name: Prince
- Ordered: June 1667
- Builder: Phineas Pett the Younger, Deptford Dockyard
- Launched: 3 December 1670
- Commissioned: 15 January 1672
- Renamed: Royal William, 1692
- Reclassified: Cut down into a second rate, 8 August 1757; As a receiving ship, May 1790
- Fate: Broken up, August 1813

General characteristics
- Class & type: 100-gun first rate ship of the line
- Tons burthen: 1403 (bm)
- Length: 131 ft (40 m) (keel)
- Beam: 44 ft 10 in (13.67 m)
- Depth of hold: 19 ft (5.8 m)
- Propulsion: Sails
- Sail plan: Full-rigged ship
- Armament: 100 guns of various weights of shot

General characteristics (1692)
- Class & type: 100-gun first rate ship of the line
- Tons burthen: 1463 73/94 (bm)
- Length: 167 ft 3 in (50.98 m) (gundeck)
- Beam: 47 ft 2 in (14.38 m)
- Depth of hold: 18 ft (5.5 m)
- Propulsion: Sails
- Sail plan: Full-rigged ship
- Armament: 100 guns of various weights of shot

General characteristics (1719)
- Class & type: 100-gun first rate ship of the line
- Tons burthen: 1918 23/94 (bm)
- Length: 175 ft 4 in (53.44 m) (gundeck)
- Beam: 50 ft (15 m)
- Depth of hold: 20 ft 1 in (6.12 m)
- Propulsion: Sails
- Sail plan: Full-rigged ship
- Armament: 100 guns of various weights of shot

HMS Prince (also referred to as Royal Prince) was a 100-gun first rate ship of the line of the Royal Navy, built by Phineas Pett the Younger at Deptford Dockyard and launched in 1670.

== History ==
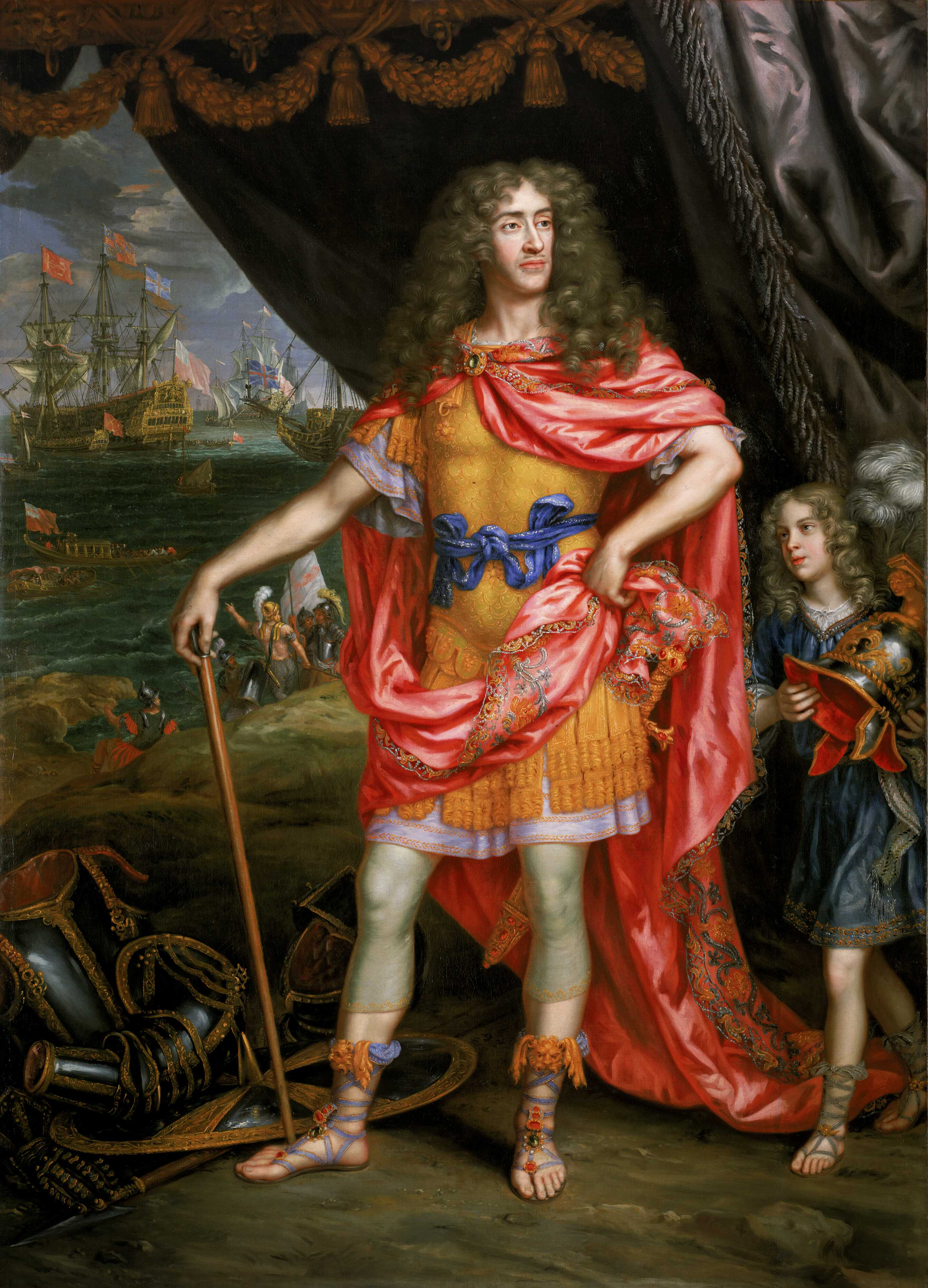
Portrait of James, Duke of York by Henry Gascar, 1673. The ship can be seen in the background of the painting.

During the Third Anglo-Dutch War she served as a flagship of the Lord High Admiral the Duke of York (later James II & VII.) During the Battle of Solebay (1672) she was in the centre of the English fleet that was attacked by the Dutch centre led by Admiral Michiel de Ruyter. Prince was heavily damaged by De Ruyter's flagship De Zeven Provinciën in a two hours' duel and Captain of the Fleet Sir John Cox was killed on board. The Duke of York was forced to shift his flag to HMS St Michael. Prince's second captain, John Narborough, however conducted himself with such conspicuous valour that he won special approbation and was knighted shortly afterwards.

HMS Prince was rebuilt by Robert Lee at Chatham Dockyard in 1692, and renamed at the same time as HMS Royal William. During the War of the Grand Alliance the ship saw action at the Battle of Barfleur of 19 May 1692. Prince belonged to the red squadron and carried the flag of Rear-admiral of the red Sir Cloudesley Shovell. She was the first ship to break the French line during the battle.

Later she was rebuilt for a second time by John Naish of Portsmouth but using Chatham Dockyard from 1714, relaunching on 3 September 1719. She was laid up after her re-launch and saw no service at all until she was reduced to an 84-gun second-rate ship in 1756. One year later, she was part of an unsuccessful expedition against Rochefort led by Admiral Sir Edward Hawke. Her squadron, under Vice-Admiral Charles Knowles, attacked the Île-d'Aix and forced her garrison to surrender. In 1758 she participated in Boscawen's and Wolfe's attack on the French Fortress of Louisbourg (Nova Scotia) and an indecisive skirmish with a French squadron. The following year Royal William returned to Canada under the command of Captain Hugh Pigot to join the attack on Quebec. After the Battle of the Plains of Abraham and the capture of Quebec she sailed back to England with the body of General Wolfe. In 1760 Royal William was Boscawen's flagship when he took command of the fleet in Quiberon Bay. However, after a severe gale he was forced to return and shift his flag to HMS Namur. During the expedition against Belle Île of 1761 she was detached with several other ships to cruise off Brest and prevent a French counter-attack from there.

Royal William was recommissioned in May 1782 during the American Revolutionary War and participated in Admiral Lord Richard Howe's relief of Gibraltar later that year. The ship was converted into a receiving ship in May 1790. She was broken up in August 1813.

== Commanders of Note ==
- Wittewronge Taylor 1757/8
- Hugh Pigot 1759 to 1763
- Samuel Hood briefly in 1771
- George Gayton 1790 to 1794
- Francis Pickmore 1794 to 1801
- Courtnay Boyle

== Bibliography ==
- Clowes, W. L. (1996a). The Royal Navy. A History from the Earliest Times to 1900. Vol. 2.
- Clowes, W. L. (1996b). The Royal Navy. A History from the Earliest Times to 1900. Vol. 3.
- Lavery, Brian (1984). The Ship of the Line. Vol. 1: The Development of the Battlefleet 1650-1850. Naval Institute Press. ISBN 0-85177-252-8.
- Winfield, Rif (2007). British Warships in the Age of Sail 1714–1792: Design, Construction, Careers and Fates. Seaforth Publishing. ISBN 978-1-84415-700-6.
- Winfield, Rif (2008) [2005]. British Warships in the Age of Sail 1793–1817: Design, Construction, Careers and Fates (2nd, revised ed.). Seaforth. ISBN 978-1-84415-717-4.
