= John Naish (shipbuilder) =

John Naish (died 1726) was an 18th-century shipbuilder to the Royal Navy mainly based at Portsmouth Dockyard. He first appears in Royal Navy records in February 1705 as Assistant Master Shipwright. Typically this would have followed at least seven years at sea training as a ships carpenter and a period on shore, and most at this stage are of age at least 30.

In August 1709 he was appointed Master Shipwright of Harwich and in December 1711 was moved to Sheerness. He worked briefly in Woolwich where in 1714 he redesigned the huge HMS Royal William, before settling in the prestigious role as Master of Portsmouth Dockyard in July 1715 in place of Richard Stacey.

In 1721 Sir Jacob Ackworth sent him plans for the rebuilding of HMS Victory but these were not executed and the project was instead addressed by his successor Joseph Allin.

He died suddenly in December 1726 aged around 50. His will was concluded in March 1727 and is now held at the National Archive in Kew.

== Ships built ==
- HMS Montagu a 60-gun ship of the line built at Woolwich Dockyard in 1716
- HMS Nonsuch a 50-gun ship of the line built at Portsmouth in 1717
- HMS Salisbury a 50-gun ship of the line built at Deptford in 1717
- Rebuilding of HMS Monmouth a 70-gun ship of the line rebuilt at Portsmouth in 1717
- Rebuilding of HMS Kingston a 60-gun ship of the line rebuilt at Portsmouth in 1717
- HMS Royal William a 90-gun ship of the line designed and built at Chatham in 1719
- "Old Truelove" a Hoy at Portsmouth in 1720
- HMS Spy an 8-gun sloop designed and built by Naish in 1721
- Rebuilding of HMS Captain a 70-gun ship of the line rebuilt at Portsmouth in 1722
- Rebuilding of HMS Canterbury a 60-gun ship of the line rebuilt at Portsmouth in 1722
- Rebuilding of HMS Portland a 50-gun ship of the line rebuilt at Portsmouth in 1723
- HMS Dreadnought a 60-gun ship of the line built at Portsmouth in 1723
- HMS Lowestoffe a 20-gun frigate built at Portsmouth in 1723
- HMS Kinsale a 40-gun ship built at Portsmouth in 1724
- HMS Southsea Castle a 40-gun ship built at Portsmouth in 1724
- HMS Adventure a 40-gun ship of the line built at Portsmouth in 1726
- Rebuilding of HMS Salisbury a 50-gun ship of the line rebuilt at Portsmouth in 1726
