= William Naish (painter) =

English miniature painter (1766/7–1800)

William Naish (1766/7–1800) was an English miniature painter.

== Life ==
William Naish was born in Axbridge, Somerset, and practised with success in London. He exhibited at the Royal Academy almost continuously from 1783 until his death in 1800. His portraits of Morton the dramatist and Mrs. Twisleton and Mrs. Wells, actresses, were engraved by Ridley for the Monthly Mirror.

His brother, John Naish, was also a miniaturist, and exhibited in London in 1790 and 1795.

== Gallery ==
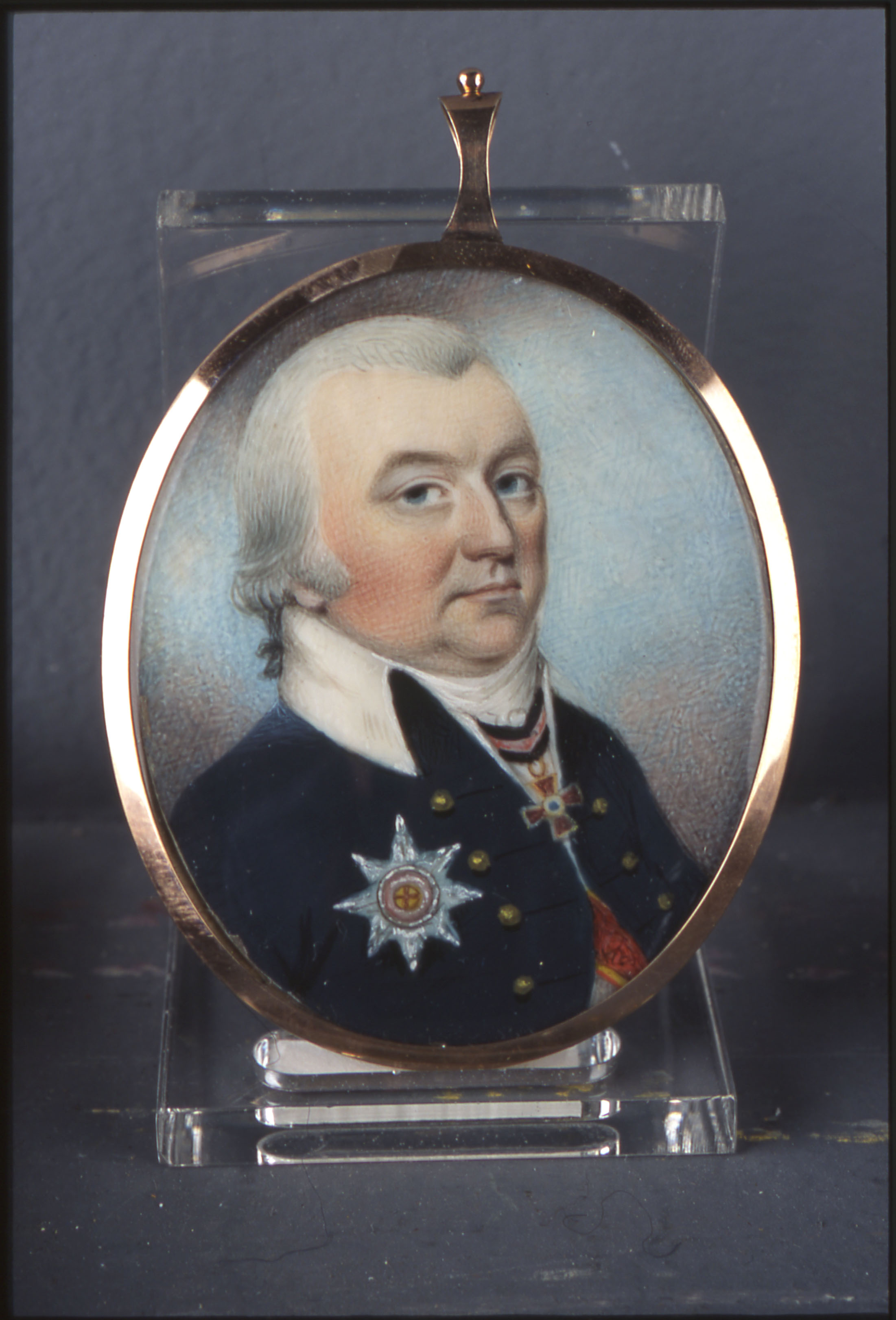
Admiral George Tate (c. 1795)

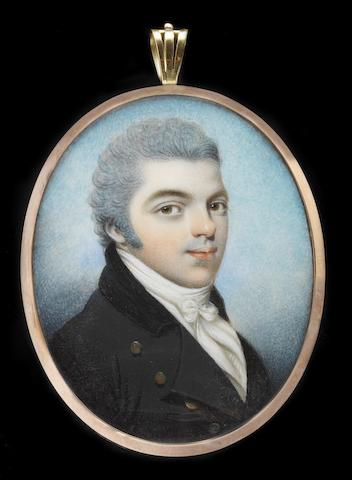
Samuel Burgess (c. 1767–1800)

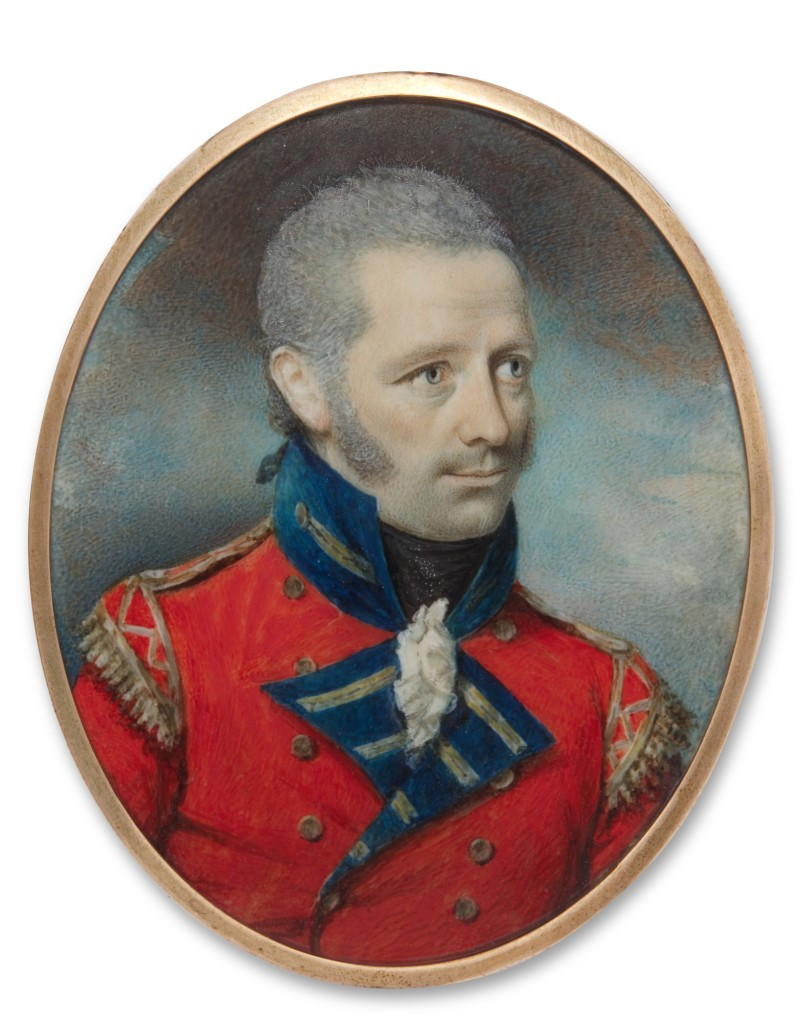
Portrait of an officer (c. 1800)

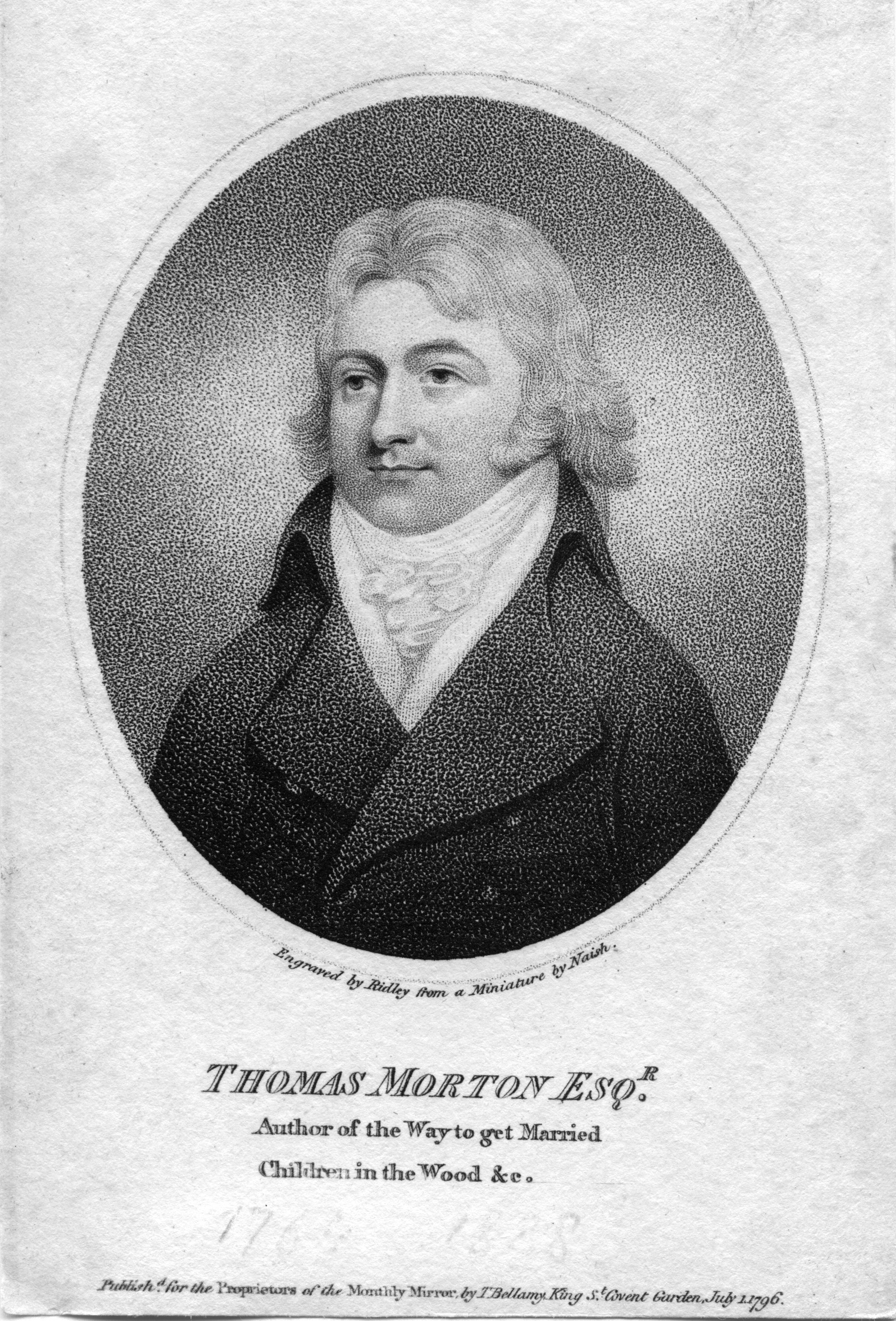
T. Morton, engraved by Ridley after Naish (1796)

== Sources ==
- Beyer, Andreas; Savoy, Bénédicte; Tegethoff, Wolf, eds. (2021). "Naish, William". Allgemeines Künstlerlexikon – International Artist Database – Online. Berlin, New York: K.G. Saur. Retrieved 15 September 2022 – via De Gruyter.
- Oliver, Valerie Cassel, ed. "Naish, John". Benezit Dictionary of Artists. Oxford University Press. Retrieved 15 September 2022 – via Oxford Art Online.
- Oliver, Valerie Cassel, ed. "Naish, William". Benezit Dictionary of Artists. Oxford University Press. Retrieved 15 September 2022 – via Oxford Art Online.
- O'Donoghue, F. M.; Peach, Annette (2004). "Naish, William (1766/7–1800), miniature painter". Oxford Dictionary of National Biography. Oxford University Press. Retrieved 15 September 2022.

Attribution:

- This article incorporates text from a publication now in the public domain: O'Donoghue, Freeman Marius (1894). "Naish, William (d.1800)". In Lee, Sidney (ed.). Dictionary of National Biography. Vol. 40. London: Smith, Elder & Co. p. 28.
