= William Naish (Quaker) =

English Quaker and slavery abolitionist (1785–1860)

William Naish (1785–1860) was an English Quaker writer and abolitionist.

== Life ==
William Naish, son of Francis Naish, silversmith, by Susanna, his wife, was born in High Street, Bath, on 9 March 1785. Coming to London, he opened a haberdasher's shop in Gracechurch Street. He interested himself in the anti-slavery movement, and published a large number of tracts and pamphlets in favour of that cause. During 1829 and 1830 he opened a depository at his shop in Gracechurch Street for the sale of these and other publications. He afterwards lived at Maidstone and at Bath, where he died on 4 March 1860, aged 75. He was buried in the Friends' burial-ground at Widcombe Hill, near Bath.

== Personal ==
He married Frances, daughter of Jasper Capper, and sister of Samuel Capper, author of The Acknowledged Doctrines of the Church of Rome, London, 1849. His son, Arthur John Naish (1816–1889), was co-founder with Paul Bevan (a cousin of Joseph Gurney Bevan) of the Bevan-Naish Library of Friends' books, later deposited in the library, Dr. Johnson Passage, Birmingham.

== Works ==
Naish's chief publications, nearly all undated, are:

1. The Negro's Remembrancer, in thirteen numbers; many of the later numbers ran to second and third editions.
2. The Negro's Friend, in twenty-six numbers.
3. A Short History of the Poor Black Slaves who are employed in cultivating Sugar, Cotton, Coffee, &c. Intended to make little Children in England pity them, and use their Endeavours to relieve them from Bondage.
4. Reasons for using East Indian Sugar, 1828: this proceeded to a fifth edition.
5. A Brief Description of the Toil and Sufferings of Slaves in the British Sugar Colonies … by several Eye-witnesses.
6. The Negro Mother's Appeal (in verse).
7. A Comparison between Distressed English Labourers and the Coloured People and Slaves of the West Indies, from a Jamaica Paper.
8. Plead the Cause of the Poor and Needy.
9. The Advantages of Free Labour over the Labour of Slaves. Elucidated in the Cultivation of Pimento, Ginger, and Sugar.
10. Biographical Anecdotes: Persons of Colour, in five numbers.
11. A Sketch of the African Slave Trade, and the Slavery of Negroes under their Christian Masters in the European Colonies.
12. Sketches from the History of Pennsylvania, 1845.
13. The Fulfilment of the Prophecy of Isaiah, &c., London, 1853.
14. George Fox and his Friends as Leaders in the Peace Cause, London, 1859.

A tale, The Negro Slave, 1830, 8vo, was also attributed to Naish in the British Museum Catalogue; but from the preface it is given as the work of a lady.

== Sources ==
- Fell-Smith, Charlotte; Spence, Peter (2004). "Naish, William (1785–1860), slavery abolitionist". Oxford Dictionary of National Biography. Oxford University Press. Retrieved 15 September 2022.

Attribution:

- This article incorporates text from a publication now in the public domain: Fell Smith, Charlotte (1894). "Naish, William (1785-1860)". In Lee, Sidney (ed.). Dictionary of National Biography. Vol. 40. London: Smith, Elder & Co. pp. 28–29.
