= John Naish (writer) =

Welsh-Australian writer (1923–1963)

- Naish cutting cane, c. 1960–1961
- Born: 20 April 1923; Port Talbot, Glamorganshire, Wales
- Died: 19 July 1963 (aged 40); Queensland, Australia

John Naish (20 April 1923 – 19 July 1963) was a Welsh-Australian playwright and author known for his writing about life on the sugarcane fields of north Queensland.

Naish was born in Glamorganshire in 1923 and migrated to Australia through an assisted passage scheme in 1950. He began working as a cane cutter in Queensland, where he also wrote fiction and plays. He spent a period living in Fiji working as a shipping clerk and became engaged to an Australian-born doctor. They returned to Queensland, where Naish resumed working as a cane cutter and continued writing. The family eventually moved to Cooktown, where Naish became a full-time writer and published two novels and an autobiography. In 1963, soon after the publication of his second novel, Naish died by suicide.

Naish's writing was largely forgotten after his death and remained in obscurity for many decades, and was rediscovered by scholars in the early 2020s. His writing, which included two novels, an autobiography, and a number of plays, depicted life on Queensland's sugarcane fields. Naish's writing was critical of worker exploitation and often included anti-war and environmentalist themes. His writing also highlighted the treatment of women, Indigenous Australians, and migrants in post-war Queensland, and criticised the role of the sugar industry in the dispossession of Aboriginal communities.

== Life ==
John Naish was the son of a Welsh carpenter and former Navy serviceman named William John Frederick Naish and his wife, a primary school teacher named Sarah Ann (née Griffiths). He was born in Port Talbot, Glamorganshire, on 20 April 1923. Naish attended Eastern Primary School and Port Talbot Secondary School, where he played rugby and cricket and was taught by Philip Henry Burton, who encouraged his interest in theatre and literature. At the age of 16, Naish began working as an articled clerk to a chartered accountant. He joined the Welsh Guards in May 1942 but did not serve in combat, possibly due to serious burns suffered during a tank fire. He served in Norway and Germany in the years following the war. Naish was discharged in March 1947 and began working for a sales company in Swansea before moving to London in October 1948 to work for a theatre management company. In 1949 he applied for assisted passage to Australia under a scheme that allowed British citizens to migrate for just £10.

In May 1950 Naish left Britain and migrated to Queensland, Australia, where he began working as a sugarcane cutter in north Queensland. Between harvest seasons he also worked as a miner, gravedigger, fruit-picker, barman, and manual labourer. While working as a cane cutter, Naish began writing. When he had lived in Australia long enough to satisfy the conditions of his assisted passage, he left Australia in February 1956 with the intention of returning home to Britain. He stopped over in Fiji to work as a shipping clerk, where he met an Australian doctor named Rosemary Ruth West. Naish and West became engaged, and by January 1958 West was pregnant; they returned to Australia to be married.

After their marriage in 1958, Naish and his wife returned to Queensland, where he resumed working as a cane cutter. They lived in the cane cutters' barracks at Babinda, where Rosemary Naish cooked for the workers and helped to type her husband's writing. There, they had their first son, Guy, on 7 September 1958. In 1959 they moved to Cairns and then to Atherton. On 12 June of that year the family travelled from Sydney to Naish's hometown of Port Talbot, where they had their second son, Lee. During their time in Britain, Naish signed a contract with the publisher Hutchinson for his autobiography The Clean Breast under a scheme that had been established to support debut authors. In April the family returned to Australia, where Naish resumed working as a cane cutter and continued writing.

Naish and his family eventually moved to Cooktown in North Queensland. He became a full-time writer and joined a local amateur theatre group, while his wife worked as the medical superintendent at the local hospital. Naish published three books—including the novels The Cruel Field in 1962 and That Men Should Fear in 1963—and a play. Some of his plays were performed by small theatre groups, and in 1962 he won the Far North Queensland Amateur Theatrical Association playwriting competition for his play The Maoris. Naish, who had long suffered recurrent episodes of depression, began to experience worsening symptoms of mental illness, and in April 1963 he was admitted to the psychiatric ward at North Ryde Hospital in Sydney. He ultimately spent three months in hospital. Shortly after he was discharged, he died by suicide on 19 July 1963 after overdosing on barbiturates.

== Writing ==
Naish wrote two novels, The Cruel Field and That Men Should Fear, as well as an autobiography, The Clean Breast. He wrote about fifteen plays (two of which were published), and at least one unpublished short story. His novels and plays drew on his experience as a cane cutter and depicted the landscape of tropical northern Queensland, including its heat, remoteness, natural landscape, and class relations. The historian Bianka Vidonja Balanzategui writes that Naish's writing condemned the dispossession and mistreatment of Indigenous Australians, as well as the treatment of women, in a manner that was uncommon for his era. Naish's writing also criticised war, environmental degradation, and the exploitation of workers. Many of his plays feature characters suffering from mental illness and post-traumatic stress disorder. Balanzategui argues that Naish's fiction also serves as an important historical text for understanding the poorly recorded labour practices of cane cutting in north Queensland in the post-war era.

Naish's first novel The Cruel Field, initially titled Mark the Syrup and the Ashes, describes a 1951 sugarcane harvest season in a fictional town in northern Queensland. Balanzategui has suggested that it may have been the first novel to provide a first-hand account of life as a cane cutter, while the literary scholar Elizabeth Smyth writes that the novel offers a unique level of insight into life on the canefields. The novel was considered by contemporary reviewers to be a masculine novel about physical labour and male friendship, but has been re-interpreted by modern scholars as a novel notable for its portrayals of the experiences of Indigenous Australians, women, and migrants on the canefields. To Balanzategui, the novel provides an acknowledgement of institutionalised racism and the role that the sugar industry played in the dispossession of Aboriginal communities. Smyth interprets the novel in the context of the georgic mode or pastoral ideal, writing that the novel demonstrates the relationship between seasons, land, and labour in the context of the Queensland tropics. To the scholars Cheryl Taylor and Elizabeth Perkins, the novel is a work of social realism with a "working-class orientation" and a tendency to romanticise the character of the cane cutter.

Naish's second novel, That Men Should Fear, follows a man named Jim Pearce who is raised on a Queensland sugarcane farm. Smyth writes that the novel is notable for presenting a woman farmer named Mary Vaughn, the daughter of a neighbouring farming family who inherits their property, as an educated, independent, and intelligent character; she notes that such female characters are uncommon in Australian farming novels. The novel depicts the changing role of women in rural Australia in the post-war era, with Jim's mother limited to a domestic role while his love interest Mary is a university-educated doctor and the sole owner of a successful farm. Smyth adds that the novel includes themes of class inequality, with Mary (the daughter of a landowning family) achieving success while Jim fails to rise out of poverty despite their otherwise similar backgrounds.

Naish's writing was largely forgotten after his death, but began to attract greater interest from scholars around 2021. The literary scholar Elizabeth Smyth has suggested that Naish's writing is part of a broader genre of literature connected to the Australian canefields. Many of Naish's works have been digitised and collated into the John Naish Archive by James Cook University.

== Bibliography ==
Bibliography compiled by Bianka Vidonja Balanzategui:

=== Books ===
- The Clean Breast: An Autobiography in Eleven Episodes (Hutchinson, 1961)
- The Cruel Field (Hutchinson, 1962)
- That Men Should Fear (Hutchinson, 1963)

=== Plays ===
- Mark, the Syrup and the Ashes
- The Strange Black Creates
- The Maoris (1962)
- The Claw (Rigby Limited, 1962)
- That Men Should Fear
- Cutters at White Road
- Deuteronomy 24-1 (Tasmanian Adult Education Board, 1957)
- Picture Night
- The Factory
- Peace Polony
- The Lease of Life
- The Paul Davis Affair
- Oliver in Aden: A Play for Voices (1960)
- The Auditors
- Woman at Sundown
- Glamour
