= Middlesbrough College =

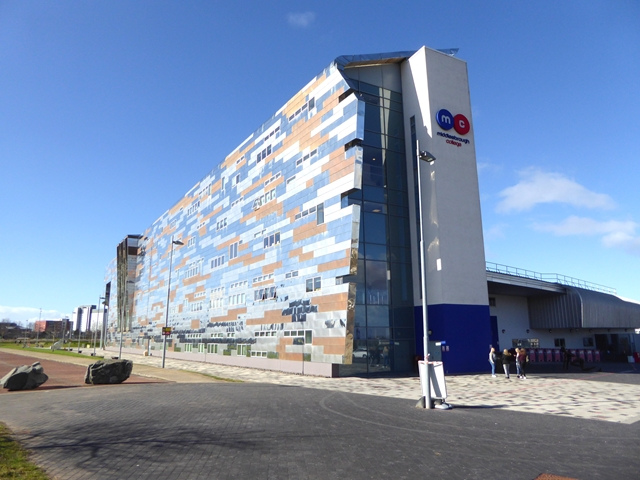

Location
- Middlehaven; Dock Street; Middlesbrough, North Yorkshire, TS2 1AD; England; 54°34′48″N 1°13′41″W

Information
- Type: Further education college
- Established: 1 August 1995
- Local authority: Middlesbrough
- Department for Education URN: 130570 Tables
- Ofsted: Reports
- Principal: Zoe Lewis
- Gender: Mixed
- Age: 16+
- Enrolment: 14,232 (2013/14)
- Opened by: Prince Andrew, Duke of York (Middlehaven Site)
- Website: http://www.mbro.ac.uk

Middlesbrough College, located on one campus at Middlehaven, Middlesbrough, North Yorkshire, England, is the largest college on Teesside.

== Admissions ==
It provides predominantly further education, but also selected higher education provision, and until 2008, existed on four different sites across the town (Marton, Acklam, Kirby and Longlands). Relocation to Middlehaven was one of Tees Valley Regeneration's major redevelopment projects.

It is situated just north of the A66 and Middlesbrough town centre, next to Middlesbrough Dock and the dock tower, and close to the Transporter Bridge and Middlesbrough FC's Riverside Stadium. The college is approximately 0.5 miles (1 km) from Middlesbrough railway station.

Student numbers during the 2013/14 college year were 14,232 (2013/14 annual report). Further annual reports state that there are over 13,000 students (during the 2020/21 college year) and over 12,000 students (during the 2022/23 college year).

== History and estates ==
=== Former schools ===
Three of the pre-2008 sites were those of the former grammar schools when run by the Middlesbrough Education Committee:

- Middlesbrough High School (Boys) – opened in October 1870 as a fee-paying school.
- Middlesbrough High School (Girls) – opened in August 1874. A joint new building was opened on Albert Road in 1877, but the boys and girls were taught separately. The central Middlesbrough site was in use until 1960, and then moved to Marton Road.
- the girls-only Kirby Grammar School - opened in October 1911 on the corner of Roman Road and Orchard Road in Linthorpe.
- the boys-only Acklam Hall Grammar School for Boys – opened in September 1935 when the numbers at Middlesbrough High School for Boys outgrew the capacity of the buildings.

Middlesbrough High School for Girls had 450 girls in the 1950s, and 600 in 1962. Middlesbrough High School for Boys had around 450 boys in the 1950s, and 600 in the mid-1960s. The boys' and girls' schools, both three-form entry schools, merged in September 1967 to form Middlesbrough High School, an ages 13–18 comprehensive with around 1,200 boys and girls and 500 in the sixth form. Middlesbrough High School became Middlesbrough and Marton Sixth Form College in 1974. In April 1974, the school had been taken over by the County of Cleveland (Cleveland County Council).

Acklam Hall Grammar School had 600 boys in the mid-1960s. It merged with Kirby to form Acklam High School, a comprehensive school, in 1968. This school then further changed in 1974 to Acklam Sixth Form College and King's Manor 11–16 School. The King's Manor School suffered a fire and moved across the road, Hall Drive, to share a site with Hall Garth School (now Hall Garth Community Arts College).

=== Former colleges ===
Longlands College of Further Education was on Douglas Street which opened in 1957, and at first partly used by the Constantine Technical College. It was near the junction of Marton Road (A172) and Longlands Road (A1085) just west of North Ormesby.

Kirby College of Further Education was separate and established in 1968 on Roman Road. It had departments such as Food and Fashion, Catering, Hairdressing, and Business Studies, and taught single O-level subjects (re-takes or part-time). It also offered A level programmes in the late 1970s

=== Foundation through two mergers ===
Teesside Tertiary College was created on 1 August 1995 by the merger of Longlands College of Further Education and Marton Sixth Form College, and was based on Marton Road next to the James Cook University Hospital.

Middlesbrough College was formed when Kirby College of Further Education merged with Acklam Sixth Form College, also on 1 August 1995.

From 1992, these two colleges had been funded by the Further Education Funding Council for England. In 1995, Teesside Tertiary College offered £1,200 for every person signing up for A-level course who had eight A grades at GCSE.

=== Merger and move to new site ===
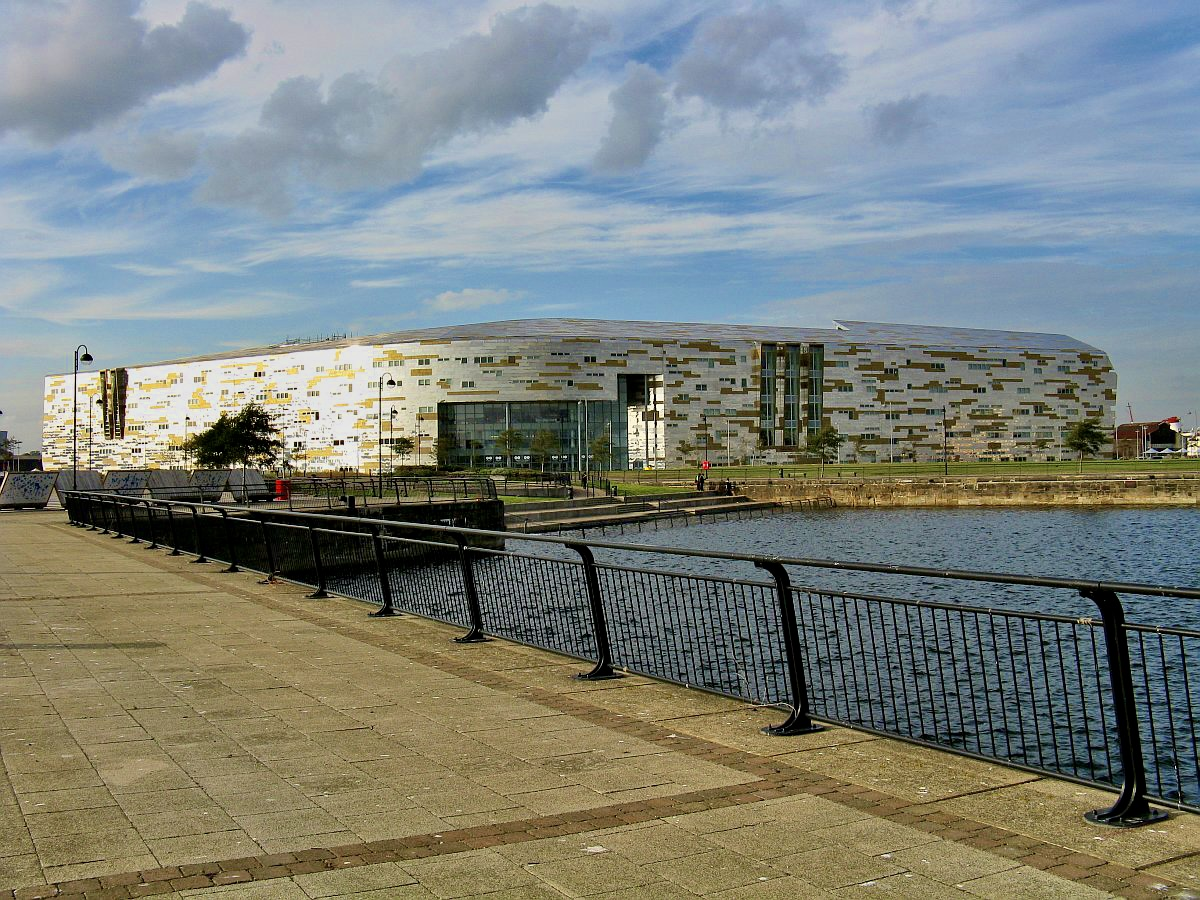
Main Building

Middlesbrough College merged with Teesside Tertiary College on 1 August 2002, with it now being spread over four sites. Since 2001, these colleges had been funded by the Learning and Skills Council for England. Once the merger was complete, planning began for the relocation to a single site at Middlehaven in central Middlesbrough. Building work for the new college building at Middlehaven began in early 2007. In September 2008, the four separate sites were eventually consolidated onto a single site with the opening of the new £68 million Middlesbrough college building. The Middlehaven site was officially opened on 12 February 2009 by Prince Andrew, Duke of York, although the plaque marking the opening was removed in January 2022.

The Middlehaven site has since grown with the opening of new college buildings adjacent to the main building. MC6 & MC SPORT (a sixth form centre & sports academy) opened in October 2012, and MC STEM (science, technology, engineering & maths) was officially opened by Professor Brian Cox in November 2015. In April 2022, MC Digital was opened, housing new labs for games development, video editing, computing, and other tech based pathways. Part of the MC STEM building is now the base for many of the Higher Education courses offered under University Centre Middlesbrough. The college has gone through further development in 2024 with TTE Technical Centre building being opened ready for courses starting in 2024/25, and a new, state-of-the-art healthcare ward being opened by Dr Ranj Singh in June.

=== Former sites ===
Middlesbrough college's four previous sites were:

- Marton Road (Marton Campus)
- Douglas Street (Longlands Campus)
- Roman Road (Kirby Campus)
- Hall Drive (Acklam Campus)

Most of the 18-acre (73,000 m^{2}) Marton Campus is in the process of becoming a housing estate with 275 houses being built by Taylor Woodrow. The remainder of the site was encompassed into part of the new Middlesbrough Sports Village with an outdoor velodrome replacing the football pitches.

The 9-acre (36,000 m^{2}) Kirby Campus now has 84 houses and 53 apartments built on it by Taylor Woodrow. The former Kirby Grammar School has become 21 apartments. The 9-acre (36,000 m^{2}) Longlands Campus has become 104 houses built by Taylor Woodrow. This includes the former playing field and sports hall.

== Curriculum ==
Courses range from university academics to vocational education. Selected higher education courses exist by virtue of an indirectly funded partnership arrangement with the Open University.

== Alumni ==
=== Acklam Hall Grammar School for Boys ===
- Roland Carl Backhouse, Professor of Computing, University of Nottingham
- Air Vice-Marshal Robert Hooks
- Adm Sir Michael Livesay, (first) Commander of HMS Invincible from 1979 to 1982
- Alan Old, England rugby union international from 1972 to 1978
- Chris Old, England cricket international from 1972 to 1981

=== Middlesbrough High School for Boys ===
- Robert Cant, Labour MP from 1966 to 1983 for Stoke-on-Trent Central
- George Elliott (footballer)
- Sir John Watson Gibson, civil engineer, worked with Pauling & Co. to build the Jebel Aulia Dam, and in the war designed the breakwaters for the Mulberry harbours
- Sir Denis Hamilton, Editor of The Sunday Times, Chairman from 1979 to 1985 of Reuters and President from 1981 to 1983 of the Commonwealth Press Union
- J. D. Mackie, historian and Professor of Scottish History and Literature from 1930 to 1957 at the University of Glasgow
- Sir Edward Pickering, editor from 1957 to 1962 of the Daily Express, and chairman from 1970 to 1974 of IPC Magazines
- Cyril Smith, Professor of Pianoforte from 1934 to 1974 at the Royal College of Music
- Bob Mortimer, Comedy Actor

=== Kirby Grammar School ===
- Anna Raeburn, agony aunt and radio broadcaster.
- Professor Sue Scott, Feminist and Sociologist, Managing Editor of Discover Society.

=== Middlesbrough College ===
- Eve Robson, Highland Games competitor

== See also ==
- The former Middlesbrough College of Education on Borough Road, a teacher-training college which became part of Teesside University (itself the former Constantine Technical College)
- Redcar & Cleveland College
- Cleveland College of Art and Design

== Gallery ==
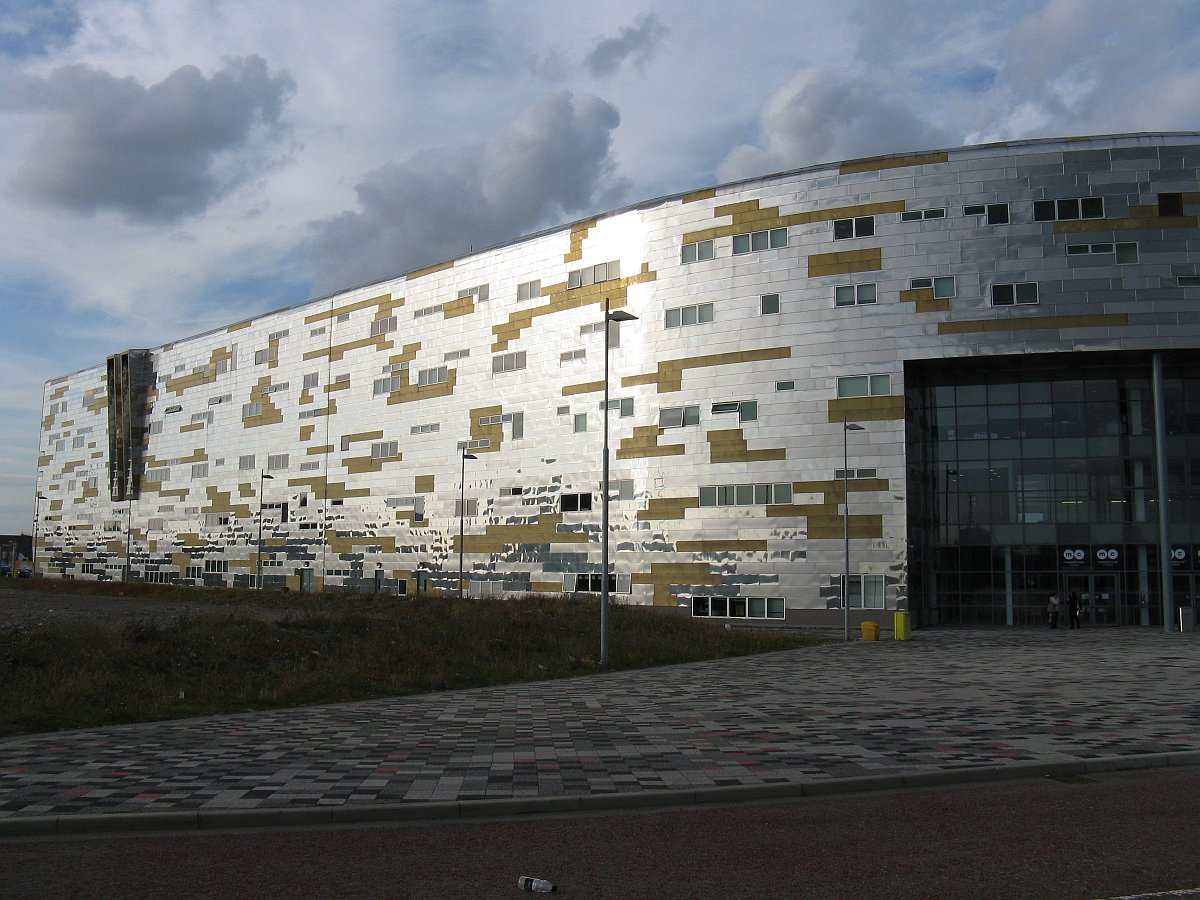
West wing

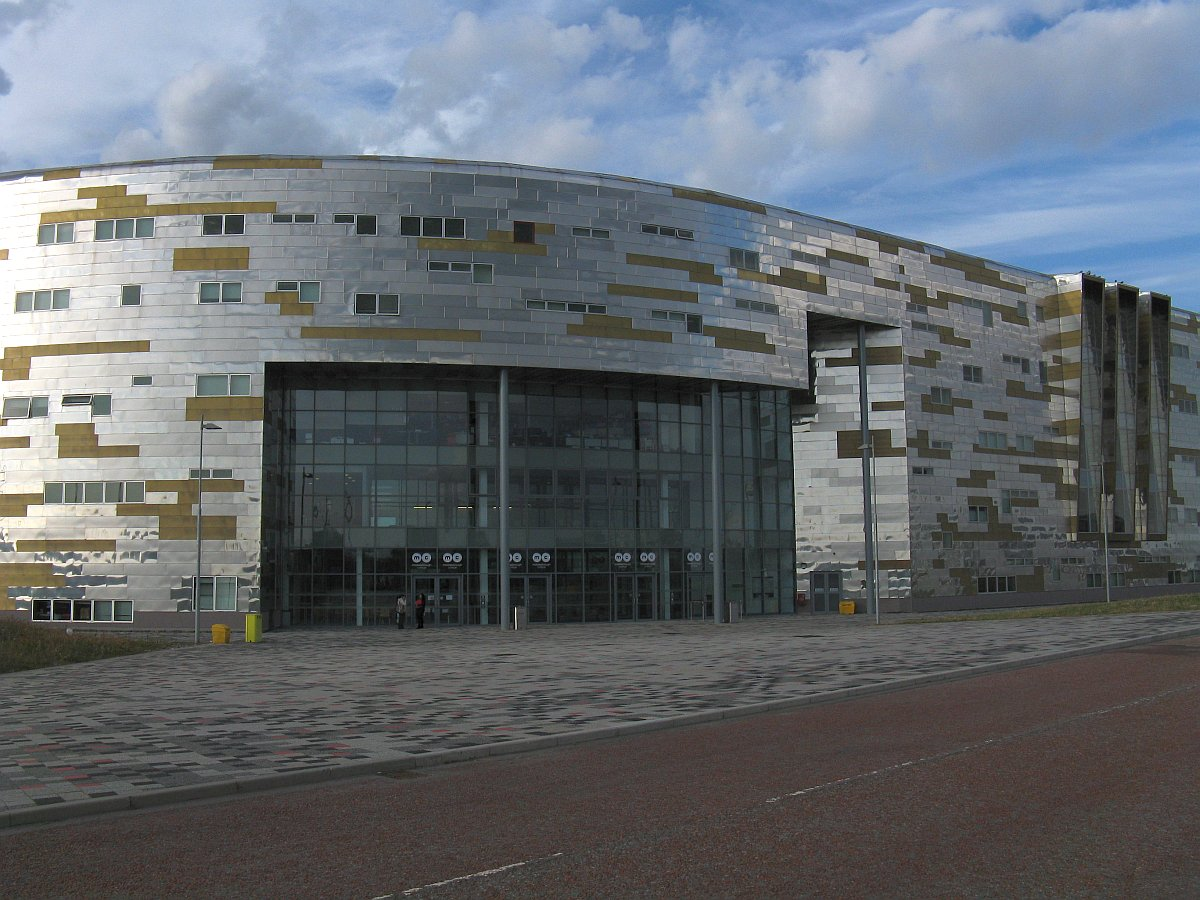
Main entrance

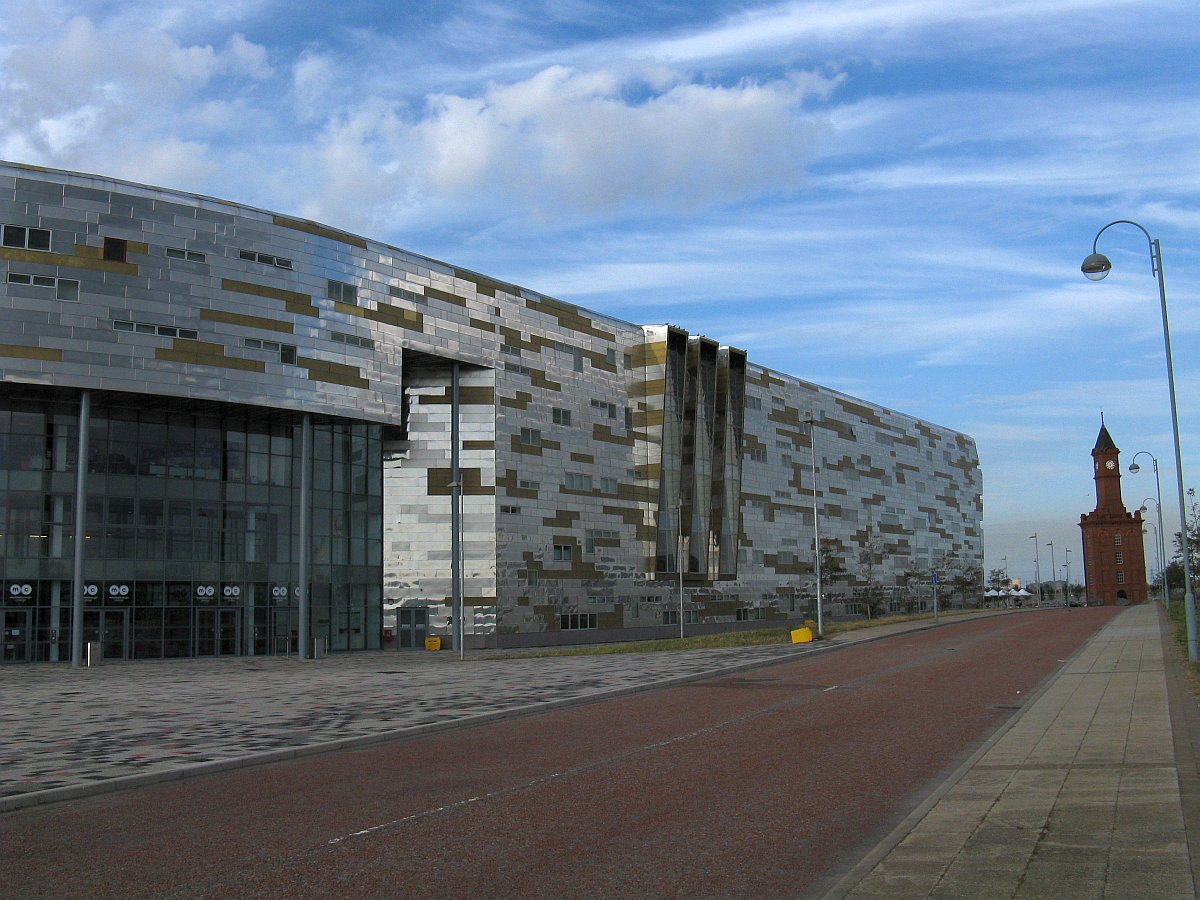
North wing.
