= John Watson Gibson =

British civil engineer

Sir John Watson Gibson OBE
- Born: 9 August 1885; Middlesbrough, Yorkshire
- Died: 19 March 1947 (aged 61); London, England
- Citizenship: United Kingdom
- Education: Middlesbrough School for Boys
- Spouse: Lilian
- Engineering career
- Projects: Queen Mary Reservoir; Sennar Dam; Jebel Aulia Dam
- Significant design: Phoenix breakwaters BISF house
- Significant advance: Phoenix breakwaters

Sir John Watson Gibson OBE (9 August 1885 – 19 March 1947) was an English civil engineer. He designed dams in England and in Anglo-Egyptian Sudan and port installations in England and Ireland. In the UK he is most notable for having designed a key part of the Mulberry harbours for the 1944 Normandy landings.

== Biography ==
=== Early life and career ===
Gibson was born at Linthorpe, Middlesbrough in 1885, son of Robert Elwin Gibson and Ruth Eleanor, née Hugill. His father was a clerk and accountant. He was educated at Middlesbrough School for Boys. He was apprenticed to S Pearson & Son, with whom he assisted in the building of new concrete jetties at the docks in Southampton, Fenit in Ireland for access to Tralee, and the new King George Dock in Kingston upon Hull.

=== First World War ===
Having what was designated an essential skill, Gibson was refused permission to serve in combat with the British Army. The Army lent him to the Ministry of Munitions, for whom in 1916 he went to the United States as Director General of shell and gun supply. He returned to the UK in 1917 and became controller of Aircraft Requirements and Review. For his services to his country Gibson was appointed an Officer of the British Empire (OBE) in 1918.

=== 1918–1939 ===
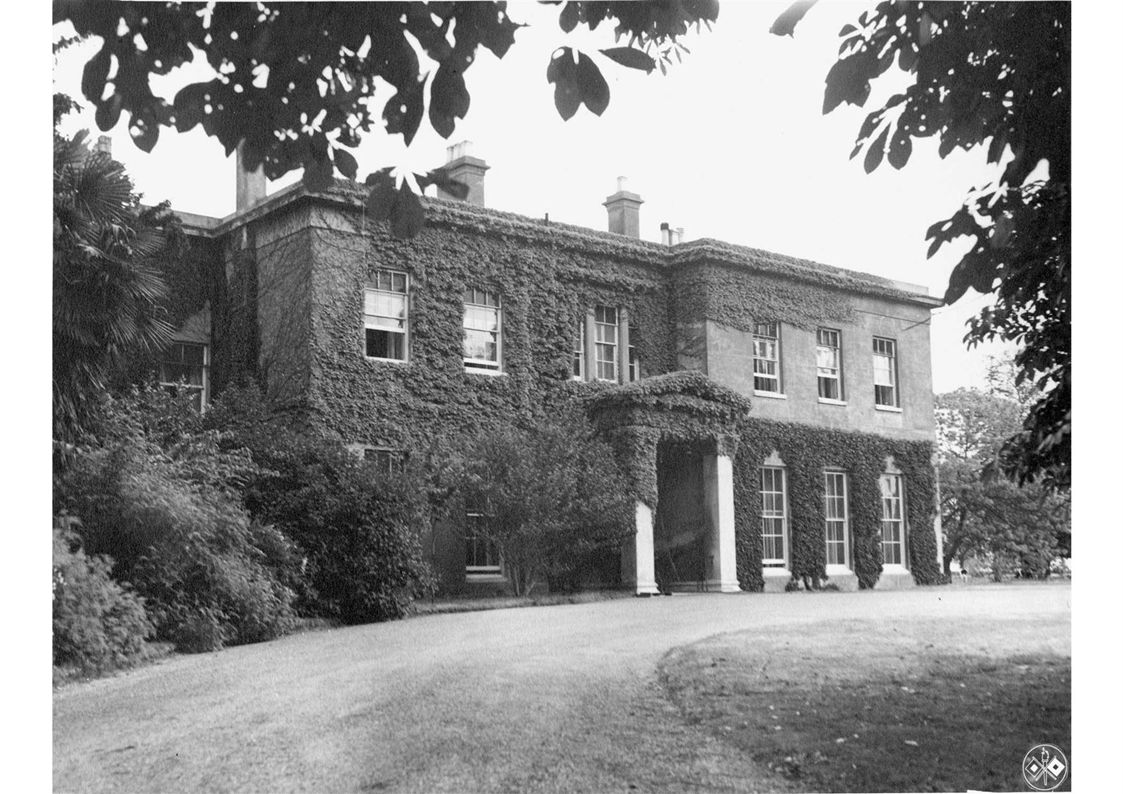
Stanwell Place, Gibson's home in Middlesex

After the war Gibson specialised in reservoirs and water supply. In the 1920s he designed the Queen Mary Reservoir at Stanwell, Middlesex, which when completed in 1925 the largest water storage reservoir in the World. While working there he bought Stanwell Place, which came with 90 acres (36 ha) of land, and the adjoining Stanhope and Hammonds farms, which between them totalled 261 acres (106 ha).

Gibson's estate totalled 346 acres (140 ha) when in 1936 the Metropolitan Water Board bought most of it to build the King George VI Reservoir.

Gibson was Pearson's site agent for the Sennar Dam in Sudan. In 1933 he entered into partnership with Pauling & Co., forming Gibson and Pauling (Foreign) Ltd in 1933 to build the Jebel Aulia Dam on the White Nile, also in Sudan, which was the largest dam in the world at that time. After completing the Jebel Aulia Dam, Gibson became managing director of Pauling & Co, a position he held until his death in March 1947.

=== Second World War ===
At the outbreak of the Second World War, Gibson offered his services as an engineer to his country. For the duration of the war his family moved to a more rural location, and Gibson lent Stanwell Place to the United States Army High Command. It was used for two high level meetings of the Supreme Allied Command of General Dwight D. Eisenhower held in late June and mid-July 1944, with attendees including Henry Stimson, George Marshall, and Admiral Ernest King.

After the agreement to proceed with a design for the Mulberry harbours for the 1944 Normandy landings, Gibson created the detailed design for the Phoenix breakwaters. Under the direction of Major General Sir Harold Augustus Wernher, Gibson oversaw the fabrication of the Concrete Phoenix Caissons across Southern England and created the special 'Winterization' process to safeguard the breakwaters during the winter of 1944.

=== Post-war career ===
After the war Gibson decided due to his age to change his professional focus, designing in collaboration with the British Iron and Steel Federation, two prototype steel framed prefab houses to house families made homeless by enemy action. Eventually more than 30,000 BISF houses were built.

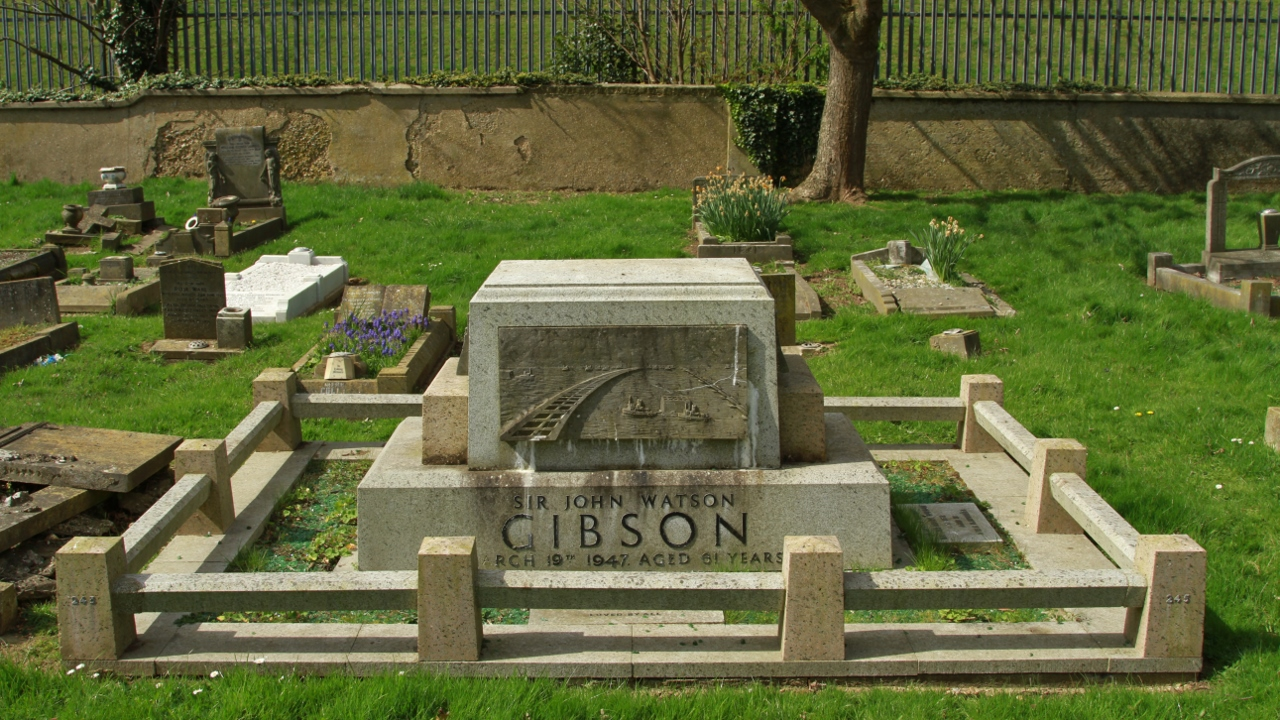
Grave of Sir John Watson Gibson and Lady Lilian Gibson

== Personal life ==
In 1911, Gibson married Lilian Gindle Armstrong, daughter of John Armstrong, of Linthorpe, Middlesbrough. They had two sons and three daughters.

=== Death and burial ===
Gibson died aged 61 in 1947 and is buried in Stanwell Burial Ground. In 1948 his estate sold Stanwell Place with its residual 22 acres (9 ha) to King Faisal II of Iraq. In 1956 Faisal II still owned Stanwell Place and Gibson's sons still owned the residual 17 acres (7 ha) of Stanhope farm.

Gibson's widow Lady Lilian died in 1962 and is buried with him.

=== Legacy ===
In 2015, the Happy Landing pub in Clare Road, Stanwell was renamed the "Sir John Gibson".

== Sources ==
- Reynolds, Susan, ed. (1962). A History of the County of Middlesex. Victoria County History. Vol. III. London: Oxford University Press for the Institute of Historical Research. pp. 36–41.
