= Anna Raeburn =

British journalist

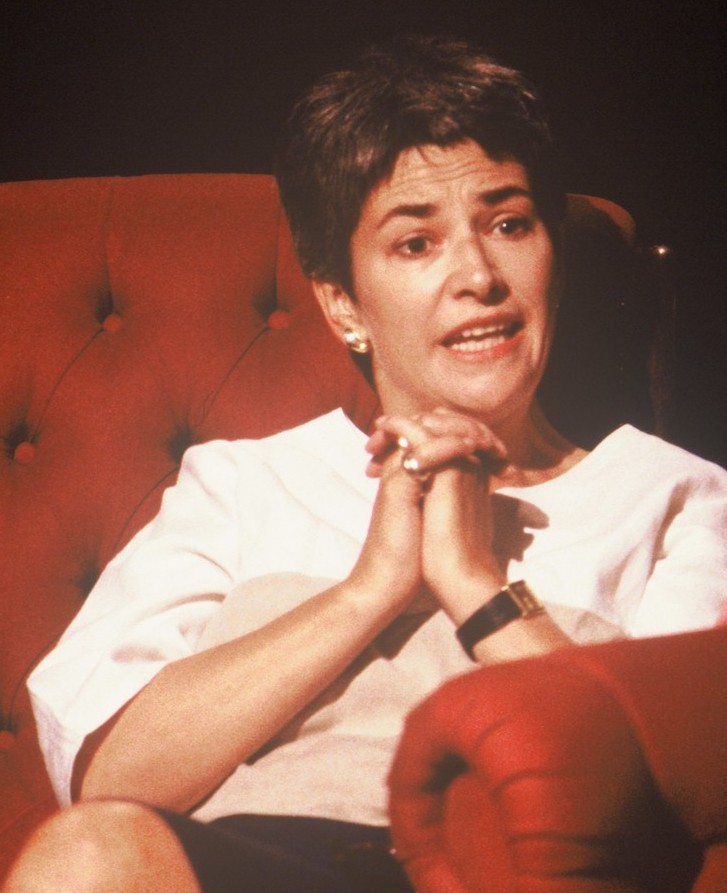
- Anna Raeburn appearing on Channel 4 programme After Dark in 1989
- Born: 3 April 1944 (age 82); Middlesbrough, England
- Occupations: Broadcaster, journalist and author
- Children: 1.
- Website: annaraeburn.com

Anna Raeburn (born 3 April 1944) is a British broadcaster and author who is best known for her role as a radio agony aunt, giving advice on relationships and more general life problems. As a broadcaster, she has worked for Capital Radio, LBC and the original Talk Radio. She has authored two books and currently writes her own weekly blog called "Annalog".

== Early life ==
Raeburn went to the all-girls Kirby Grammar School in Linthorpe, Middlesbrough, north Yorkshire. She moved to London aged 17 and at 19 was working in New York. She worked for Penthouse, Forum and Cosmopolitan.

== Radio ==
Raeburn built her reputation in the 1970s and 1980s on a popular late night problem phone-in show on Capital Radio, called Anna And The Doc. The journalist Vincent Graff said of the show: “If you were a baffled teenager trying to find your way in the world, Anna and the Doc gave you the roadmap.” Her celebrity status was such that in 1978 she was invited onto BBC Radio 4's Desert Island Discs choosing as her favourite track, "Amazing Grace" by Aretha Franklin. She also had an afternoon advice show on Talk Radio in the late 1990s.

In the early 1990s, Raeburn presented an afternoon show on LBC Crown FM. In 2006, she returned to the station's current incarnation – LBC 97.3 – in the same slot. The show primarily featured listeners ringing in with everyday problems to which Raeburn, often with the assistance of a profes

From January 2007, as part of new year changes, Raeburn's show moved an hour later to 2–4pm as a new lifestyle, health and well-being show, presented by Jim Davis preceding her.

Raeburn presented her last show on LBC 97.3 on 3 August 2007. She had been expected to return in September, but the station announced that her afternoon slot would be rested. Her slot was reallocated, to Jeni Barnett who was later replaced herself.

In February 2021, Raeburn returned to radio, with a Sunday evening programme on Boom Radio. She left the station shortly after.

== Television ==
She co-wrote the television series Agony, starring Maureen Lipman. Raeburn was a critic on the ITV1 daytime show Mum's on Strike in 2005. Other TV appearances included spots as an agony aunt in the early days of GMTV from 1993, a guest on late-night discussion programme After Dark, and as a panellist on comedy game show Blankety Blank. She was an occasional panellist, in the late 1980s, on the panel show Through the Keyhole.

== Personal life ==
Raeburn's book published in 1984, Talking To Myself, was largely based on her broadcasting career. Her mother died in 1988, her parents were married for 48 years.

Her first marriage was to Michael Raeburn in 1977 After her divorce, she married Nigel Lilley in 1981, with whom she had a son, Taylor who was born in 1980. She divorced Lilley after 20 years. She is a grandmother to her son's daughter.

In October 2020, Raeburn said that she had the eye condition macular degeneration, and was receiving treatment at Moorfields Eye Hospital.
