= Mum's on Strike =

- Genre: Lifestyle
- Starring: Anna Raeburn
- Narrated by: Rory McGrath
- Country of origin: United Kingdom
- No. of series: 2
- No. of episodes: 55

Production
- Running time: 45 minutes (inc. adverts)
- Production company: Lion Television

Original release
- Network: ITV
- Release: 11 April 2005 – 23 June 2006

Related
- ITV Day

Mum's on Strike is a British lifestyle programme that aired on ITV from 11 April 2005 to 23 June 2006. It was narrated by Rory McGrath and featured Anna Raeburn as the "parenting expert."

== Format ==
Each programme features two families. The mother of the house heads off in a limo for a weekend of pampering, leaving the father in charge. The mum will remove the one item from the house she reckons stops him pulling his weight in the first place, such as the Sky remote or a bag of PE kit. Day one typically involves feeding the children and organising the school run, doing housework and helping with housework.

On day two, typically a Saturday, the dad has to face a task their partner reckons he's always avoided in the past. It might be taking all three youngsters shopping for school shoes, or preparing a picnic and taking them out for an activity day. On top of that, they generally have to fit in all the housework, as well as laundry and a food shop.

Meanwhile, back at the health spa, the mums are able to watch film of their partners' efforts. After the two days are up, the mums go back home to their partners and children. At the end of the episode, one dad is presented with an award for "Most Improved Dad".

== Transmissions ==
| Series | Start date | End date | Episodes |
|---|---|---|---|
| 1 | 11 April 2005 | 20 May 2005 | 25 |
| 2 | 8 May 2006 | 23 June 2006 | 30 |
