= Carol Smillie =

Scottish television presenter

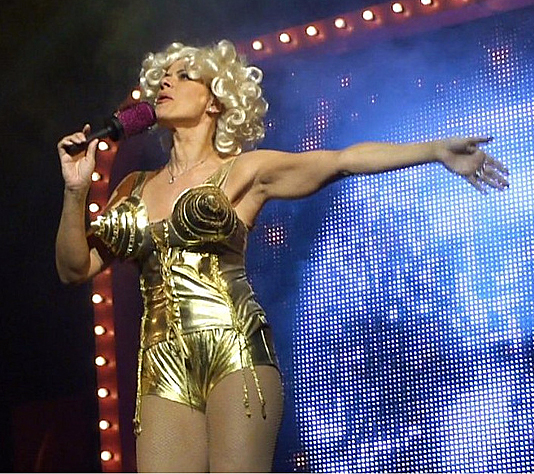
- Smillie performing as Madonna in Hormonal Housewives at the King's Theatre, Glasgow, November 2011
- Born: Carol Patricia Smillie; 23 December 1961 (age 64); Glasgow, Scotland, United Kingdom
- Occupations: Television presenter, actress, entrepreneur, author, model, humanist celebrant
- Years active: 1989–2014
- Spouse: Alex Knight (m. 1991)
- Children: 3
- Website: www.carolsmillie.tv

Carol Patricia Smillie (born 23 December 1961) is a Scottish former television presenter, actress and model from Glasgow. Smillie became famous as a television presenter during the 1990s and early 2000s. She was best known for assisting Nicky Campbell on the UK version of the game show Wheel of Fortune between 1989 and 1994. Between 1996 and 2003, she was the main presenter on the BBC One home makeover show Changing Rooms.

After leaving the Glasgow School of Art, Smillie was a model throughout the 1980s. Her break in television came in 1989 when she auditioned for the role of hostess on Wheel of Fortune. After leaving the show in 1994, Smillie appeared on the BBC television channel, firstly as a reporter on The Travel Show, and then the Holiday show, eventually becoming the programme's main presenter. The DIY programme Changing Rooms established her name and led to her presenting other primetime shows for the BBC, such as the National Lottery and her own morning chat show Smillie's People.

In 2012 Smillie decided to leave mainstream TV and created a new business venture, launching a brand of leak-proof underwear for women, named DiaryDoll. This was later changed to Pretty Clever Pants. In 2018 Smillie relinquished control of her business, licensing the brand to the company High Street TV.

As of 2018 Smillie is pursuing a career conducting humanist ceremonies, having qualified as a humanist celebrant with the Humanist Society Scotland.

== 1961–1988: Early life and career beginnings ==
Smillie was born on 23 December 1961 in Glasgow, the daughter of Isobel and electrical engineer George Smillie. She has two older sisters and one older brother.

Smillie attended Simshill Primary School and the independent Hutchesons' Grammar School. She attained seven O-grades, including a qualification in fabric and fashion. She left the following year with three Highers. Five were required to be admitted into the Glasgow School of Art. Smillie ultimately obtained one each from Langside College and Cardonald College, thus completing the entry requirements.

At age 18, in 1979, Smillie embarked on her first year at the Glasgow School of Art, studying art, Design, and Fashion, with the idea of becoming a fashion designer, but felt she didn't really fit in with the typical punk students sporting green hair and pink shoes. To subsidise her studies, Smillie worked in a cocktail bar, modelling part-time, and eventually left to embark on a modelling career.

Smillie then joined the Best Modelling Agency, run by Fiona Best. Too short at 5 ft 5 in (1.65 m) for catwalk modelling, she booked photo shoots and promotions. Smillie worked for the agency throughout the 1980s. Smillie met her future husband, former model Alex Knight, through Fiona's agency.

== Life and career ==
=== 1989–2011, 2013, 2022: Television career ===
==== 1989–1994: Wheel of Fortune ====
Smillie's presenting career launched in 1989, at age 27, when she beat 5,000 other applicants to become the hostess and puzzle board operator of Scottish Television's Wheel of Fortune game show. She co-presented the show until 1994 with Nicky Campbell.

==== 1994–1996: Get It On ====
Fashion series presented by Smillie and produced by Scottish Television.

==== 1992–1993: The Travel Show ====
Reporter on BBC Two's The Travel Show.

==== 1995–1996: Hearts of Gold ====
Smillie joined the show as co-presenter with Mickey Hutton, alongside the main presenter Esther Rantzen. The show recognised unsung heroes and heroines who had shown outstanding bravery and dedication to public life.

==== 1996–2000: Holiday ====
Stints followed on BBC One for the Holiday programme. Smillie continued to present holiday programmes such as Summer Holiday, Holiday Swaps, Holiday Heaven and Holiday Favourites throughout the 1990s.

==== 1996–2003: Changing Rooms ====
In 1996, Smillie became the original presenter of BBC Two's new DIY show Changing Rooms. The show was an immediate success and was transferred to BBC One for series 2. The programme is credited with starting a craze for DIY in the late 1990s. During her time on the show, it won a National TV Award and an INDIE Award and were BAFTA nominated. Smillie remained the main presenter for 13 series, leaving in 2003. In September 1998, she was the subject of This Is Your Life.

==== 1996–2000: The National Lottery Show ====
In 1996, Smillie was selected as a presenter of the BBC The National Lottery Show. She mainly appeared on the Wednesday Midweek Draw show, but also made occasional appearances on Saturday nights. Smillie presented various incarnations of the show between 1996 and 2000. In September 2006, she appeared on The National Lottery: Everyone's A Winner! in Edinburgh.

==== 1996–1997: Smillie's People ====
In 1998, Smillie hosted a short mid-morning celebrity chat-show on BBC One entitled Smillie's People.

==== 2003–2005: Dream Holiday Homes ====
In 2003, after leaving Changing Rooms, Smillie joined the Channel 5 show Dream Holiday Homes. This new show was similar to Changing Rooms, although this time, entire properties were given a makeover. The properties were situated in various Southern European locations, and at the end of each show Smillie would sell off the property for the price of a £1 phone call to a lucky viewer picked at random. The show ran for five series.

==== 2004: Strictly Ice Dancing ====
In 2004, Smillie was one of the celebrities to take part in Strictly Ice Dancing, a one-off ice dance version of Strictly Come Dancing.

==== 2005: The People's Court ====
Smillie was back working for STV Productions in 2005 as presenter of the short-lived ITV show The People's Court.

==== 2005: A Brush with Fame ====
Later that year, she was the presenter of ITV's A Brush with Fame, searching for the UK's best amateur portrait artist.

==== 2006: Strictly Come Dancing ====
From October to December 2006, Smillie took part in Series Four of Strictly Come Dancing with dance partner Matthew Cutler. She improved as the series progressed. Len Goodman often referred to her as the Dark Horse of the competition, and played music from the Black Beauty TV series over her training clips on the complementary show Strictly Come Dancing: It Takes Two. She came fifth out of the fourteen competitors.

Performance scores
Week	Dance/Song	Judges' score					Result
Week	Dance/Song	Hoorwood	Phillips	Goodman	Tonioli	Total	Result
1	Female Group Dance	-	-	-	-	-	Safe
2	Quickstep/9 to 5	7	5	6	7	25	Safe
3	Jive/Hanky Panky	6	7	7	7	27	Safe
4	Foxtrot/Stuck on You	6	7	8	8	29	Safe
5	Salsa/Don't Stop 'Til You Get Enough	7	6	8	8	29	Safe
6	American Smooth/It's Oh So Quiet	6	7	7	7	27	Safe
7	Cha Cha Cha/Dancing in the Moonlight	7	7	8	8	30	Safe
8	Waltz/If You Don't Know Me by Now	7	7	8	8	30	Bottom 2
9	Viennese Waltz/Breakaway; Samba/Club Tropicana	8; 7	8; 9	9; 9	9; 9	34; 34	Eliminated

==== 2007–2008: Postcode Challenge ====
Smillie returned to STV from November 2007 into 2008 to host the Scottish channel's new gameshow, Postcode Challenge. In each show, four teams of six people from the same postcode area are tested on general knowledge.

==== 2009: Best of British Wedding Venues ====
On 22 September 2009, Smillie presented a 10 part series entitled Best of British Wedding Venues on Wedding TV, a woman's lifestyle channel on the Sky and Freesat platforms.

==== 2013–2014: Finding Scotland's Real Heroes ====
Smillie presented the 2013 and 2014 series of STV's Finding Scotland's Real Heroes.

==== Television guest appearances ====
In 1993, she appeared on the Saturday evening BBC One light entertainment show Noel's House Party, when her "Gotcha" tape was shown to viewers.

In 2001, Smillie appeared on Lily Savage's Blankety Blank and the following year appeared on The Sooty Show in the episode called "All New Sooty".

In the summer of 2009, Smillie appeared as a guest presenter of STV's The Hour for one week, with main anchor Stephen Jardine.

In 2004, she took part in a television documentary called Gender Swap for Channel 5. Using silicon prosthetic makeup, she was transformed from female to male and was then given the challenge of attending a speed dating event as her new opposite sex self.

=== Outside television ===
==== 1982–2010: Model ====
In her early years, Smillie worked the exhibition circuit and was an occasional lingerie model. Smillie was allegedly one of the Tennent's Lager girls (a Scottish marketing promotion that put pictures of young women on the backs of cans of lager). Smillie denied having had this role in The Independent newspaper on 2 October 2006.

Smillie has continued to model occasionally since her rise to fame. Between 2007 and 2010 Smillie was the figurehead model for the Scottish company The Edinburgh Woollen Mill.

==== 1994 and 2009: Radio ====
In 1994, Smillie presented a holiday show for BBC Radio 5 Live called Carol Smillie's Blue Skies, featuring reports from various worldwide destinations and holiday tips for would be travellers.

In June 2009, Smillie appeared in the BBC Radio Scotland comedy sketch show Ellis and Clarke. Smillie appeared in a number of sketches in the 30-minute production playing herself, in which she and the members of the cast parodied her television personality. The show was broadcast on BBC Radio Scotland on 5 June 2009.

On Bank Holiday 31 August 2009, Smillie hosted her own Radio show on 105.2 Smooth Radio, a Scottish Independent Local Radio station broadcasting to Glasgow and the surrounding area.

==== 2003: Author ====
In 2003, Smillie joined forces with Eileen Fursland to become a best selling author with the publication of Carol Smillie's Working Mum's Handbook. The book examined the practical problems and emotional issues that face women who go back to work. It considered work-life balance, time management, workplace rights to maternity leave and pay, tax credits.

Starting on 10 May 2008, Smillie co-wrote – with animal behaviourist Emma Magson – a weekly column in The Times entitled 'Perfect Pets'. The column was featured in the Body and Soul section of the Saturday edition and lasted 10 weeks.

==== 2006–2011: Actress ====
===== 2006–2007 and 2010–2011: Stage actress =====
In February 2006, Smillie made her début on the stage in the Eve Ensler play The Vagina Monologues. She completed three tours of Scotland, appearing in Aberdeen, Ayr, Dundee, Edinburgh, Glasgow and Perth.

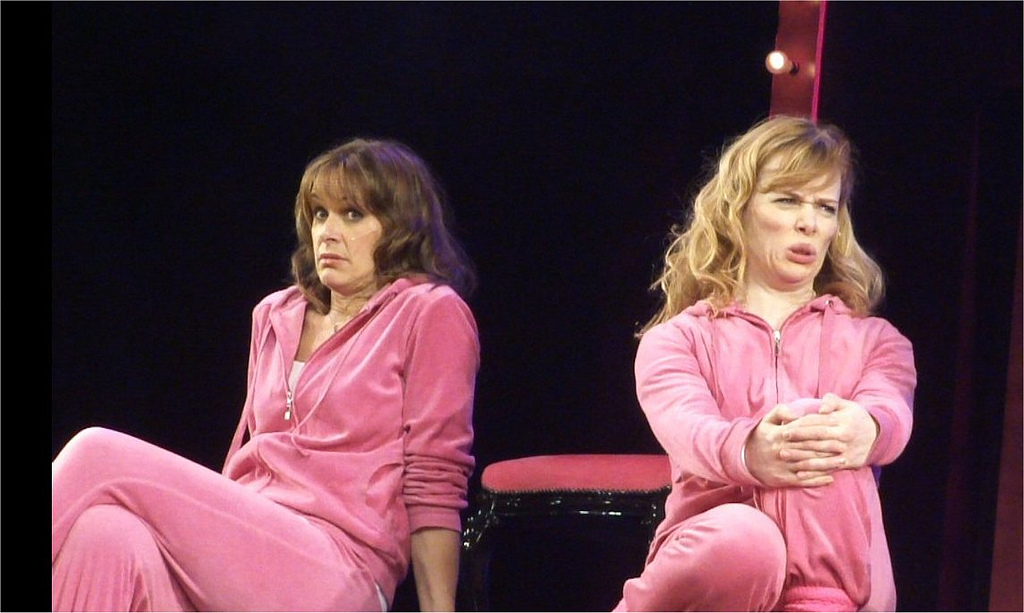
Smillie performing with Shonagh Price in Hormonal Housewives, 2010

In February to March 2010, Smillie appeared on stage in Hormonal Housewives, a new comedy written by Julie Coombe and John MacIsaac. Appearing alongside Smillie were the co-writer Julie Coombe and Shonagh Price. The comedy portrayed three women juggling a career, childcare and being a housewife. The play begins with the three women getting ready for a night out and then moves into a series of self-contained sketches. The finale features a medley of music by Kylie Minogue, Madonna and Cher. Smillie takes the part of Madonna, dancing and miming to the track "Holiday", dressed in a pastiche outfit based on the Jean Paul Gaultier-designed conical bra corset, from the singer's 1990 Blond Ambition tour. Smillie took the play on a three-week tour of Scotland performing at theatres in Aberdeen, Dundee, Edinburgh, Glasgow and Inverness.

===== 2008: Film Actress =====
In 2008, Smillie made her film debut in a short film entitled Infamy playing a television presenter named Joan. The story concerns a man who is so desperate to get on Reality TV that he will try anything, including ultimately, holding up a shop at gunpoint to make the local news.

==== 2012–2018: Entrepreneur ====
===== 2012–2018: DiaryDoll/Pretty Clever Pants =====
In October 2012, Smillie started her own business, DiaryDoll, with business partner and friend Annabel Croft, an ex-international tennis player. Together they created a range of women's underwear specifically for use during periods, with a secret waterproof panel inside them to remove the possibility of leaks and stains on clothing and bedding. They were designed to look and feel like normal underwear – i.e. breathable, washable and not crackly – giving women the confidence to go about their usual activities. In 2014 DiaryDoll partnered with charity Endometriosis UK.

==== 2018–present: Humanist celebrant ====
Smillie is a humanist. In 2018 she became an accredited humanist celebrant with the Humanist Society Scotland, and began to conduct humanist ceremonies.

== Personal life ==
Smillie lives in Glasgow with husband Alex Knight, a restaurateur, whom she married in August 1991. They have three children.

Smillie's smile was caricatured by the impressionist Ronni Ancona in the UK television show Big Impression. Ancona's impression of Smillie used the catchphrase "I'm Smiley Smiley Carol Smillie".

== Charity work ==
Smillie is involved with several charities, primarily ones concerned with child welfare. One of her main charities is The Prince & Princess of Wales Hospice (PPWH). She hosts 'A Little Less Strictly Come Dancing' Ball for them every year alongside Angus Purden. Smillie was a contestant on the British television game show Who Wants to Be a Millionaire? supporting the charity NSPCC. She appeared on the show with Michael Aspel. They failed to progress past the £16,000 mark when they missed the question about authors, dropping to £1,000.

=== Trustee ===
Smillie is trustee to a number of Glasgow institutions. These include Kelvingrove Art Gallery and Museum, where she is on the board as trustee of The Kelvingrove Refurbishment Appeal (KRA). This is an independent trust established to raise £5 million in sponsorship and donations towards the £27.9million refurbishment of Kelvingrove. She became a board member and Trustee for The Riverside Museum.

She supports the Glasgow School of Art, as a former and current student of the School's Continuing Education Programme. Smillie is a member of the Mackintosh Conservation and Access Project team. In July 2007 she launched The Digital MacIntosh Project to raise funds for the restoration and refurbishment of the MacIntosh Building, which houses the school.

== Mensa ==
When Smillie was hosting Wheel of Fortune in the early 1990s, she was invited to take the Mensa test for high IQs by a tabloid newspaper, to prove that game show hostesses were not stupid. She said she had passed with an IQ of 148. She courted controversy in 2003, when she announced in an interview that she had cheated on the test. She admitted that the test was not taken under exam conditions, and she completed only two thirds of it, coming unstuck at the end. Smillie had phoned a friend to complete the remainder of the test. She said, "I felt slightly guilty at the time, but it hadn't really bothered me that I had cheated because it was never a real test to me, and Mensa had never invited me to take part."

== Filmography ==
=== Television ===
Presenter

- Wheel of Fortune 1989–1994
- The Travel Show 1992
- Holiday 1994–2001

including Summer Holiday, Holiday Swaps, Holiday Heaven and Holiday Favourites

- Hearts of Gold 1995 – 1996
- Get It On 1996
- Changing Rooms 1996–2003
- The National Lottery 1996–2000

including The National Lottery – Amazing Luck Stories, The National Lottery – We've Got Your Number, National Lottery – Local Heroes

- Smillie's People 1996–97
- Crazy For Love 1996
- Edinburgh Hogmanay Live 1996
- Edinburgh Hogmanay Live 1997
- New Year Live Hogmanay Show 1998
- Star Secrets 1999
- Surprising Stars 2001
- Dream Holiday Homes 2003–2005
- Baby Hospital Live 2004
- The Peoples Court 2005
- A Brush With Fame 2005
- Yorkhill 2005–2006 (Narrator)
- Postcode Challenge 2007–2008
- The Hour 2009
- Best of British Wedding Venues 2009
- Scotland's Winter Wonderland 2010 (Narrator)
- 3@Three 2010
- The Hour 2010
- Vet School 2011 (Narrator)

Guest appearances

- The Hypnotic World of Paul McKenna 1994
- You Bet 1995 1996 1997
- The Alphabet Game 1996
- Shooting Stars 1996
- An Evening with Lily Savage 1996
- Confessions 1998
- Clive Anderson All Talk 1998
- McCoist & MacAulay 1998
- Celebrity Ready Steady Cook 1999
- All Over The Shop 1999
- It's Only TV...But I Like It 1999
- Blankety Blank 1999
- Clarkson 1999
- This Is Your Life 1999
- Heaven And Earth Show 2001
- Celebrity Friends Like These 2001
- Sooty 2001
- Hot Potatoes 2002
- Friday Night with Jonathon Ross 2002
- The Brian Conley Show 2002
- Alter Ego 2002
- Kelly 2003 and 2005
- V Graham Norton 2003
- Have I Got News for You 2003
- Today with Des and Mel 2003 2004
- Ant & Dec's Saturday Night Takeaway 2004
- Win, Lose or Draw Late 2004
- 29 Minutes of Fame 2005
- The Paul O'Grady Show 2005
- Stars in Fast Cars 2005
- Brainiac: Science Abuse 2005
- The Prince's Trust 30th Birthday: Live 2006
- Strictly Come Dancing: It Takes Two 2006
- Your Country Needs You 2007
- The Aphrodisiac Test 2007
- The Meaning Of Life 2007
- Tonight With Trevor McDonald 2007
- The Pyramid Game 2007
- The Grumpy Guide To 2007
- Hider in the House 2008
- The Alan Titchmarsh Show 2008
- Take It Or Leave It 2008
- How TV Changed Britain – Property 2008
- Daily Cooks Challenge 2008
- What Are You Like ? 2008
- STV's Top 30 Best Loved Shows (Part 5) 2009
- Loose Women 2009
- All Star Mr & Mrs 2010
- The One Show (Children in Need Reporter) 2010
- Coronation Street:The Big 50 2010
- Countdown 2011
- Pointless Celebrities 2013
- Pointless Celebrities 2019
- Richard Osman's House of Games 2022

Reality TV Appearances

- Gender Swap 2004
- Strictly Ice Dancing 2004
- Star Spell 2005
- Strictly Come Dancing 2006
- Strictly Come Dancing: It Takes Two 2006
- Kitchen Burnout 2010

Actress

- 2point4 Children 1999
- Brookside 2000
- Infamy 2008

Radio

- Ellis and Clarke 2009

=== Videos ===
- Changing Shape with Carol Smillie (2000)
- Changing Rooms – Trust Me..I'm A Designer (2002)

=== Books ===
- Carol Smillie's Working Mums Handbook (2003)

== Awards ==
- National Television Award for Changing Rooms
- INDIE Award for Changing Rooms
- Bafta Nominated for Changing Rooms
- Rear of the Year 1998, a British award for people with a notable posterior.
- In October 2008, Carol was nominated for a Scottish BAFTA, in The Lloyds TSB Scotland Audience Award for Most Popular Scottish Presenter category.
