= Mazowe Dam =

- Location of Mazowe Dam
- Country: Zimbabwe
- Location: Harare, Zimbabwe
- Coordinates: 17°31′18″S 30°59′19″E
- Purpose: Irrigation
- Status: Open
- Opening date: 1920

The Mazowe Dam (or Mazoe Dam) is a dam on the Mazowe River in Zimbabwe, in the Iron Mask Hills about 35 kilometres (22 mi) north of Harare. Constructed in 1920, it was built mainly to provide irrigation for the Mazoe citrus estates. The dam was also home to the Hunyani Rowing Club and formerly provided facilities for St. Georges, Prince Edward, Arundel and other rowing clubs. It is the only major dam on the Mazowe River.

The concrete dam was built by the British civil contractor Pauling & Co. and was raised by 3 metres (9.8 ft) in 1961 by drilling into the foundation rock and installing post-tensioned tendons into the concrete. It is 37 metres (121 ft) high and 163 metres (535 ft) long, with overflow spillways on either side. It can hold 35 million cubic meters of water and has a surface area of 445 hectares when full. Prolonged drought in the first two decades of the 21st century has left the dam virtually empty, badly damaging local agricultural production. It had previously almost dried up in the droughts of 1984-85 and again in 1996, but even after the breaking of the most recent drought the dam has remained empty.
