= Bill Thomas (cricketer) =

English cricketer and educator

Personal information
- Full name: William Owen Thomas
- Born: 27 April 1921; Linthorpe, Yorkshire, England
- Died: 8 August 2000 (aged 79); Sheringham, Norfolk, England
- Batting: Left-handed
- Bowling: Slow left-arm orthodox
- Relatives: Quorn Handley (son-in-law)

Domestic team information
- Years: Team
- 1948: Cambridge University
- 1952–1959: Norfolk
- 1954: Marylebone Cricket Club

Career statistics
| Competition | First-class |
|---|---|
| Matches | 4 |
| Runs scored | 44 |
| Batting average | 44.00 |
| 100s/50s | –/– |
| Top score | 19* |
| Balls bowled | 396 |
| Wickets | 3 |
| Bowling average | 48.33 |
| 5 wickets in innings | – |
| 10 wickets in match | – |
| Best bowling | 1/10 |
| Catches/stumpings | 2/– |
- Source: Cricinfo, 14 July 2019

William 'Bill' Owen Thomas (27 April 1921 – 8 August 2000) was an English first-class cricketer and schoolmaster.

Thomas was born at Middlesbrough in April 1921. He was educated at Dulwich College, before serving in the Second World War, being commissioned into the Green Howards as a second lieutenant in March 1941. Following the war, he went up to the University of Cambridge. While studying at Cambridge, he made his debut in first-class cricket for Cambridge University against the Free Foresters at Fenner's in 1948. He made two further first-class appearances for Cambridge, both in 1948, against Hampshire and Sussex. He took 3 wickets for Cambridge with his slow left-arm orthodox bowling. After graduating from Cambridge he became a schoolteacher. While teaching at Gresham's School, he played minor counties cricket for Norfolk from 1952–59, making 62 appearances in the Minor Counties Championship. He made a final first-class appearance for the Marylebone Cricket Club against Cambridge University at Lord's in 1954. He died in August 2000 at Sheringham, Norfolk. His son-in-law, Quorn Handley, played List A one-day cricket.
