= A Brush with Fame =

- Genre: Lifestyle Game show
- Presented by: Carol Smillie
- Country of origin: United Kingdom
- Original language: English
- No. of series: 1
- No. of episodes: 20

Production
- Running time: 45 minutes (inc. adverts)
- Production company: Granada

Original release
- Network: ITV
- Release: 10 October – 4 November 2005

Related
- ITV Day

A Brush with Fame is a British lifestyle game show that aired on ITV from 10 October to 4 November 2005 and hosted by Carol Smillie.

== Background ==
The programme series was initially piloted by Granada Television using the name Celebrity Face Paint.

== Format ==
The series took place in each of nine UK regions involving 900 contestants. One hundred people in each of the regions were given half an hour to produce a self-portrait using materials supplied by the programmers. Then, while the artists took a break, Carol and the two judges, Christian Furr and David Lee looked at the painted pictures and chose twenty five people to go into the next round and paint a celebrity guest. The artists could then use their own materials and any medium. Out of the 25, the judges then chose 10 who would go on to the next round and paint a second celebrity. Out of the 10, one finalist was selected and also one wild card show contestant who would compete with 8 others from the other regions in a wild card show for the chance to join the nine finalists in London.

The final challenged the ten finalists to paint a portrait of Coronation Street actor Malcolm Hebden, who was dressed as a clown. The winner received a cheque for £10,000 and also the opportunity to turn professional, with the offer of a deal with leading art publisher, Washington Green.
