= Mazowe River =

River in Zimbabwe and Mozambique

Coordinates: 16°23′17″S 33°47′05″E

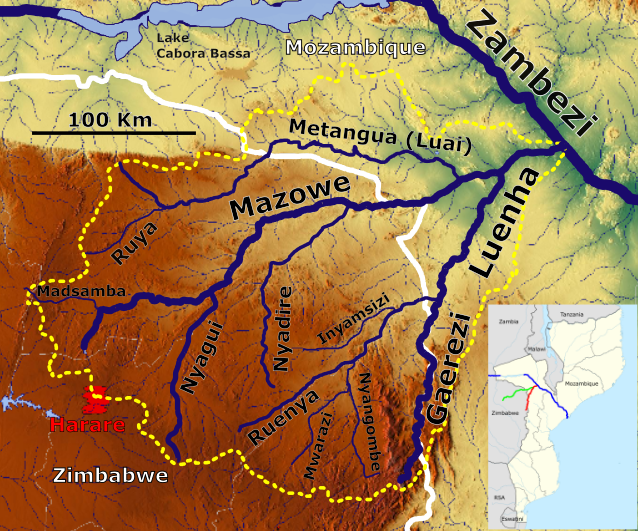
Mazowe River in the Luenha River catchment (center)

The Mazowe River (previously called Mazoe River) is a river in Zimbabwe and Mozambique, where it is called Rio Mazoe or Rio Mazoé.

The river rises north of Harare, flows north and then northeast, where it forms part of the border with Mozambique and joins the Luenha River, a tributary of the Zambezi River. The Mazowe has a catchment basin of about 39,000 square kilometres (15,058 sq mi). In 1920, the Mazowe Dam was constructed on the river forty kilometres north of Harare to irrigate citrus farms.

The river and its tributaries are a popular site for gold panners and small placer operations, although in the wet season, the Mazowe becomes a raging torrent, often breaking its banks and causing damage to local communities and farms.
