= Stanwell Place =

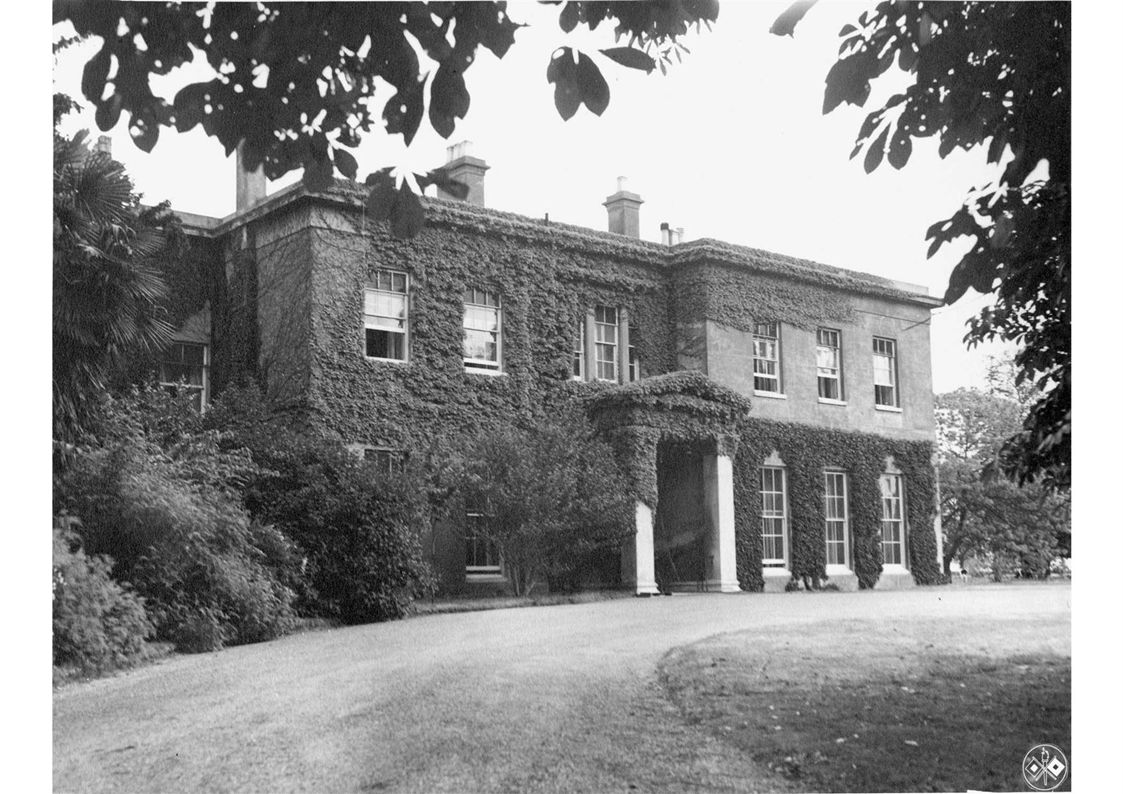
- Interactive map of the Stanwell Place area

General information
- Type: Rendered brick
- Location: Stanwell, Middlesex, United Kingdom
- Coordinates: 51.459°N 0.4912°W
- Completed: Early 19th Century
- Demolished: 1960s

Dimensions
- Other dimensions: Approximately 30 rooms

Stanwell Place was a manor house and associated estate and tenant farms, located to the west of the village of Stanwell, Middlesex. During the early part of the 20th century parts of the estate were sold off to create a reservoir and a series of local small holdings.

The manor house was constructed in the 17th century at least, standing about half a mile to the west of the parish church, north of Park Road. The site was acquired by Sir John Gibbons, 2nd Baronet, whose family owned the manorial rights from 1754 to 1933. The house had two storeys and was cement rendered with a low-pitched roof behind a parapet. The later west wing was built of red brick, and some of the outbuildings were older than the main house.

The surrounding park land was laid out in the 18th century. The bend at the entrance gates in Park Road is probably due to Sir John Gibbons diverting the road in 1760. After Gibbons had enclosed Borough Field in 1771, the Park extended from Oaks Road in the east to Borough Green to the north and was over 300 acres (1.2 km^{2}). The size of the park went down over the years, however.

The last of the Gibbons family to live there sold Stanwell Place to a civil engineer, Sir John Watson Gibson, in 1933. Gibson moved to Stanwell whilst building the Queen Mary Reservoir at Littleton (then the largest water storage reservoir in the world). He lived at Stanwell Lodge before his purchase of Stanwell Place (90 acres), and the adjoining Stanhope farm (261 acres, including Hammonds farm). In 1936 the Metropolitan Water Board bought most of Gibson's estate, in a contract encompassing 346 acres. It used this land in 1947 to develop the King George VI Reservoir.

During the Second World War, Gibson, as deputy director-general civil engineering (special) at the Ministry of Supply (1943–44), was one of the principal people responsible for the construction of the top secret Mulberry Harbours. It was as a result of this that he lent Stanwell Place to the SHAEF Commanders, and they held two top level meetings there during the buildup to D-Day and the Normandy Invasion. The highest level US commanders, including Henry L. Stimson, General George C. Marshall, General Dwight D. Eisenhower, Admiral Ernest J. King, and General of the Air Force Henry H. Arnold, stayed at Stanwell Place for these meetings.

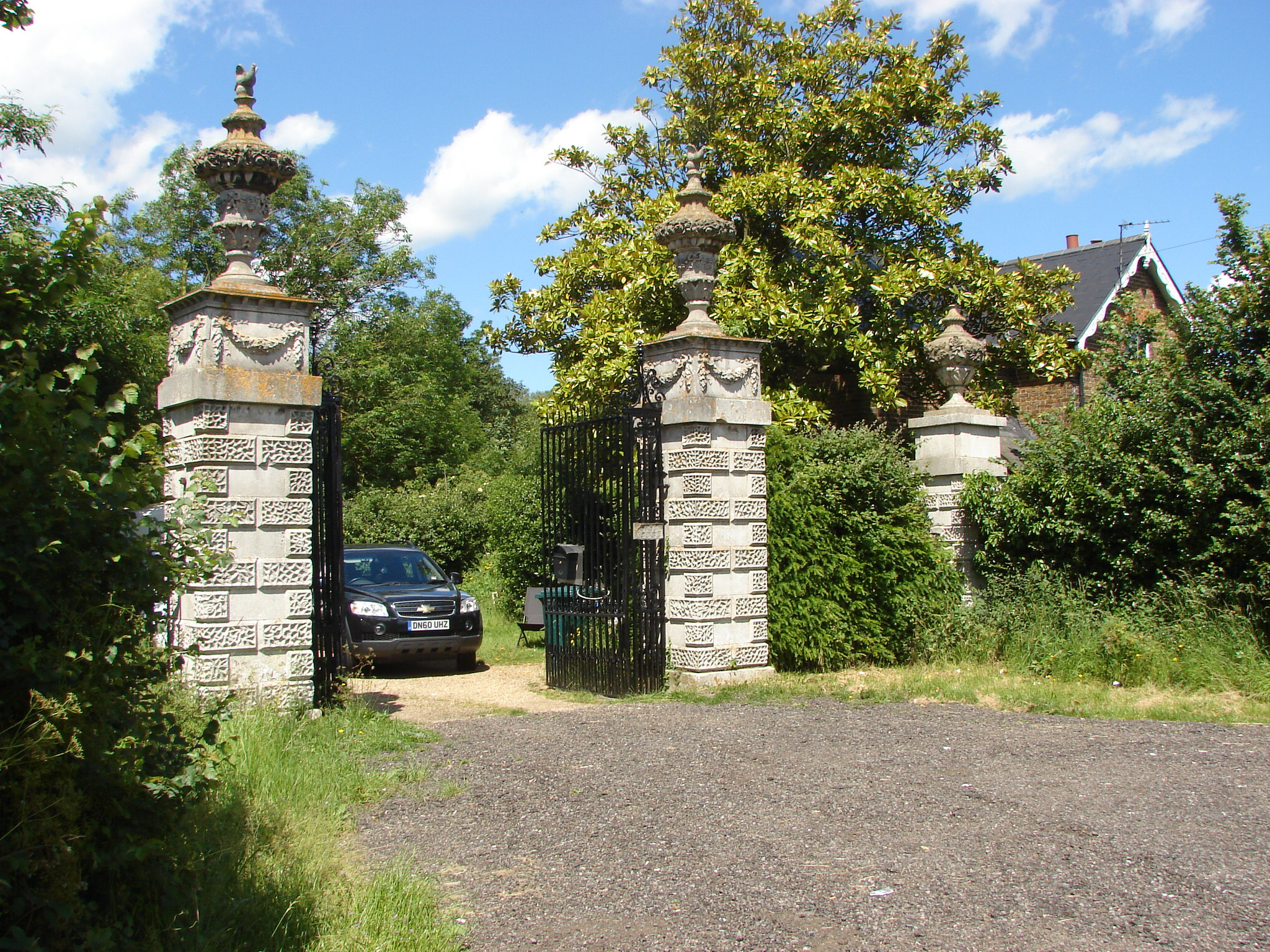
The original entrance gate has survived and is now a grade II listed structure

After Gibson’s death, Stanwell Place and 22 acres were sold to King Faisal II of Iraq, leaving 17 acres of Stanhope farm still in the ownership of Gibson's sons. After the assassination of King Faisal in 1958, the house and its grounds was purchased for gravel extraction. Despite local attempts to prevent it, the house was allowed to become derelict and was eventually demolished.

The original gates and piers which marked the entrance to Stanwell Place on Park Road have survived, and are now a grade II listed structure.

The house was used as the Manor House in the 1942 British war film “Went the Day Well?”
