= ITV Day =

Programming block on ITV1

- Network: ITV1/UTV
- Launched: 11 April 2005; 20 years ago
- Closed: 13 January 2006; 20 years ago
- Country of origin: ITV Day: England, Wales, Scottish Borders, Isle of Man, Channel Islands; UTV Day: Northern Ireland
- Owner: ITV
- Key people: Bruce Dunlop
- Format: Daytime programming
- Running time: 9.25 am to 6.00 pm
- Original language: English

ITV Day was a programming block that broadcast on ITV1 from 9.25 am until 6.00 pm on weekdays and launched on 11 April 2005. The presentation was created by Bruce Dunlop Associates and said "ITV Day effectively creates a new brand, with along with [sic] a change in programming and schedule will alter viewer perception".

The "ITV Day" brand disappeared from screens on 13 January 2006, as ITV1 presentation was relaunched, along with the entire ITV family of channels.

== Branding ==
The package was based around a logo and colour scheme that delineated the ITV Day branding from the rest of ITV1. The scheme of yellow, orange and red represented the colour of and warmth of the sun. The ITV logo remained blue as a link to the rest of the ITV family of logos (except ITV2's which was yellow at the time).

The package was produced using an innovative combination of live action and animation. The people featured in the idents were shot in the blue screen studio, while the backgrounds and some foreground elements were created in 3D.

=== Versions ===
UTV also used the same presentation during the day, albeit replacing the "ITV" logo with their own.

Scottish TV and Grampian TV (both owned by SMG plc) decided not to use the presentation package - and continued to use their normal idents and promotions during the day.

ITV1 Wales used the ITV Day logo but with "Wales" superimposed to the bottom.

== Programmes ==
- A Brush with Fame
- Baby House
- Boot Sale Treasure Hunt
- Cash Cab
- Chef Vs Britain
- CITV
- Date My Daughter
- Dial a Mum
- Everything Must Go
- Have I Been Here Before?
- ITV Lunchtime News
- The Jeremy Kyle Show
- Kojak
- Loose Women
- Make Me Perfect
- Mum's on Strike
- Nanny 911
- Nigella
- Now or Never
- The Paul O'Grady Show
- The People's Court
- Perseverance
- Richard Hammond's 5 O'Clock Show
- Solution Street
- The Springer Show
- This Morning
- Today with Des and Mel
- Too Many Cooks
- Trading Treasures
- Trisha
- Watching the Detectives
