= Quorn Handley =

English cricketer

Personal information
- Full name: Frederick Lester Quorn Handley
- Born: 11 August 1948 (age 78); Kampala, Uganda
- Batting: Left-handed
- Relatives: Bill Thomas (father-in-law)

Domestic team information
- Years: Team
- 1985: Minor Counties
- 1979: Minor Counties North
- 1969–1990: Norfolk

Career statistics
Competition	List A
Matches	10
Runs scored	84
Batting average	8.40
100s/50s	0/0
Top score	40
Catches/stumpings	3/–
- Source: Cricinfo, 29 June 2011

Frederick Lester Quorn Handley (born 11 August 1949) is a former English cricketer. Handley was a left-handed batsman. He was born in Kampala, Uganda.

Handley made his debut for Norfolk in the 1969 Minor Counties Championship against Staffordshire. Handley played Minor counties cricket for Norfolk from 1969 to 1990, which included 161 Minor Counties Championship matches and 18 MCCA Knockout Trophy matches. He made his List A debut for Norfolk against Middlesex in the 1970 Gillette Cup. He made 5 further List A matches for Norfolk, the last coming against Yorkshire in the 1990 NatWest Trophy. In his 6 limited-overs appearances for Norfolk, he scored 72 runs at an average of 12.66, with a high score of 40. He also captained Norfolk.

Playing for Norfolk allowed Handley to represent Minor Counties North in 2 matches in the 1979 Benson & Hedges Cup and the Minor Counties cricket team in 2 matches in the 1985 Benson & Hedges Cup.

== Personal life ==
In April 1980, in north Norfolk, Handley married Patricia M. Thomas. Her father Bill Thomas had also played for Norfolk and before that had played first-class cricket for Cambridge University.
