= Kirby College of Further Education =

Former education institution in Middlesbrough, England

Coordinates: 54.5558°N 1.2459°W

Kirby College of Further Education, formerly girls-only Kirby Grammar School, is a campus in Linthorpe, North Yorkshire, England. Founded in 1910 with the benefaction of Alderman Kirby, in its recent history it was part of Middlesbrough College, created via a merger of Kirby and Acklam Sixth Form College. This was further expanded with the inclusion of Teesside Tertiary College in 2002. In summer 2008, the various sites were consolidated onto a single site at Middlehaven.

== Current status ==
After several years of abandonment, the site has now been bought and is currently under redevelopment as The Old College - a set of residential apartments.

The developer, Green Lane Capital, plans to use the building to create 'upmarket' apartments.

== Gallery ==
Kirby Grammar School circa 1910

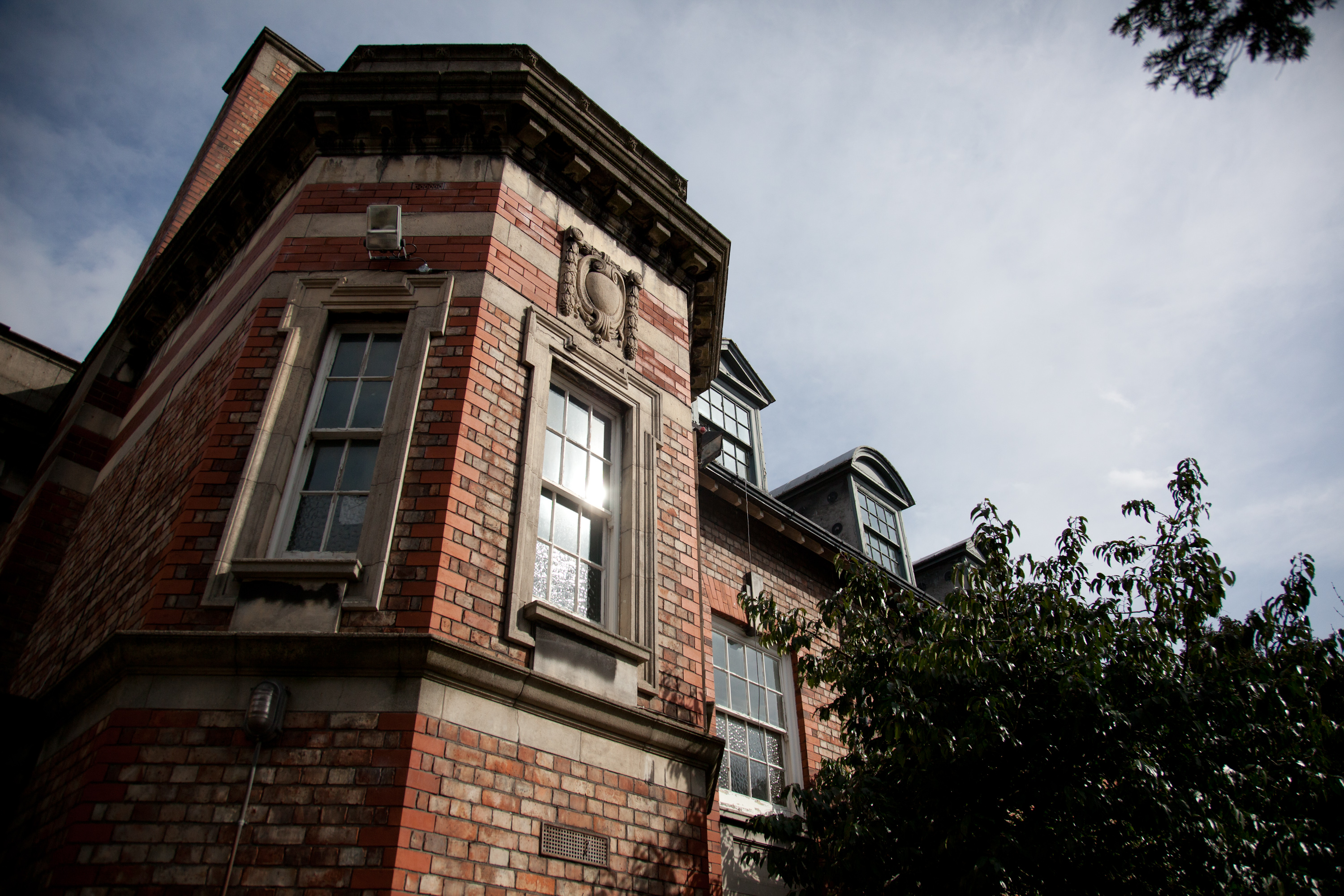
Recent photo of one of the wings

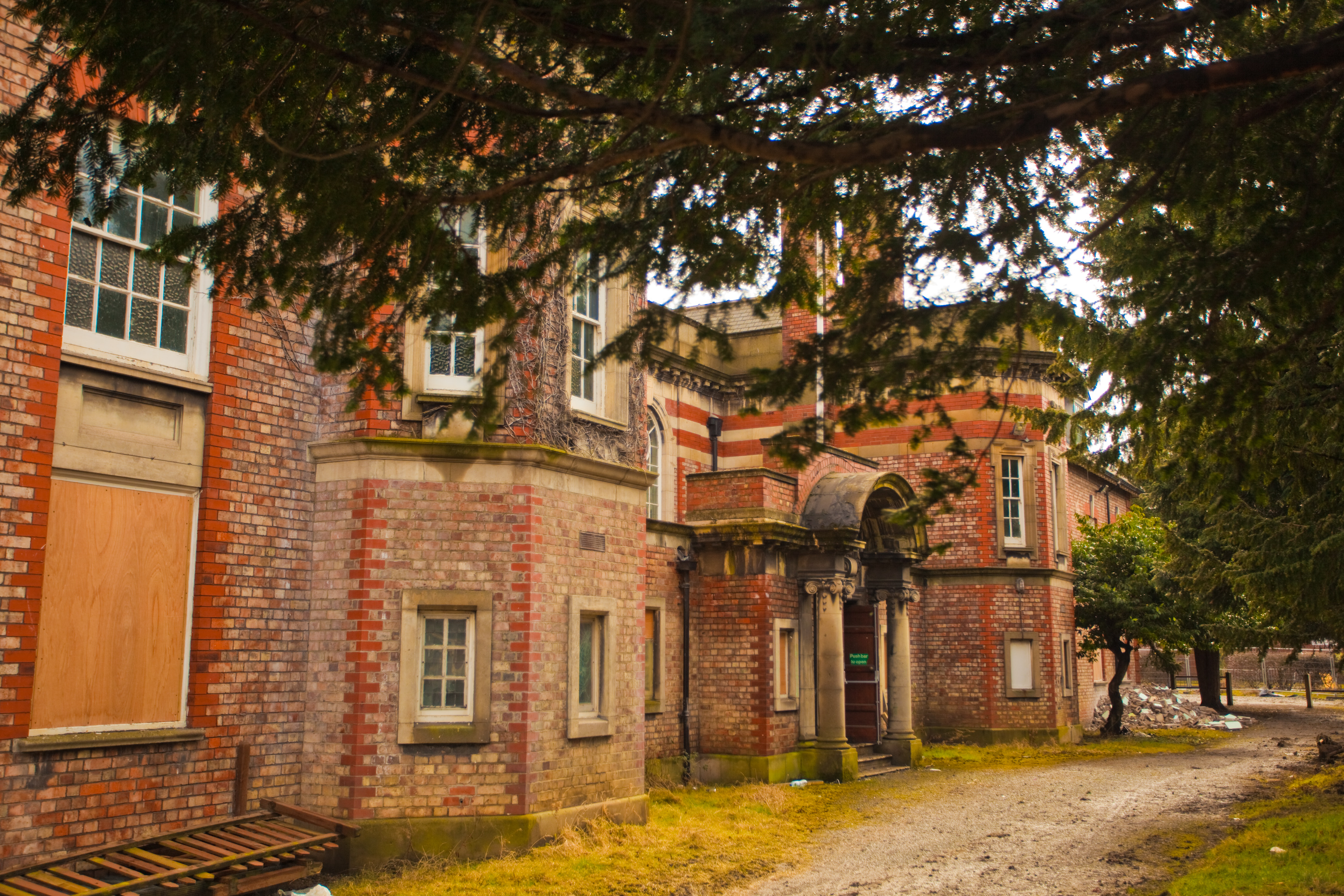
View of the front entrance to the building
