= Ayresome =

Area of Middlesbrough, North Yorkshire, England

Coordinates: 54.5658°N 1.25°W

- Location within North Yorkshire
- OS grid reference: NZ483192
- Unitary authority: Middlesbrough
- Ceremonial county: North Yorkshire
- Region: North East
- Country: England
- Sovereign state: United Kingdom
- Post town: MIDDLESBROUGH
- Postcode district: TS5
- Dialling code: 01642
- Police: Cleveland
- Fire: Cleveland
- Ambulance: North East
- Councillors: Janet Thompson (L)

Ayresome is an area of Middlesbrough, North Yorkshire, England. The settlement developed on West Lane and in some areas takes on the road's name. Most of the original settlement on the West Lane and the nearby original settlement of Newport became separated from the rest of the area’s population when the A66 road was built in the 1980s.

== Etymology ==
The name is made up of the elements "Ayre-" (also found in the River Aire) and dative plural "hūsum", the most likely meaning of Ayresome is therefore "river houses".

== History ==
During the A66's construction in the 1980s, the West Lane became two cul-de-sac roads: the road, Newport Lane and a new road to Ayresome Green Lane were all renamed to Acklam Road. The original southern end of the road was renamed Nursery Lane.

Over a third of the properties were void to the direct south west of Middlesbrough centre becoming part of the New Deal for Communities (organised by the West Middlesbrough Neighbourhood Trust) as a programme for housing renewal in 1999. Work then started on acquiring and demolishing 412 houses in preparation for redevelopment and (in 2004) Bellway Homes was appointed to lead the £50 million redevelopment.

West Lane Hospital (no longer on the West Lane due to the road renaming) was renamed Acklam Road Hospital when it was taken over by a different trust in 2021.

== Geography ==
The Newport and Ayresome electoral wards cover most of the Ayresome area with the addition of Whinney Banks in the Ayresome ward and Newport in the Newport ward. Parliament Road and Crescent Road is the main centre for shopping in Ayresome and neighbouring Gresham Road for Newport; Middlesbrough centre, Whinney Banks on Acklam Road and Linthorpe (Linthorpe Road and Roman Road) are surrounding areas which also serves Ayresome.

The area’s name is found in multiple road names in the area. A park off Heywood Street and Ayresome Gardens (formerly Ayresome Cemetery) to the north east of the area and the former Ayresome Park pitch are a green spaces in the area. Albert Park and the smaller Westbourne Park are near the area.

== Ayresome power station ==
Ayresome power station used the waste heat from industrial processes to generate electricity for use in the area.

Steam from industrial processes was delivered to the station’s steam turbine at 130 psi and 350 °F (9.0 barg and 177 °C). A 3 MW Richardson Westgarth turbo-alternator generated electricity at 2.9 kV. The power station was commissioned in 1934 and was owned and operated by North-Eastern Electricity Supply Company Limited prior to nationalisation of the electricity industry in 1948. Thereafter, it was owned and operated by the British Electricity Authority. Key historical data is shown in the table.

Ayresome power station output
Year	Running hours	Electricity sent out, MWh
1937		21,534
1946		8,167
1947		7,271
1948	7513	8,874
1950	8151	10,020
1954	8250	13,494
1955	8150	10,931
1956	8276	13,018
1957	7935	11,739
1958	7230	8,212

== See also ==
- Micky Moody
