= Pauling & Co. =

British civil engineering contractor

Pauling & Co. Ltd
- Company type: Limited company and latterly (after 1978) Public company
- Industry: Civil engineering
- Predecessor: Firbank, Pauling & Co., Pauling and Butler, Pauling, Elliot & Co.
- Founded: 1894
- Founder: George Pauling
- Defunct: 2 April 2002
- Successor: Pauling ltd
- Headquarters: Nottingham, Westminster, England
- Number of locations: wide, primarily Southern Africa and the Middle East
- Key people: George Pauling, Sir John Gibson
- Subsidiaries: Pauling (Middle East) Ltd, Pauling (Oman) L.L.C., Pauling Systems Ltd

Pauling & Co. was a major British civil engineering contractor renowned chiefly for building the railways of Southern Africa.

== History ==
Pauling & Co. was founded by George Craig Sanders Pauling in 1894. Pauling had previously built railways since 1875, trading variously as Firbank, Pauling & Co., Pauling and Butler in South Africa and Rhodesia as well as in Greece, Puerto Rico, from Haifa to Damascus and in England as Pauling and Elliot. Whilst undertaking civil engineering projects in England his partnership with Elliot was dissolved in 1894 and he formed Pauling & Co. and completed this contracting work.

By 1895 Pauling returned to South Africa and Rhodesia. Between 1900 and 1918 Pauling & Co. built hundreds of miles of railway in Rhodesia, Angola and Nyasaland and they were a major contributor to the development of the railways of Southern and Central Africa, including the greater part of Cecil Rhodes' unfinished Cape to Cairo Railway scheme.

Having been restructured in 1931, Pauling & Co. entered into partnership with contractor John Watson Gibson in 1933 forming Gibson and Pauling (Foreign) Ltd. in 1933 to build the Jebel Aulia Dam on the White Nile in Sudan. On the successful completion of the Jebel Aulia Dam, Gibson became managing director of Pauling & Co., a position he held until his death in March 1947.

During the Second World War Paulings undertook construction work for the war effort, including Royal Ordnance factories, and they were one of the 25 principal civil engineering contractors to build the Phoenix concrete caissons that formed the breakwaters to the Mulberry harbours.

In 1946 Pauling & Co. were employed by United Africa Company to undertake ground clearance for the ill-fated Groundnut scheme.

In the 1970s and 1980s Paulings undertook civil engineering schemes in the Middle East, particularly in the United Arab Emirates and Oman. In 1976 they were awarded the Queen's Award for Industry for export.

Companies House records that Pauling Ltd. was dissolved on 2 April 2002.

== Major projects ==
=== Railways ===
From 1894 to 1939, Pauling engineered 6,310 miles (10,150 km) of railway of which 5,922 miles (9,531 km) were in Africa. This formed the greater part of the Cape to Cairo Railway and the Benguela railway. In Britain, they did the Northholt to High Wycombe between 1901 and 1905; the first 100 kilometres of the Tete Railway in Mozambique 1939. They were also responsible for building the Letterkenny to Burtonport narrow gauge railway in Co Donegal, Ireland with their bridge design engineer Taggart Aston working on these constructions. He also then went to South Africa to work on Pauling's railways there.

=== Hydroelectric works ===
Pauling worked for the Tata Company in Bombay, including the construction of three large dams.

=== Harbours ===
Pauling worked on construction of Kilindini Harbour, Kenya; Beira Harbour, Mozambique; and the first part of Lobito Harbour, Angola.

=== Dams ===
The comp[any worked on Mazoe Dam, Zimbabwe and Magoto Dam (Note: Possibly one the Nkumpi dams near Magoto, South Africa) and, through an associated company, the Jebel Aulia Dam on the White Nile in Sudan for the Egyptian Government at a cost of over E£2,000,000 - 1933–1937; St. Saviour's Dam for the Guernsey States Water Board, and San Felipe Dam in Argentina, constructed by Pauling Argentina Lda.

=== War work ===
During World War II, Pauling engineered Royal Ordnance Factory 17, Featherstone, Staffordshire 1941; 9 No. A1 Phoenix Caissons for the Mulberry Harbours constructed in Southampton Graving Dock No. 5 -1943-1944. Construction of military camps at Oswestry, Chester, Rhyl, Wrexham, Gresford, Brecon and Prestatyn.

=== Roads and airports ===
Roads and airports included the central section of the Abu Dhabi-Alain Highway; Alain Roads; and Abu Dhabi International Airport Runway and Taxiways, 1974.

=== Other works ===
Pauling was involved in construction of steel prefabricated housing during post-World War II reconstruction. Others included: The Groundnut Scheme Ground Clearance, Tanganyika, 1946; construction of the American Embassy in Grosvenor Square, London in the period 1959–61; construction of the complete water supply scheme for the town (as it was) of Abu Dhabi in 1964–65; and construction of the new capital of Belize, called Belmopan, following the severe damage caused by Hurricane Hattie to the old capital (construction from 1967 to 1970).
