= Linthorpe =

Area of Middlesbrough, North Yorkshire, England

Coordinates: 54.55992°N 1.24296°W

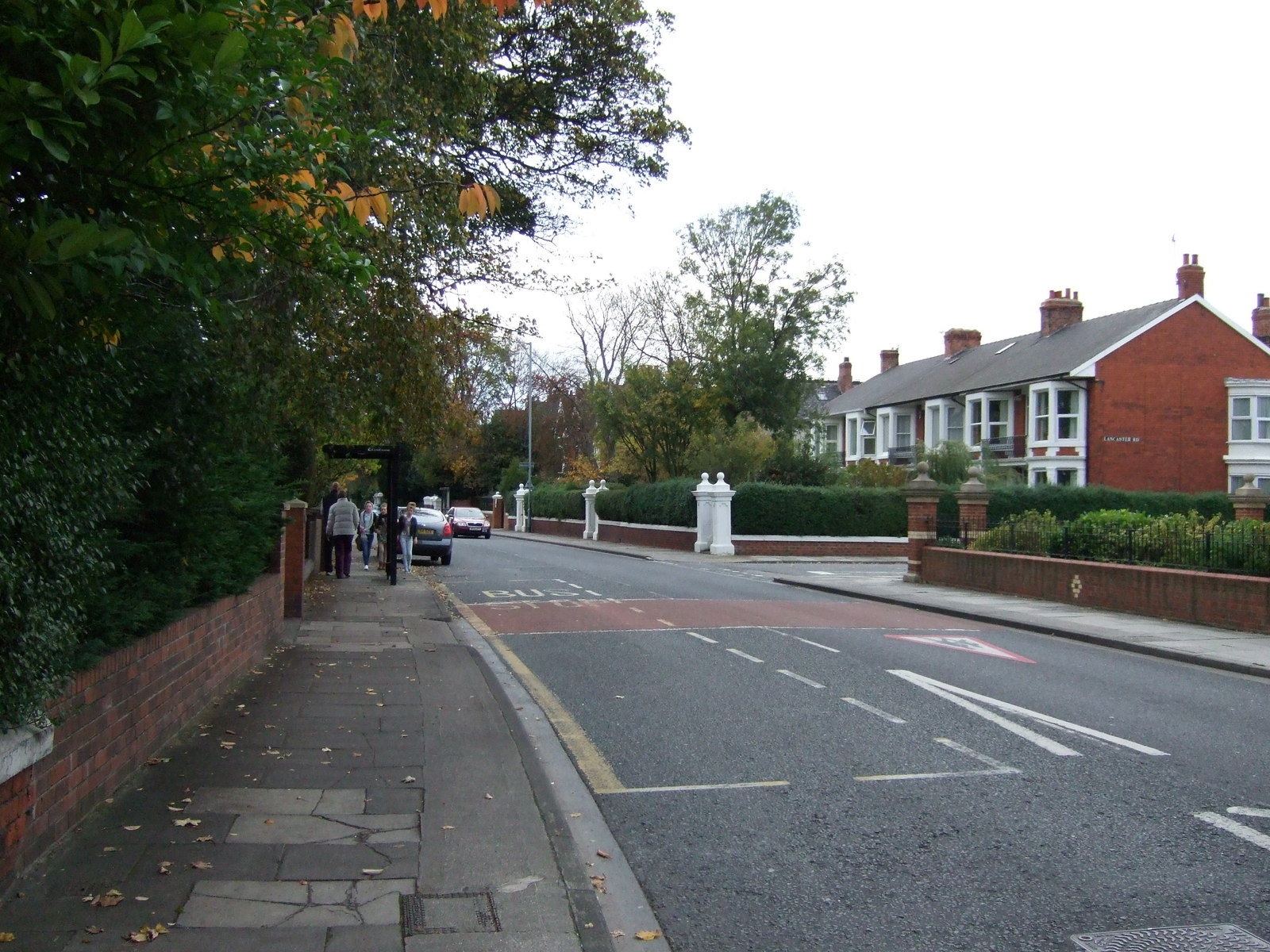
- The Avenue

- Location within North Yorkshire
- Population: 15,630 (Wards. 2011 census)
- OS grid reference: NZ490185
- Unitary authority: Middlesbrough
- Ceremonial county: North Yorkshire
- Region: North East
- Country: England
- Sovereign state: United Kingdom
- Post town: MIDDLESBROUGH
- Postcode district: TS5
- Dialling code: 01642
- Police: Cleveland
- Fire: Cleveland
- Ambulance: North East
- UK Parliament: Middlesbrough and Thornaby East
- Councillors: Naweed Hussain (L); Philippa Storey (L)

Linthorpe is a neighbourhood in Middlesbrough in the Borough of Middlesbrough, North Yorkshire, England. It borders the neighbourhoods of Acklam, Ayresome, Grove Hill, the town centre and Whinney Banks.

== History ==
Deriving from 'Leofa's village', the present name of Linthorpe has also been recorded as Levynthrop, Levingthorp and Linthrop. The original site was on Burlam Road, Roman Road was probably an original Roman route as can be seen on the map of Roman Cleveland. The present Linthorpe Cemetery was then the village green. 'Levingthorp' grew to included the hamlets of Ayresome and Newport.

The Blue Hall was a building situated on the corner of Roman Road and Burlam Road. It was reputedly used by smugglers from Newport. Inevitably a rumour exists that there was a subterranean passage from here to the manor house at Acklam; there is, however, no evidence to sustain this. The Blue Hall, demolished in 1870, could have been in existence as far back as 1618. Some of the white cottages of Old Linthorpe survived in St Barnabas Road until they were demolished in 1935.

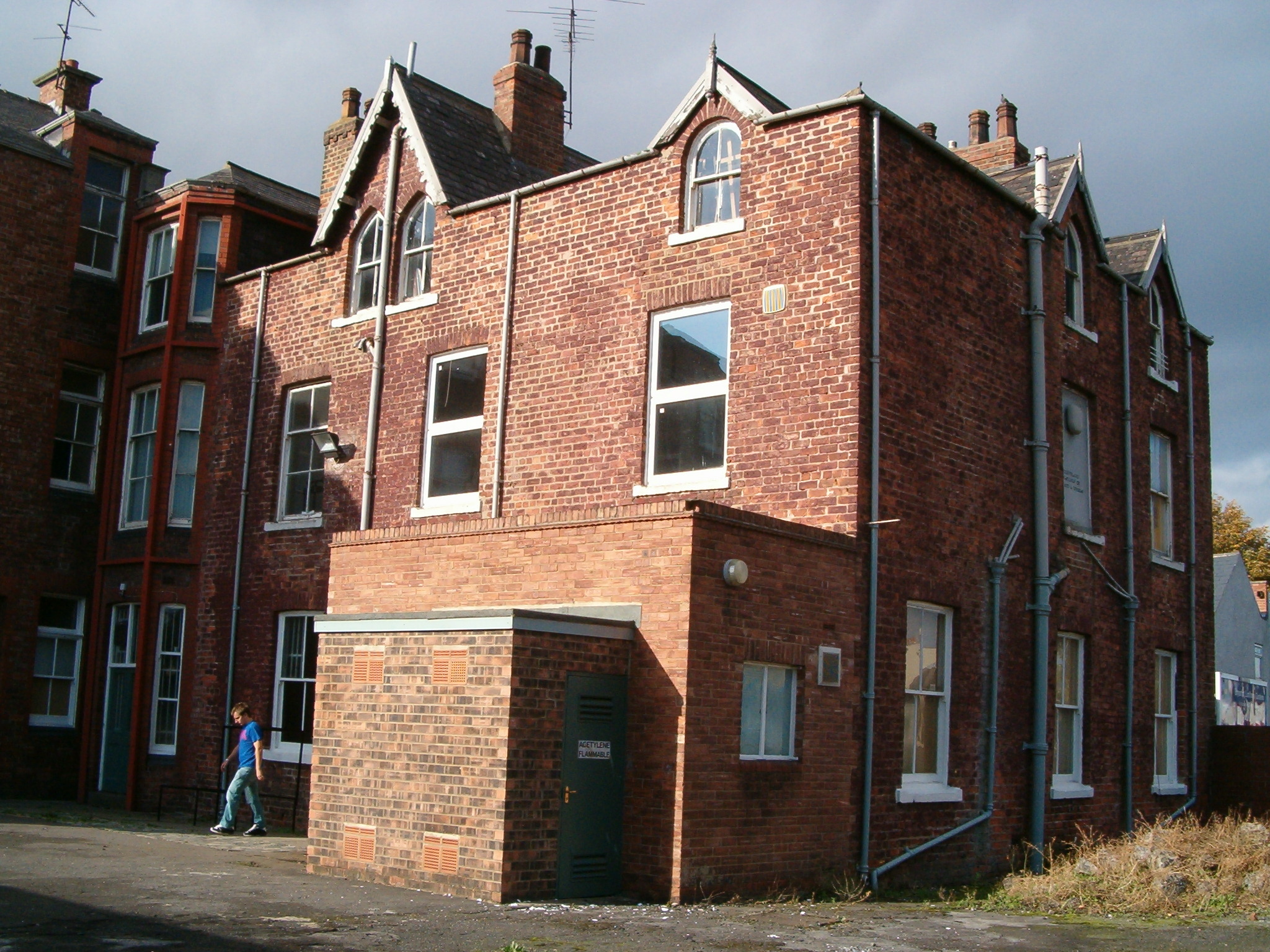
Former Workhouse on Burlam Road

Linthorpe Road was once known as Linthorpe Lane, being a main route from the original settlement of Middlesbrough. The Victorians were responsible for building the present Linthorpe village which they referred to as New Linthorpe. Albert Park was opened in 1868 by Prince Arthur, Duke of Connaught and Strathearn. It was created in the rural area of Linthorpe and presented by Henry Bolckow, one of Middlesbrough's ironmasters, at a personal cost of £3,000. The Victorian settlement of Linthorpe is located near the south of Linthorpe Road. In the late 19th century and early 20th century developers bought surrounding farmland and began to create a suburb of wide tree-lined avenues on which they built properties.

In 1872 West Lane Hospital was erected on land taken from Linthorpe Cemetery. It was to be a fever hospital.

The local Middlesbrough Football Club was formed on 18 February 1876 in the Talbot Hotel. The first recorded game was a draw against Teesside Wanderers in 1877. The matches were then played on the Archery Ground in Albert Park. In 1888 the Football League was formed but the following year the team split into Middlesbrough and Middlesbrough Ironopolis, and introduced professional football. They tried to amalgamate in 1891 but could not agree on a name or a ground; Ironopolis became financially unsound and folded in 1893. Middlesbrough kept its amateur status and continued by winning the Northern League. The club moved to Ayresome Park in 1903. Tim Williamson made his debut at Middlesbrough in 1902 and went on to become Boro's first England International player.

Linthorpe was formerly a township in the parish of Middlesborough [sic]. In 1866 Linthorpe became a separate civil parish; on 1 April 1913 the parish was abolished and merged with Middlesbrough and West Acklam. In 1911 the parish had a population of 438. Until 1974 it was in the North Riding of Yorkshire; from 1974 to 1996 it was in Cleveland.

== Buildings ==
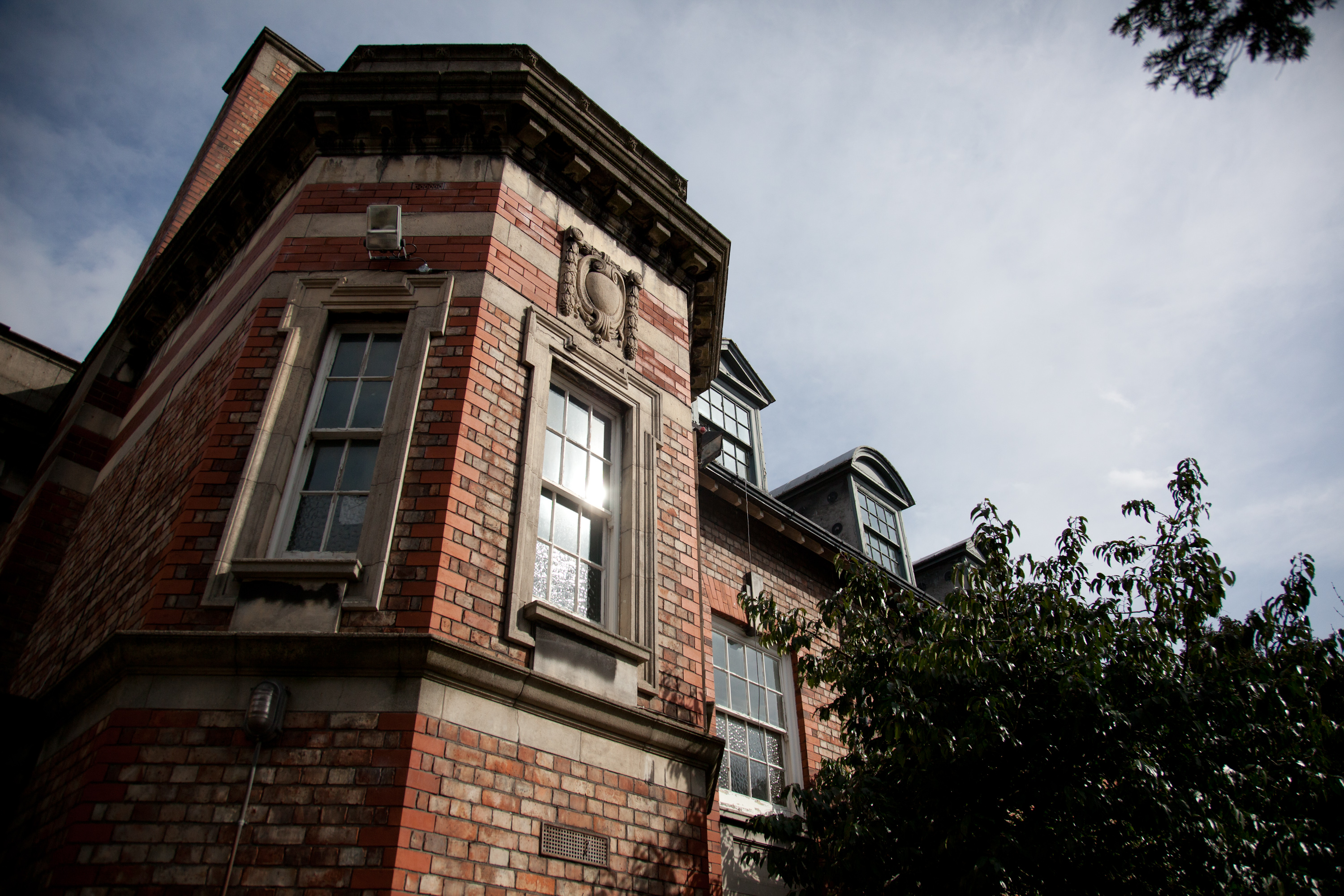
Kirby College

The Kirby College of Further Education, on Roman Road and a former grammar school for girls, was built with the benefaction of Alderman Kirby and the Carter Bequest Hospital was erected by a bequest from Alderman Carter. The original Edwardian building is now accommodation, additions during its time as a college were demolished. From 1976–2003, south Linthorpe was in the Kirby ward, named after the college.

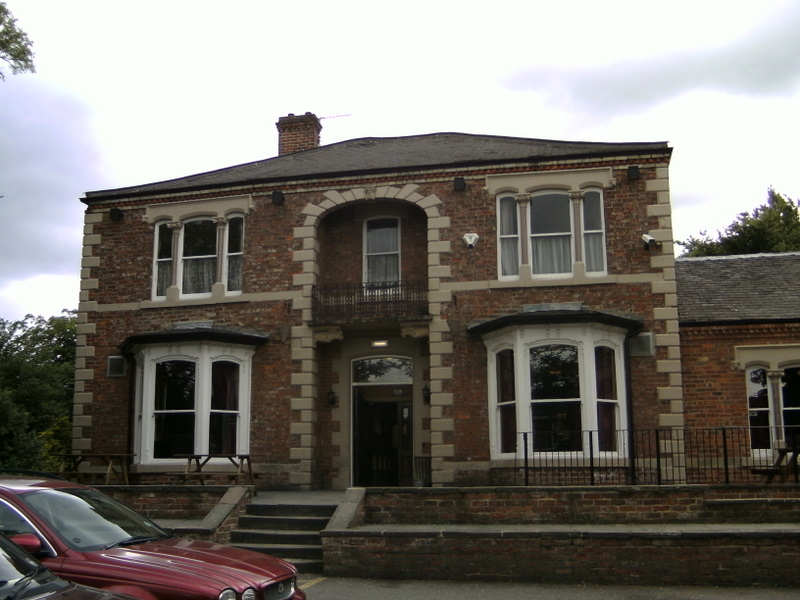
The Linthorpe Hotel

The Linthorpe Hotel public house, formerly a doctors surgery and residence, was opened in 1957 and stands within its own original expansive grounds. These grounds once contained a carriage turning circle, vegetable garden, orchard and lawns. The grounds still possess several mature trees around the perimeter.

The Middlesbrough Theatre (formerly the Little Theatre) was designed by architects Elder & De Pierro and was the first purpose designed theatre to be erected in post-war England when it was opened on 22 October 1957 by Sir John Gielgud.

The Broomlands, was a home set up for socially deprived children and orphans.

== Linthorpe Pottery Works ==
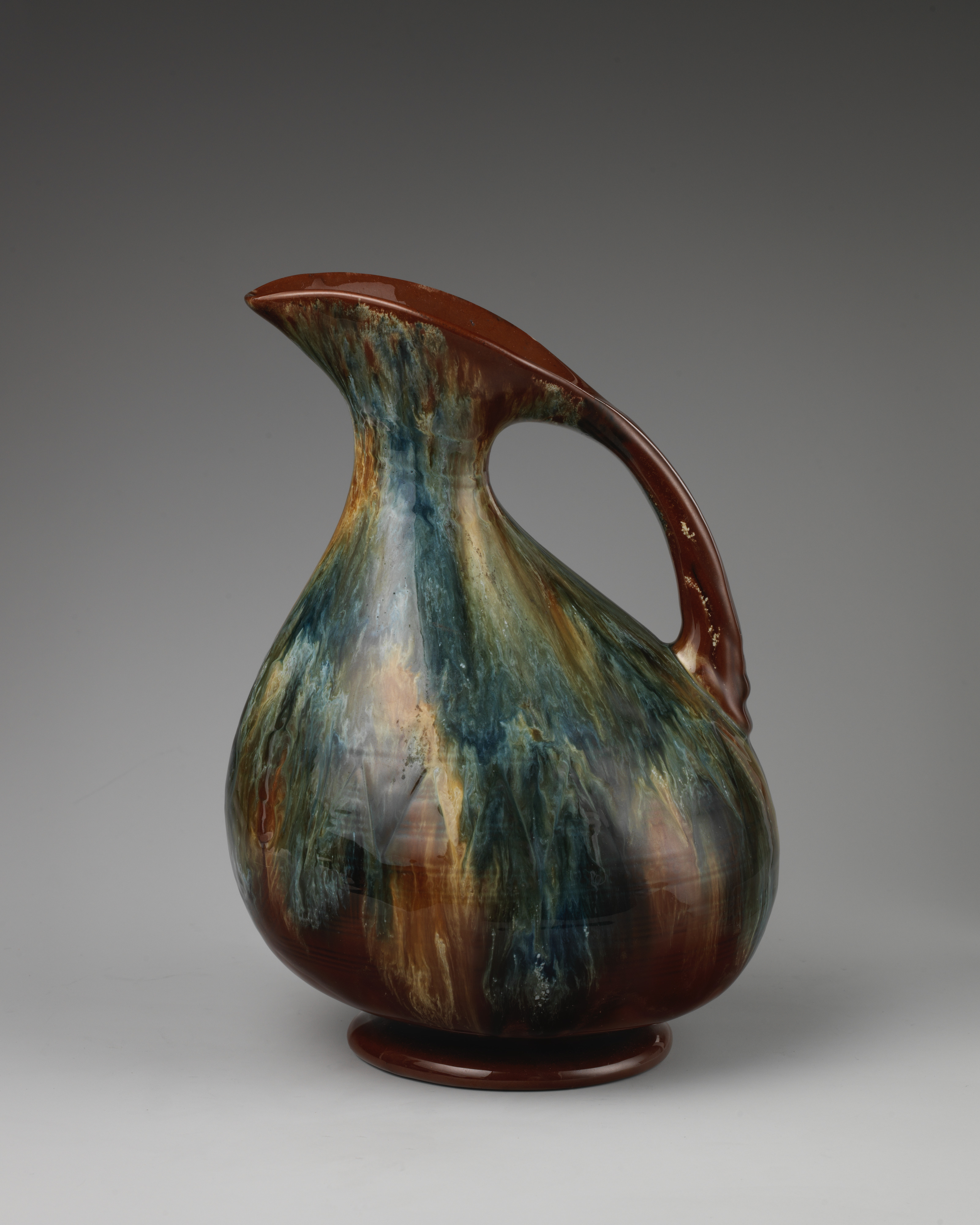
Jug, 1879-82

The Linthorpe Art Pottery was a born of a collaboration between renowned orientalist and designer Dr. Christopher Dresser and local businessman, John Harrison, who was the proprietor of the Sun Brick Works based in Linthorpe village. It operated between 1879 and 1891. It was noted for the boldness of colour and high glaze, as well as being the first commercial pottery to use gas-fired pottery kilns. The largest collection of the Linthorpe Art Pottery ware in the world was assembled at the Dorman Memorial Museum.

In 1897 the site of the pottery was proposed as a zoological garden – in a manner of Belle Vue Gardens. This promised a dance room, side shows, sensations and novelties, fireworks and a permanent zoological collection with hundreds of strange animals and birds – all for sixpence. Some 20,000 people attended the opening but found it to be some sort of hoax. There were hardly any attractions, just a few meagre cages of monkeys and birds on show. It lasted seven days and, apparently, for weeks afterwards the bodies of the animals were seen floating on the Pottery Pond. Belle Vue Road is said to be named after the ill-fated zoo and is the only reminder of this fanciful project. More recently the site of the pottery was used as a laundry facility.

== Religion ==
Also in 1872 the first church services to be held in Linthorpe were in Olive's Gym adjoining the Park Hotel. The following year they were held in the Linthorpe cemetery church. The foundation stones for the first 'proper' church were laid in September 1891. It was in 1897 that this Linthorpe parish church of St Barnabas was opened 'free of debt'.

== Education ==
Linthorpe Schools were originally opened as the Wesley Day School on 9 January 1871. On that first day the log: book reads '14 scholars were admitted'. The first week's fees amounted to three shillings. The number of children gradually increased over the following months. Although absences were common the reasons were investigated and usually logged as being 'satisfactory'. Today the schools are housed in two separate buildings – infant and junior – on the site in Roman Road.

== Notable people ==
- Bob Mortimer, comedian
- Chris Rea, singer, was born in Linthorpe
- Jerry Desmonde, actor, was born in Linthorpe.
- Marion Coates Hansen, women's suffrage campaigner, lived in Linthorpe prior to 1911.
- Bill Thomas, cricketer

== See also ==
- Linthorpe Cemetery
- Linthorpe Road West Cricket Ground
- Ayresome Park
- Sacred Heart Church
- Dorman Museum

Adjacent areas

- Acklam
- Grove Hill
- West Lane
- Whinney Banks
