= Jebel Aulia Dam =

White Nile dam near Khartoum, Sudan

Coordinates: 15°14′17″N 32°29′018″E

Jebal Aulia Dam
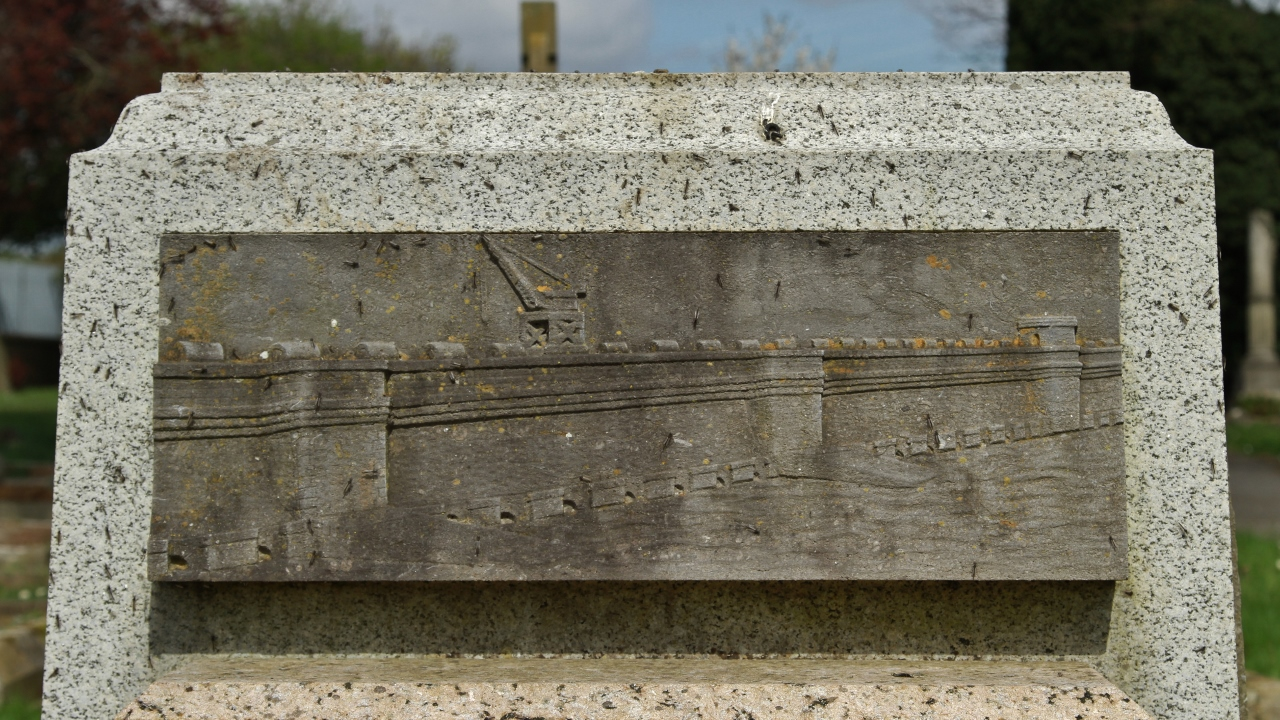
- Relief in Middlesex (now Surrey) depicting the dam
- Interactive map of Jebal Aulia Dam
- Country: Sudan
- Status: Operational
- Construction began: 1933
- Designed by: John Watson Gibson

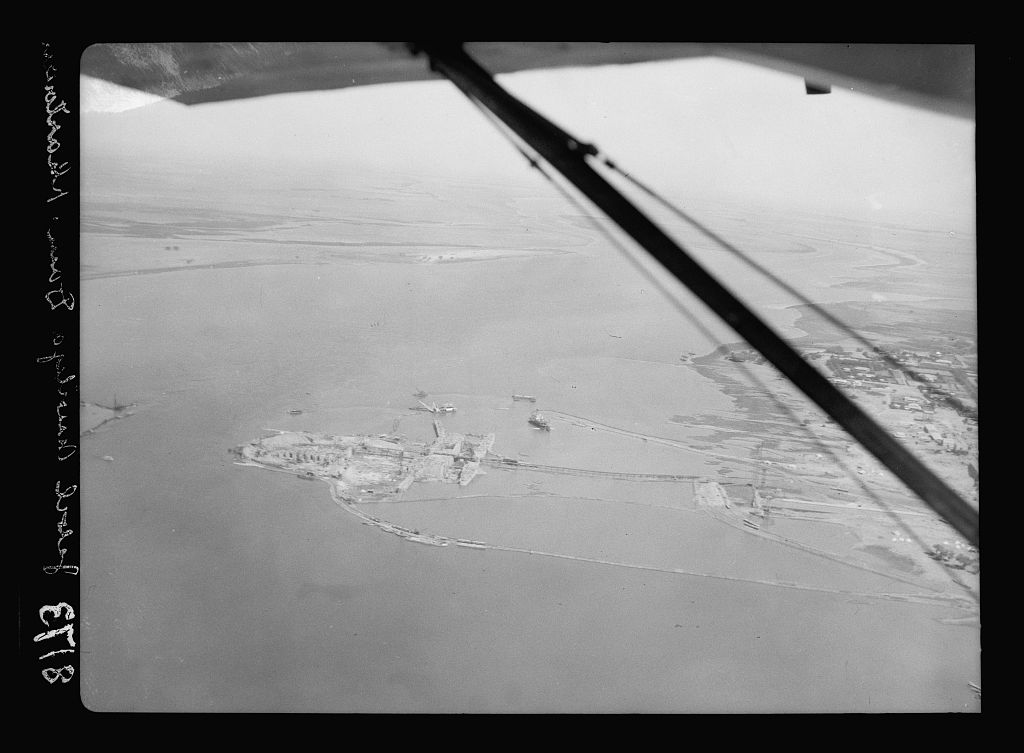
Aerial photograph of the Jebal Aulia Dam under construction in 1936

The Jebal Aulia Dam is a dam on the White Nile near Khartoum, Sudan. Its construction began in 1933 and was completed in 1937. When completed it was the largest dam in the world.

The dam was built by Gibson and Pauling (Foreign) Ltd, which was a partnership between the British civil engineering company Pauling & Co. and the civil engineer John Watson Gibson.

In 2003 a hydroelectricity project with a 30-megawatt (40,000 hp) maximum capacity was completed on the dam. This increased the structure's strategic value, so it is now continually guarded by the Sudanese Armed Forces.

In November 2023 the Jebel Aulia Bridge, part of the Jebel Aulia Dam complex, was destroyed amid heavy fighting in Jabal Awliya. A Sudanese official said the dam itself remained intact.

In December 2024, the Rapid Support Forces accused the Sudanese Armed Forces of damaging the dam in airstrikes, causing flooding in White Nile State. The SAF accused the RSF of causing the reservoir to flood horizontally by closing the dam.

In August 2026, Egypt and Sudan have reached an agreement to rehabilitate the dam after it was damaged during shelling by Rapid Support Forces.
