= Whinney Banks =

Area in Middlesbrough, North Yorkshire, England

Coordinates: 54.556000°N 1.269000°W

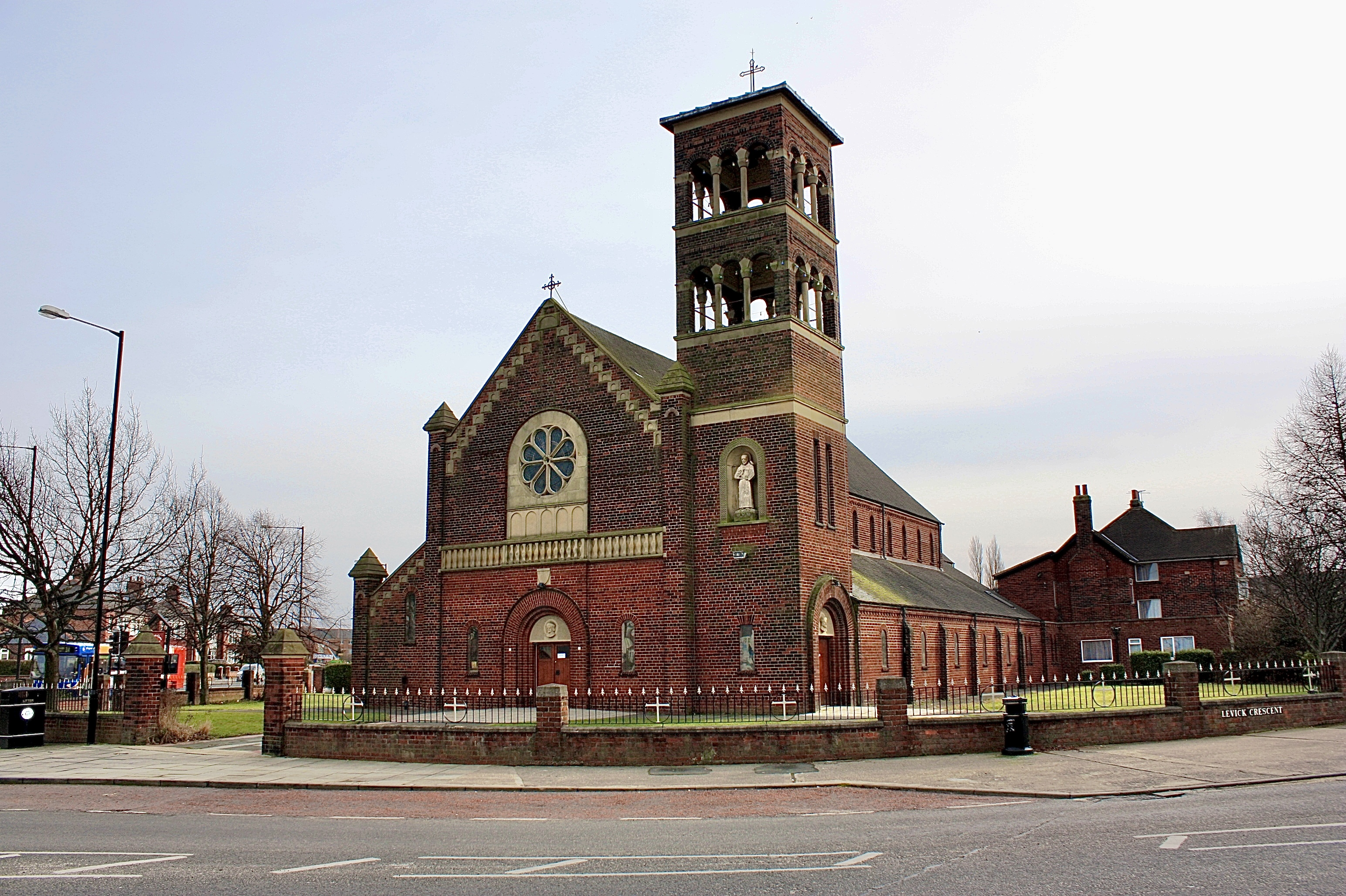
- St Francis of Assisi Church

- Location within North Yorkshire
- OS grid reference: NZ476181
- Unitary authority: Middlesbrough
- Ceremonial county: North Yorkshire
- Region: North East
- Country: England
- Sovereign state: United Kingdom
- Post town: MIDDLESBROUGH
- Postcode district: TS5
- Police: Cleveland
- Fire: Cleveland
- Ambulance: North East
- Councillors: Ayresome Ward: Janet Thompson (L)

Whinney Banks is an area in west Middlesbrough, North Yorkshire, England. The area is on the Old River Tees's southern banks, the river's main flow was redirected with the Mandale Cut, the A19 is between the old river and the area. It is within the TS5 postcode area and a part of the Ayresome ward, along with parts of Ayresome.

== History ==
Whinney Banks was originally of around 550 houses, built in the 1930s and 1940s, forming part of a wider expanse of social housing in west Middlesbrough.

== Gallery ==
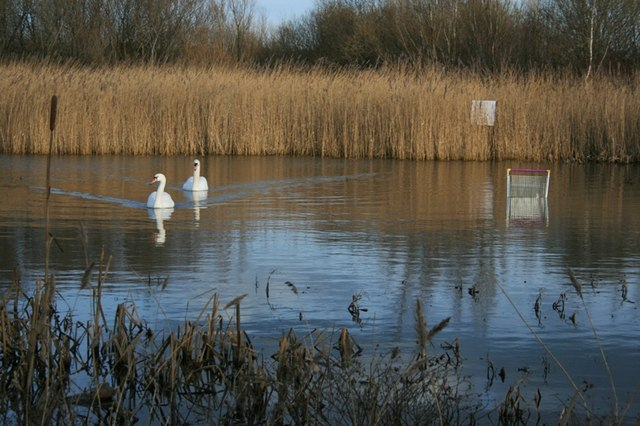
Whinney Banks Pond

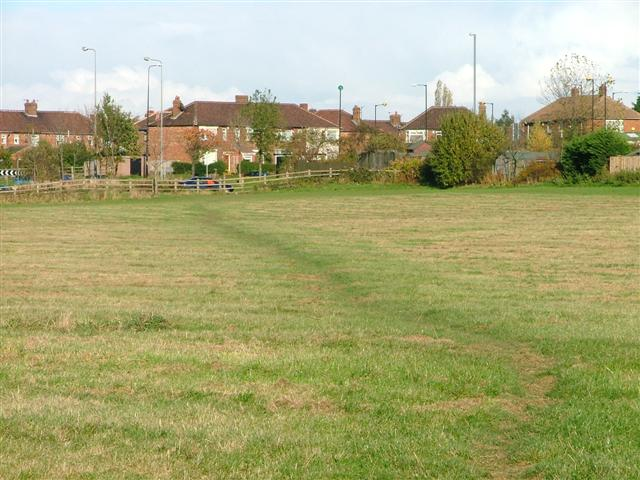
North part of Whinney Banks

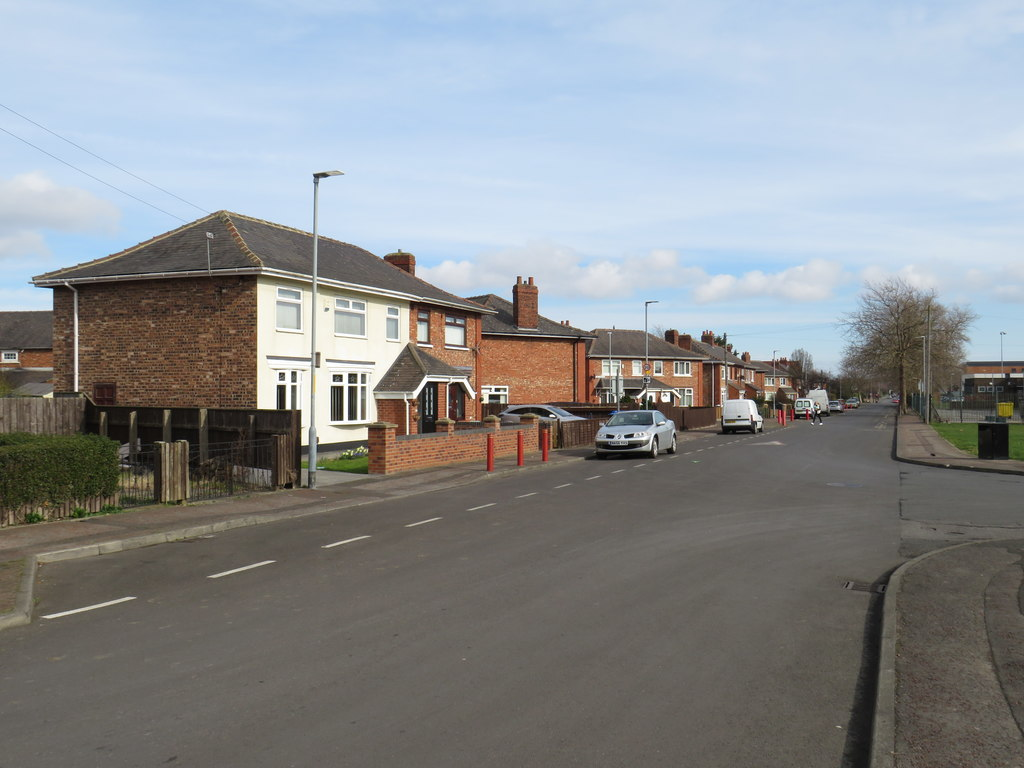
Stainsby Road
