= Acton (surname) =

Acton is an English surname. Notable people with the surname include:

- John Dalberg-Acton, 1st Baron Acton (1834–1902): Lord Acton, the Catholic historian
  - Richard Lyon-Dalberg-Acton, 4th Baron Acton (1941–2010), his great-grandson, Labour peer and life peer
  - John Lyon-Dalberg-Acton, 5th Baron Acton (born 1966), his great-great-grandson, writer and farmer
  - Sir John Acton, 6th Baronet (1736–1811), his grandfather, admiral and Prime Minister of the Kingdom of Naples
  - Charles Januarius Edward Acton (1803–1847), his uncle, Cardinal of Santa Maria della Pace
  - Guglielmo Acton (1825–1896), his first cousin once removed, officer in the Neapolitan Navy, attempted to intercept Garibaldi at Marsala
  - Harold Acton (1904–1994), his distant cousin, writer, dandy and dilettante
- Abraham Acton (1893–1915), British Army soldier
- Alejandro Acton (born 1972), Argentine cyclist
- Alfredo Acton (1867–1934), Italian admiral, politician and Chief of Staff of the Italian Navy
- Amy Acton, (born 1966) politician and governor-elect of Ohio
- Anna Acton (born 1979), British actress
- Ben Acton (1927–2020), Australian ice hockey player
- Brian Acton (born 1972), American computer programmer and Internet entrepreneur
- Brian Acton (born 1985), American transportation designer and product designer
- Brigitte Acton (born 1985), Canadian alpine skier
- Bud Acton (born 1942), American basketball player
- Carlo Acton (1829–1909), Italian composer and pianist
- Charles Acton (disambiguation)
- Cheryl Acton, Utah state legislator
- Dawn Acton (born 1977), English actress and deejay
- Edward Acton (disambiguation)
- Eliza Acton (1799–1859), English poet and cook
- Ferdinando Acton (1832–1891), Italian naval admiral and politician
- Forman S. Acton (1920–2014), American computer scientist and writer
- Garrett Acton (born 1998), American baseball player
- H. B. Acton (1908–1974), British writer and philosopher
- Henry Acton (1797–1843), English Unitarian minister
- James Acton (1848–1924), English cricketer
- James M. Acton, British academic and scientist
- Joe Acton (1852–1917), English wrestler
- John Acton (disambiguation)
- Keith Acton (born 1958), Canadian former National Hockey League player
- Loren Acton (born 1936), American physicist and astronaut
- Laurence Acton (senior) (died 1386/7), English MP
- Laurence Acton (junior) (died 1410), English MP
- Marv Acton (born 1944), American NASCAR driver
- Matt Acton (born 1992), Australian association football player
- Prue Acton (born 1943), Australian fashion designer
- R. G. Acton (1864/1865–1900), American football coach
- Ralph Acton (fl. 14th century), English theologian and philosopher
- Sir Richard Acton, 5th Baronet (1712–1791), English baronet
- Robert Acton (1497–1558), English politician
- Samuel Acton (c. 1773–1837), English architect
- Scott T. Acton, American professor
- Shane Acton (1946–2002), English sailor known for circumnavigating the globe
- Thomas Acton (Jesuit) (1662–1721), English Jesuit and missionary
- Thomas C. Acton (1823–1898), American public servant, politician, and police commissioner of the New York City Police Department
- Thomas Acton (British Army officer) (1917–1977)
- Sir Walter Acton, 2nd Baronet (c. 1621–1665), English landowner and politician
- Whitmore Acton (c. 1677–1731/2), British baronet and politician
- William Acton (disambiguation), several people with this name, including:
  - William Acton (doctor) (1813–1875), British doctor and writer

== See also ==
- Acton family, 13th-century English political family
- Marion Adams-Acton (1846–1928), Scottish novelist
- Murray Adams-Acton (1886–1971), English art and architecture historian, and interior designer
- Dalberg-Acton
- Baron Acton
