= Lyon-Dalberg-Acton =

Lyon-Dalberg-Acton may refer to:

- John Lyon-Dalberg-Acton (disambiguation), several people
- Richard Lyon-Dalberg-Acton (disambiguation), several people

== See also ==
- Dalberg (disambiguation)
- Acton (surname)
- Lyon (surname)
- Dalberg-Acton
