= Dahlberg (surname) =

Dahlberg is a locational or ornamental Swedish surname based on the location where the original name's bearers lived. Translated directly from Swedish to English, Dal means "Valley" and berg means "Mountain". Notable people with the surname include:

- Adam Dahlberg (born 1993), American YouTuber
- Anton Dahlberg (born 1985), Swedish sailor
- Arthur C. Dahlberg (1896–1964), American dairy scientist
- Edward Dahlberg (1900–1977), American novelist and essayist
- Edwin T. Dahlberg (1892–1986), American peace maker and church leader
- Erik Dahlbergh (1625–1703), Swedish count, engineer, soldier, and field marshal
  - Erik Dahlberg Secondary School
- Gotthard A. Dahlberg (1884–1948), American politician
- Gregory R. Dahlberg (born 1951), American Secretary of the Army
- Gunhild Dahlberg (born 1975), Norwegian television presenter, journalist, and author
- Gunnar Dahlberg (1893–1956), Swedish physician, eugenist and geneticist
- Ingetraut Dahlberg (1927–2017), German information scientist and philosopher
- Ingrid Dahlberg (born 1941), Swedish Theater Manager and President of Dramaten (Swedish Royal Dramatic Theatre)
- Heléne Dahlberg (born 1971), Swedish biathlete
- Hjalmar Dahlberg (1886–1962), Swedish runner
- James Dahlberg, American scientist
- Johan Dahlberg (born 1987), Swedish ice hockey player
- Jonas Dahlberg (born 1970), Swedish artist
- Kenneth C. Dahlberg, American engineer and corporate executive
- Kenneth H. Dahlberg (1917–2011), American businessman and World War II fighter ace
- Linda Dahlberg, American public health researcher
- Mae Dahlberg (1888–1969), Australian music hall and vaudeville performer
- Mikael Dahlberg (born 1985), Swedish soccer player
- Nathan Dahlberg (born 1964), New Zealand professional cyclist
- Nicklas Dahlberg (born 1985), Swedish professional ice hockey goaltender
- Olle Dahlberg (1928–1997), Swedish speed skater who competed in the 1956 Winter Olympics
- Ragnar Dahlberg (born 1943), Swedish television presenter and producer
- Sandra Dahlberg (born 1979), Swedish singer
- Teresa Abi-Nader Dahlberg, American academic administrator and engineering professor
- Theodor Dahlberg (1884–1963), Swedish wrestler
- Tove Dahlberg (born 1973), Swedish singer
- Wesley P. Dahlberg (born 1917), American automobile designer
