= Dahlberg =

Dahlberg may refer to:

- Dahlberg (surname), including a list of people with the name
- Dahlberg Arena, in Missoula, Montana, U.S.
- Dahlberg Electronics, now Miracle-Ear

== See also ==
- Dalberg (disambiguation)
- Thymophylla tenuiloba, the Dahlberg daisy
- Dahlberg Borer Newcomer syndrome, a rare genetic condition
