= Trent Valley Way =

116-mile footpath in north-eastern England

Coordinates: 52.8789°N 1.2409°W

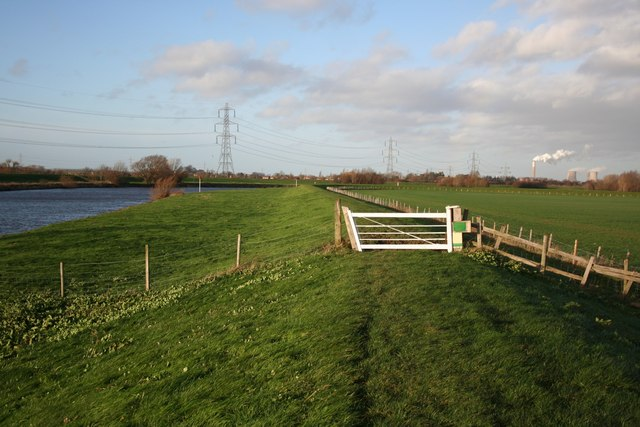
- The Trent Valley Way with Clapper gates near North Clifton
- Length: 187 km (116 mi)
- Location: Nottinghamshire, Lincolnshire
- Trailheads: Trent Lock, Derbyshire; Alkborough, Lincolnshire
- Use: Hiking
- Highest point: 74 metres (243 ft)
- Season: All year Round
- Sights: The valley of the River Trent

The Trent Valley Way is a waymarked long-distance footpath in England following the River Trent and its valley in the counties of Nottinghamshire and Lincolnshire.

Originally created in 1998, to mark the centenary of the Nottinghamshire County Council, it was waymarked between the two southern starting points at Thrumpton and Attenborough, through to West Stockwith near Gainsborough at the northern limit of the county, a distance of some 84 miles.

This Nottinghamshire route used both riverside paths and footpaths in the wider valley to link Nottingham, with Newark-on-Trent, Gainsborough and various villages via points of interest. It appeared on Ordnance Survey maps, and a book showing the route was also produced.

The waymark consisted of a white disc with a blue arrow containing three wavy white lines.

== Extending the Route ==
Various organisations were interested in extending the route of the Trent Valley Way so that it covered the entire length of the river from its source near Biddulph Moor in Staffordshire to Alkborough in Lincolnshire, where the Trent joins the Ouse to form the Humber estuary, a distance of 170 miles.

The feasibility of a complete route along the Trent Valley was investigated in 2008, and it was assessed to have "considerable potential", and would attract 250,000 annual walkers. These would enjoy the combined attraction of "the river’s rich natural heritage and its history as an inland navigation". A draft map using existing footpaths was drawn up in 2009 for the entire 170 mile route, with preferred and interim alternatives where there were major access issues.

One of the first revisions of the route was to remove the segment between Thrumpton to Nottingham, so that there was only a single starting point, which reduced the length to 77 miles. The start was then changed to Trentlock in Derbyshire, which extended the route slightly, so that it became 80 miles long.

=== Littleborough to Alkborough ===
Locations along the Trent Valley Way

Subsequently, plans were made to extend the path northwards along the tidal reaches to the Humber. In 2012 an extension of the waymarked route was confirmed, using paths mainly in North Lincolnshire to link the existing path with sections through to Alkborough, and a series of nine walking guides were produced to define this new 36 mile 58 km section. The first two sections act as a parallel route for part of the original valley way, but use riverside footpaths instead.

- Littleborough to Gainsborough
- Gainsborough to West Stockwith
- West Stockwith to Haxey
- Haxey to Epworth
- Epworth to Belton
- Belton to Keadby
- Keadby to Scunthorpe
- Scunthorpe to Burton Upon Stather
- Burton Upon Stather to Alkborough

The end of the route is the maze at Julian's Bower, which has a viewpoint that overlooks Trent Falls.

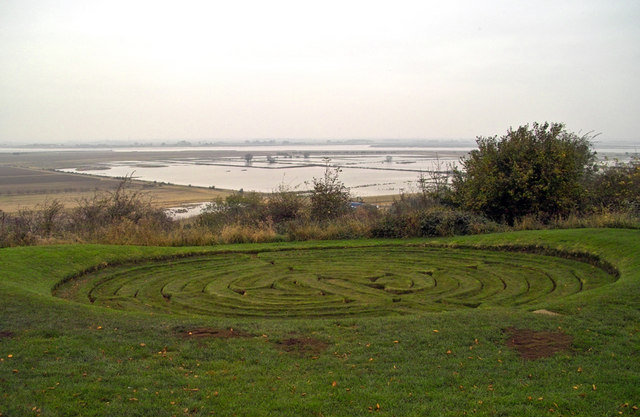
Julian's Bower at Alkborough

=== Biddulph to Stone ===
There are also plans to establish a definitive route in the upper reaches of the Trent, from Biddulph to Stone. A similar set of walking guides to those produced for the Littleborough to Alkborough section will be created, along with a waymarked route. A Heritage Lottery bid is being developed to fund this work.

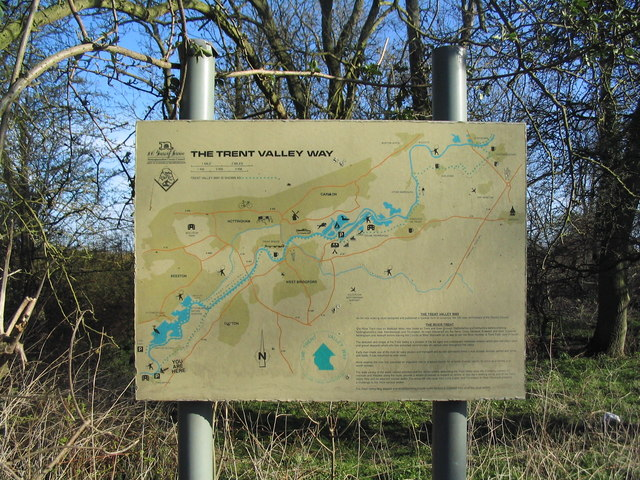
Sign at Thrumpton, one of the start points of the Trent Valley Way in 1998

== See also ==
- List of fish in the River Trent
