= Adalbert of Spalding =

English theologian writer

Adalbert of Spalding was a supposed English theological writer identified by Bale and Pitts, and discussed at length in the 1885 Dictionary of National Biography (DNB).

According to the DNB, Adalbert "is said by Bale and Pits to have been a Cluniac monk belonging to the abbey of Spalding in Lincolnshire, and to have flourished about the year 1160. Our early biographers give him great praise for his knowledge of the Scriptures and the fathers. They also speak in high terms of his elegance of style and his modesty in always following the opinions of these authorities rather than his own. His favourite author, they add, was Gregory the Great, from whose treatise upon Job (Moralia) he compiled his own work entitled 'De Statu Hominis,’ or 'Speculum Status Hominis.' An 'Epistola ad Herimannum Presbyterum' and certain 'Homiliæ' are also mentioned among his writings."

According to the Oxford Dictionary of National Biography, the identification of Adalbert arises out of Bale's error in identifying a manuscript as the production of Adalbert, rather than being a copy of other works. The error matches that of the identification of Ralph Acton, a supposed fourteenth century English theologian and philosopher, and leads the ODNB to remark that Bale is an "uncertainly reliable Tudor bibliographer".
