= Dalberg-Acton =

Dalberg-Acton is a surname. Notable people with the surname include:

- John Dalberg-Acton, 1st Baron Acton, KCVO, DL (1834–1902), English Catholic historian, politician, and writer
- Ferdinand Dalberg-Acton (1801–1837), British baronet

== See also ==
- Dalberg (disambiguation)
- Acton (surname)
- Lyon-Dalberg-Acton
