= Charles Acton =

Charles Acton may refer to:

- Charles Acton (critic) (1914–1999), English-born Irish music critic
- Charles Januarius Acton (1803–1847), English cardinal
- Bud Acton or Charles Acton (born 1942), American retired basketball player
- Carlo Acton or Charles Acton (1829–1909), Italian composer

== See also ==
- Acton (surname)
