= Thomas Acton =

Thomas Acton may refer to:

- Thomas Acton (Jesuit) (1662–1721), English Jesuit and missionary
- Thomas C. Acton (1823–1898), American public servant, politician, and police commissioner of the New York City Police Department
- Thomas Acton (British Army officer) (1917–1977)
