= Scott T. Acton =

- Education: Virginia Tech (B.S. in Electrical Engineering, 1988); University of Texas, Austin (M.S. in Electrical and Computer Engineering, 1990); University of Texas, Austin (Ph.D in Electrical and Computer Engineering, 1993)
- Website: www.ece.virginia.edu/faculty/acton.html

Scott T. Acton is the AT&T Professor of Engineering and chair of the Charles L. Brown Electrical and Computer Engineering Department of the University of Virginia School of Engineering and Applied Science, Charlottesville campus. Acton was born in California. He is the director of the Virginia Image and Video Analysis (VIVA) group. He works in the fields of video tracking and anisotropic diffusion.

Acton made his professional entry into software development prior to graduating high-school when a local software company commissioned him to develop an asteroids-and-aliens shooter called Space Raider which was released for the Commodore 64 in 1984.

Acton earned his B.S. degree (1988) from Virginia Tech, M.S.(1990) and Ph.D. (1993) degrees from the University of Texas at Austin, where his advisor was Alan Bovik. He is a Fellow of the IEEE., and served as editor-in-chief of the IEEE Transactions on Image Processing from 2014 to 2017. Acton has been at the University of Virginia since 2000. Before that time, he worked in the academic world for Oklahoma State University and in the engineering world for AT&T, Motorola and the Mitre Corporation.

In 2024, Acton was awarded a US$1.4 million research grant from Gates Foundation as co-principal investigator alongside Peter A. Youngs from University of Virginia, Jonathan Foster from University at Albany, and Adam Geller from Edthena, to research multimodal neural network system applicability to elementary math classrooms.

== Publications ==
He has published over 60 peer-reviewed journal articles, and 90 peer-reviewed conference presentations.

== Books ==
- S.T. Acton and N. Ray, Biomedical Image Analysis: Tracking, Morgan and Claypool Publishers, 2006.
- S.T. Acton and N. Ray, Biomedical Image Analysis: Segmentation, Morgan and Claypool Publishers, 2009.
