= Clapper gates =

Type of self-closing double gate

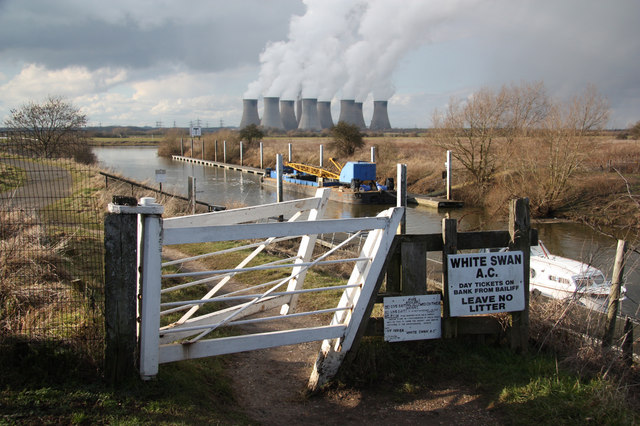
Clapper Gates at Torksey

Clapper gates are a distinctive type of self-closing double gate, unique to the navigable reaches of the River Trent. They were erected along the towpath of the river in the 18th century, and allow people and horses to pass through the field boundaries on the river bank, but prevent livestock from straying.

== History ==
A horse towing path (or haling path) along the navigable Trent, from Shardlow to Gainsborough was approved as part an Act of Parliament in 1783. But unlike canal towing paths, towpaths along rivers were not usually fenced off from the land alongside and required these self-closing gates where the path crossed the field boundaries.

== Construction ==
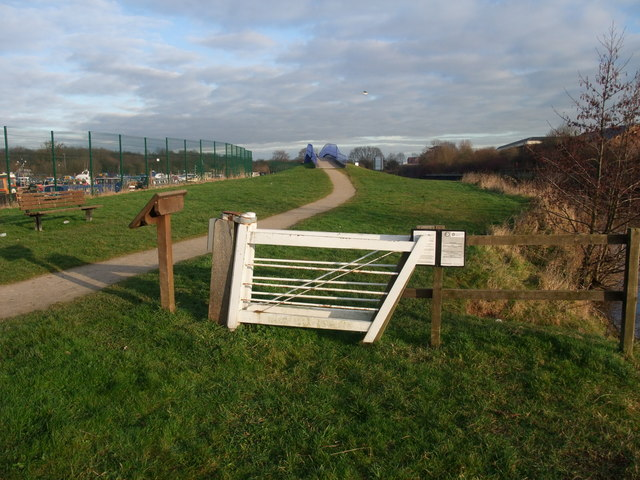
Restored Clapper Gates near Newark-on-Trent

The normal construction is of square timber rails, with three horizontal metal rods, and a single diagonal bracing rod. The design of the gate also includes an angled upright or stile, with the post on which the gates are parked, angled in the same way.

The two gates are hinged at the top and base using a metal band attached to a large post. This heel post is inclined slightly forward, which ensures that the gates are self-closing by their own weight.

The name comes from the fact that once released after opening, the gate comes together with its gate post making a sharp sound or 'clap' as it shuts. This is unlike a kissing gate, which only 'kisses' or lightly touches its frame.

== Heritage ==
They are seen as a key heritage feature of the River Trent bankside landscape, and efforts are being made to record and preserve them, in the Trent Valley between Farndon in Nottinghamshire and Gainsborough in Lincolnshire.

The Trent Valley Way, a long-distance footpath which follows the Trentside tow path for some of its length, passes through many of these gates on its route between Nottingham and Gainsborough.

== Gallery ==
Clapper Gates
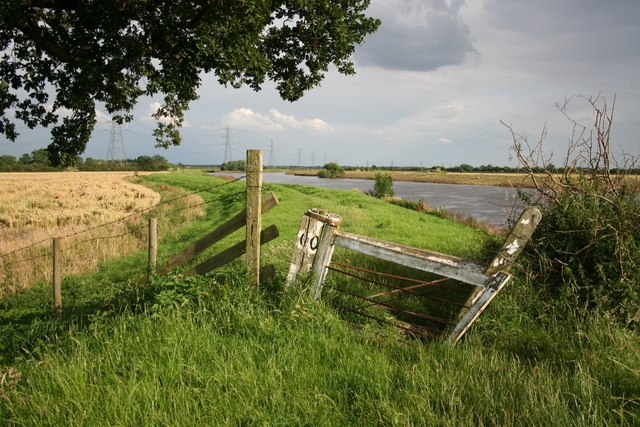
South Clifton

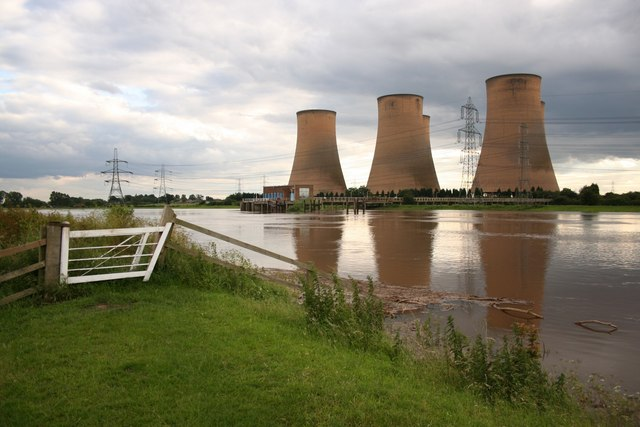
High Marnham Power Station

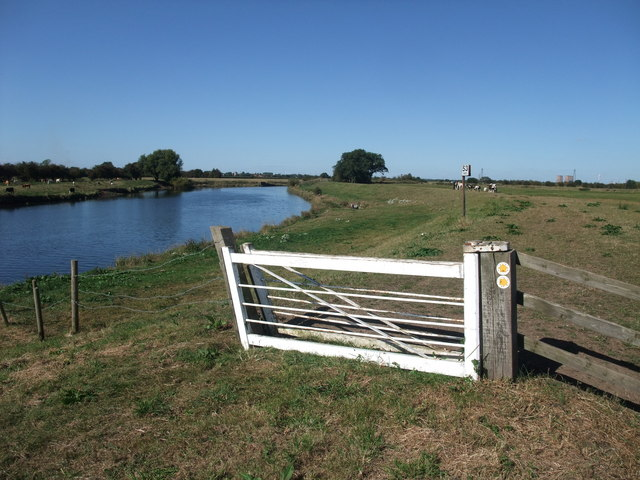
Carlton-on-Trent

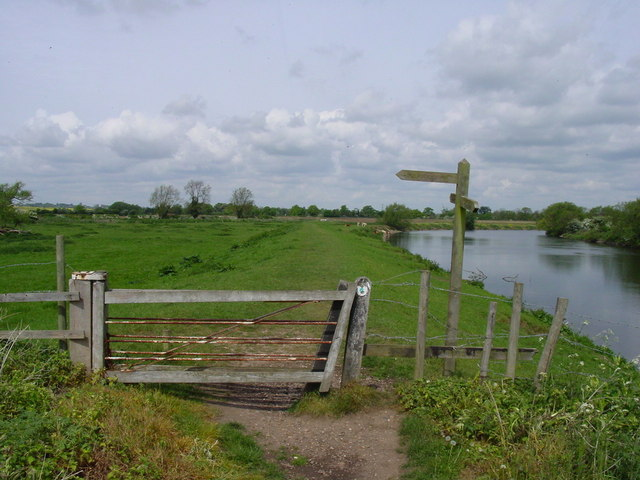
Fiskerton

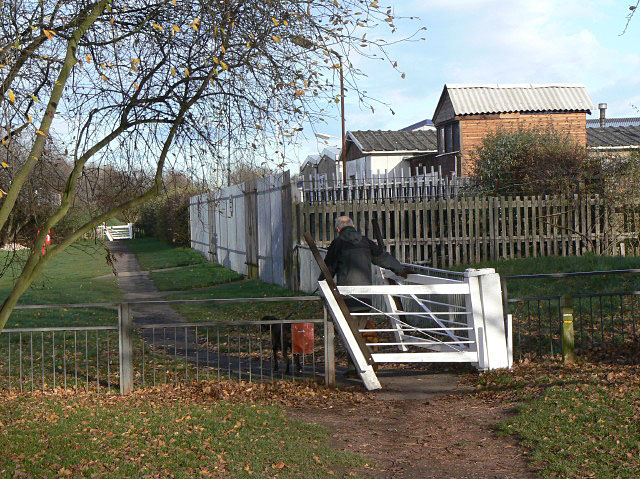
Farndon

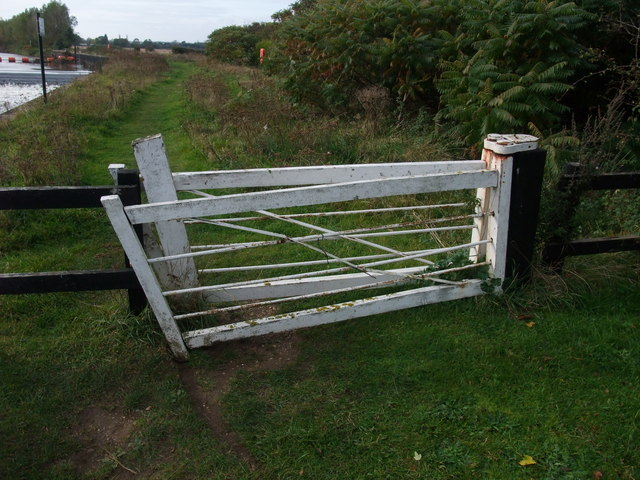
Hazelford Ferry

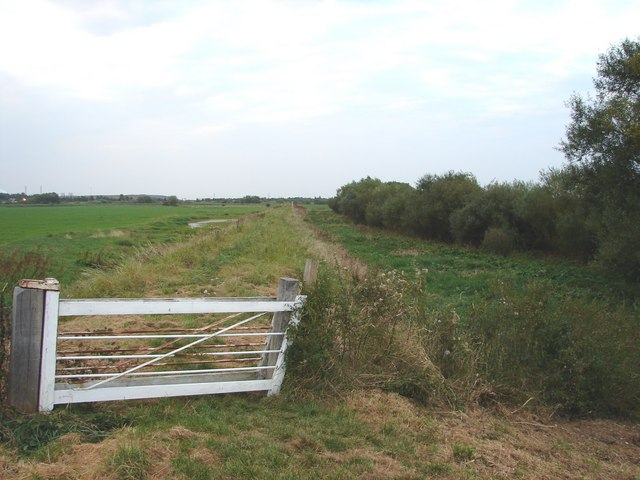
Torksey

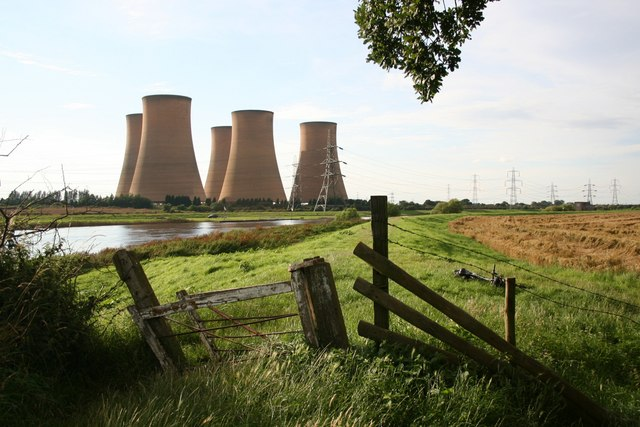
Trent Valley Way
