= Anthony Goldstone =

English pianist (1944–2017)

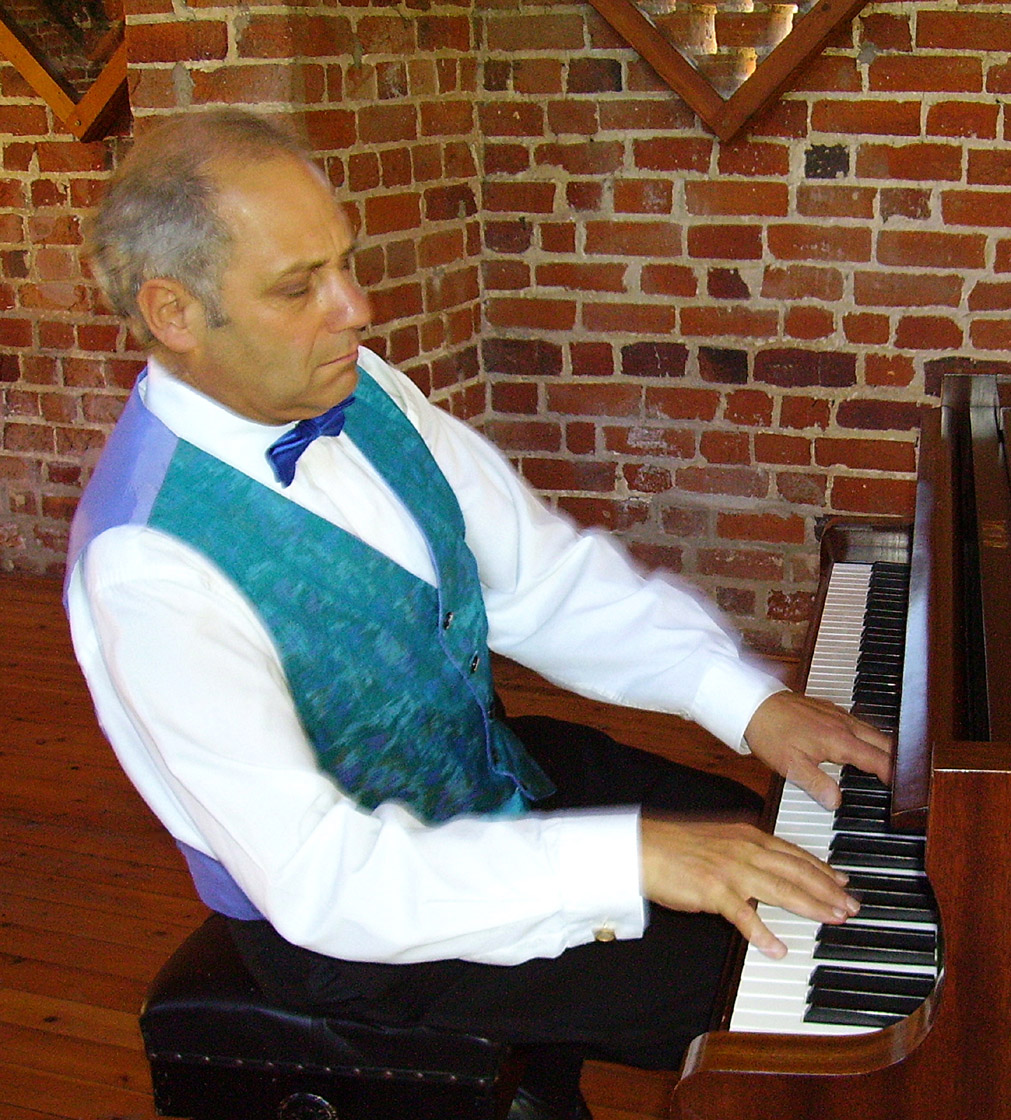
- Goldstone in 2017
- Born: 25 July 1944; Liverpool, Merseyside, England
- Died: 2 January 2017 (aged 72)
- Education: Royal Manchester College of Music
- Years active: 1965–2007
- Style: Classical

Anthony Goldstone (25 July 1944 – 2 January 2017) was an English pianist, known for his eclectic repertoire. He also played a prominent part in promoting works for piano duo with his wife Caroline Clemmow.

== Early life ==
Goldstone was born on 25 July 1944 in Liverpool. He grew up in Sale and attended Brooklands Primary School there, then Manchester Grammar School. Eschewing a scholarship to Cambridge, he entered the Royal Manchester College of Music (RMCM), now a part of the Royal Northern College of Music (RNCM). There, he studied with Derrick Wyndham, and later in London with Maria Curcio.

== Solo career ==
After his 1965 debut with the Royal Manchester College of Music orchestra under John Barbirolli, he went on to success in international piano competitions and had his London debut at the Wigmore Hall in 1969.

Among many concerto appearances, his most notable may have been at the Last Night of the Proms in 1976, in which he played Benjamin Britten's Diversions for Piano Left Hand and Orchestra. Afterwards, the composer wrote to him, "Thank you most sincerely for that brilliant performance of my Diversions. I wish I could have been at the Royal Albert Hall to join in the cheers."

He was an enthusiastic proponent of the completion of works left unfinished by their composers, most spectacularly recording a four-movement "complete performing edition" of Schubert's Unfinished Symphony for piano duet, with Caroline Clemmow.

== Goldstone and Clemmow piano duo ==
In 1984, Goldstone began a piano duo partnership with Caroline Clemmow, whom he later married in 1989.

They owned a pair of Grotrian-Steinweg grand pianos, which they kept in the local church of St John the Baptist in Alkborough, North Lincolnshire, which was also the venue for many of their recordings. Their recordings were widely praised with Gramophone magazine stating, "excellent sound and balance, too, the results always firmly focused and truthful in timbre", MusicWeb International finding that "the recording quality is excellent" and "the piano sound is very good; rich and full with plenty of detail", and The Classical Reviewer noting that "the church acoustic allows the music to expand magnificently" Only Stephen Pritchard, in a review in The Guardian, said of one such recording that the acoustics were "sepulchral", and "pour[ed] some pretty cold water over some very hot music".

== Personal life ==
Goldstone was active in performing and recording until the end of his life. Stephen Sutton, the founder of the Divine Art label, was quoted as saying, "Until the very last week, he was writing to me about his projects, retaining an amazing level of wit and even frivolity in what must have been extremely difficult circumstances".
