= Actonian Prize =

Septennial award conferred by the Royal Institution

The Actonian Prize was established by the Royal Institution as a septennial award for the "person who in the judgement of the committee of managers for the time being of the Institution, should have been the author of the best essay illustrative of the wisdom and beneficence of the Almighty, in such department of science as the committee of managers should, in their discretion, have selected". Each year the prize was to be awarded, announcements were published, and competitors for the prize were requested to send their essays to the Secretary of Royal Institution, Albemarle Street, London, and adjudication was made by the managers and announced a few months later.

The prize was named for Hannah Acton who in 1838 left £1,000 to the Royal Institution in memory of her husband, the architect Samuel Acton, the income from which was to be spent for prizes for the best essay on the beneficence of the Almighty, as illustrative of a department of science. The Royal Institution's Actonian Prize is now given to an invited lecturer and is not competitive.

The first prize of one hundred guineas was awarded to George Fownes for his Chemistry as Exemplifies the Wisdom and Beneficence of God published in 1844. At the time, he was the chemical lecturer at Middlesex Hospital.

Other recipients include:

- 1851 Thomas Wharton Jones, With the Wisdom and Beneficence of The Almighty as displayed in The Sense of Vision.
- 1858 No prize was awarded. The announced subject had been on solar radiation. The managers of the Royal Institution reported that no essay of sufficient merit had been received, and the money was carried forward for a future award, under the terms of the trust-deed.
- 1865 George Warington, The Phenomena of Radiation as Exemplifying the Wisdom and Beneficence of God.
- 1872 Two awards were made of one hundred guineas each (£105) for winning essays on the subject "The Theory of the Evolution of Living Things." One went to Rev. George Henslow who published his essay the following year under the same title. The other was given to Benjamin Thompson Lowne, who the next year published The Philosophy of Evolution.
- 1879 George Simonds Boulger for his essay on the "Structure and Functions of the Retina in all Classes of Animals, viewed in relation to the Theory of Evolution."
- 1886 Sir George Gabriel Stokes, president of the Royal Society
- 1893 Agnes Mary Clerke
- 1900 Sir William Huggins and Lady Huggins: Atlas of Representative Stellar Spectra (1900).
- 1907 Marie Curie for her essay "Recherches sur les Substances Radioactives."
- 1921 George Ellery Hale in recognition of his work on solar phenomena
- 1928 Archibald Vivian Hill
- 1935 William T. Astbury of the Department of Textile Physics, University of Leeds
- 1949 Alexander Fleming, the prize was still 100 guineas
- 1977 Ralph Louis Wain

== Related links ==
- Actonian Prize competition announcement in the journal Nature (1871)
- Review of Lowne's essay in The Popular Science Review (1873)
