= Edward Acton =

Edward Acton may refer to:

- Edward Acton (MP for Shropshire), 14th-century English politician
- Edward Acton (Royal Navy officer) (died 1707), captain in the Royal Navy
- Edward Acton (cricketer) (1871–1912), West Indian cricketer
- Sir Edward Acton, 1st Baronet (1600–1659)
- Sir Edward Acton, 3rd Baronet (c. 1650–1716), British MP
- Sir Edward Acton (judge) (1865–1945), English judge
- Edward Acton (academic) (born 1949), Vice-Chancellor of the University of East Anglia (2009–2014)
