= Alkborough =

Parish of 458 people in 192 households in North Lincolnshire, England

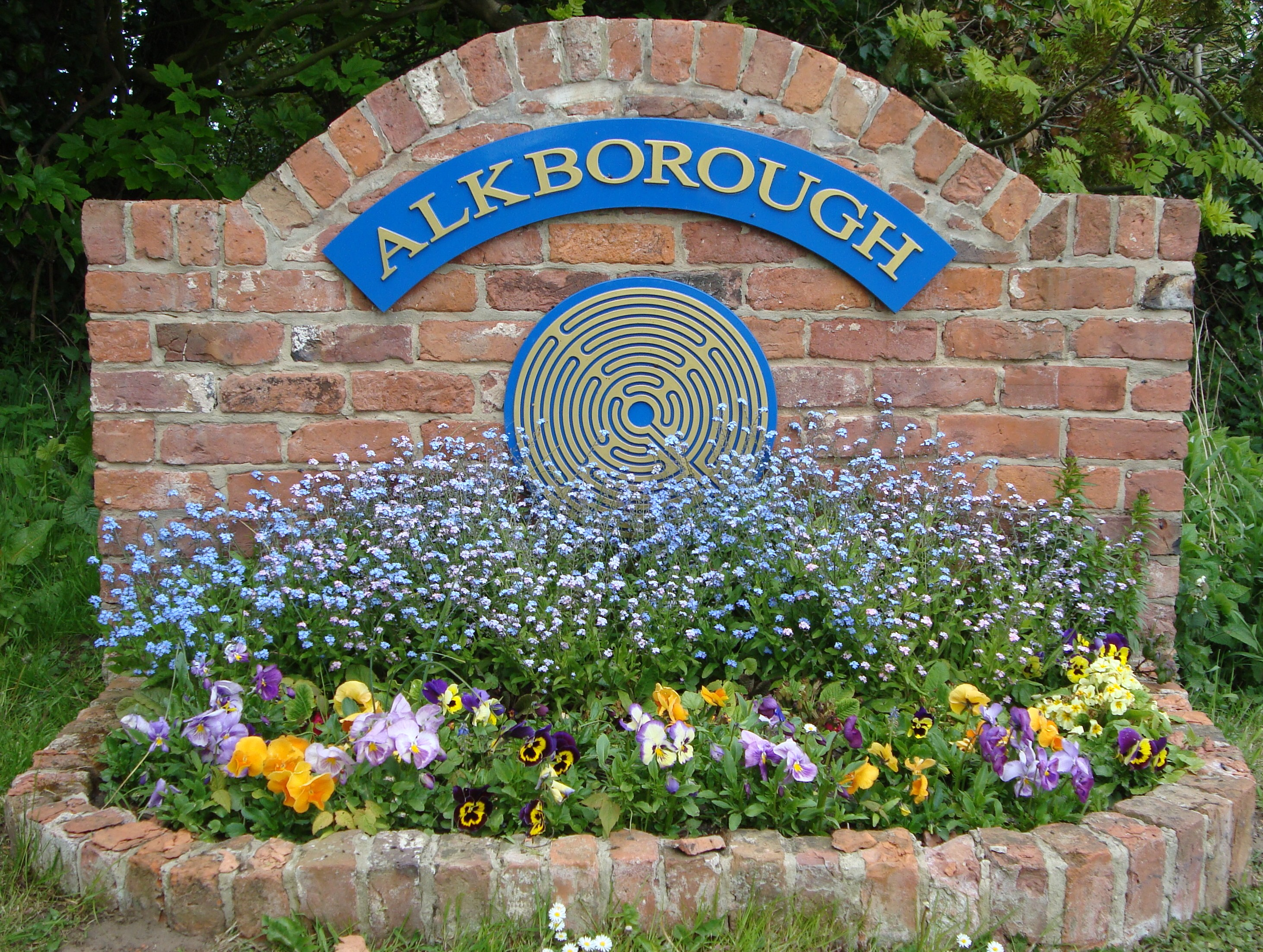
- The Alkborough village sign on Walcot Road

- Location within Lincolnshire
- Population: 471 (2021 Census)
- OS grid reference: SE883216
  - London: 150 mi (240 km) S
- Civil parish: Alkborough and Walcot
- Unitary authority: North Lincolnshire
- Ceremonial county: Lincolnshire
- Region: Yorkshire and the Humber
- Country: England
- Sovereign state: United Kingdom
- Post town: Scunthorpe
- Postcode district: DN15
- Dialling code: 01724
- Police: Humberside
- Fire: Humberside
- Ambulance: East Midlands
- UK Parliament: Scunthorpe

Alkborough is a parish of 471 people in 192 households (2021 census) in North Lincolnshire, England, located near the northern end of The Cliff range of hills overlooking Trent Falls, the confluence of the River Trent and the River Ouse.

Alkborough, with the hamlet of Walcot about 1 mile (1.6 km) south, forms a civil parish which covers about 2,875 acres (12 km^{2}). The village was once thought to be the location that the Romans called Aquis, but that name is now usually associated with the town of Buxton in Derbyshire (Aquis Arnemetiae).

== Toponymy ==
The place-name Alkborough seems to contain an Old English personal name, Aluca or Alca, + berg (Old English), a hill, a mound; an artificial hill; a tumulus, so 'Alca's hill'. Cameron derived the place-name Walcot from "the cottage, hut or shelter of the Welshman" and suggested that the name might represent an isolated group of Welshmen, identifiable as such in Anglo-Saxon England.

Alkborough appears in the Domesday survey of 1086 as Alchebarge.

== History ==
=== Neolithic ===
The earliest evidence of settlement in the area has been found near Kell Well (a spring on the ridge to the south of Alkborough and the west of Walcot) in the form of a stone axe head, flint arrowheads and other finds thought to date from the Neolithic period (4000 BC–2351 BC).

=== Bronze Age ===
Artifacts including a beaker, dating from the early Bronze Age (2350 BC–1501 BC), were unearthed in 1920, in the grounds of Walcot Hall.

=== Iron Age ===
During the late Iron Age, Alkborough lay within the territory of the Corieltauvi tribe.

=== Roman ===
Following Roman invasion of the area, some time after AD43, the local Corieltauvi tribe became a Roman civitas. Pottery sherds dating from the 1st to the 4th century AD have been found in the fields south of Countess Close. These finds, along with a pot containing a small hoard of Roman coins, which was unearthed in the grounds of Walcot Hall, indicate the possibility of a Romano-British Settlement here. A geophysical survey taken in 2003 showed clear evidence of a Romano-British ladder settlement.

=== Medieval ===
The village is the site of the former Alkborough Benedictine Priory Cell. It was founded before 1052, when it is recorded as being given by its founder, Thorold, High Sheriff of Lincolnshire, to Spalding Priory. It was a small priory, being a cell of only three monks, a secular chaplain, and a prior. The cell was dependent on Spalding Priory from 1052 to 1074, then its staffing levels were reduced, until 1220, when it ceased to exist as a monastic house and was abandoned.

It was located at 53.683481°N 0.667179°W, which is in the south of the village in the grounds of College Farm. A Field Investigator's comment from 17 February 1964 states that there is no material evidence of antiquity.

Alkborough Priory Cell is included in the English Heritage Archive (Number: SE 82 SE 7, Monument Number: 61223).

=== Wartime ===
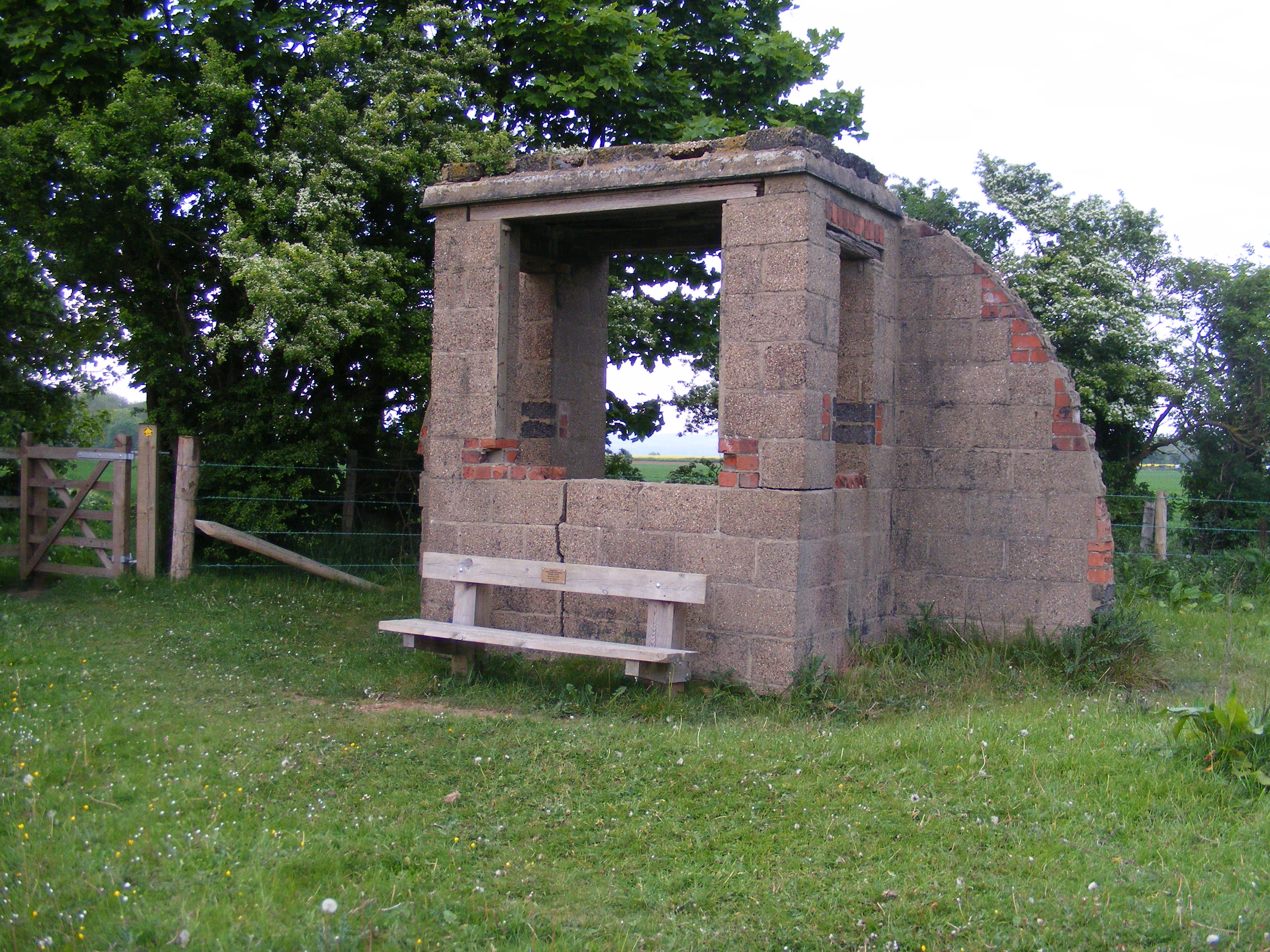
The remains of the northern bombing range observation post

==== Bombing range ====
Alkborough Flats was home to a bombing range during the Second World War. The following is a summary of an oral history provided by an Alkborough resident who was school age during Second World War:

The bombing range itself took the form of a chalk marker on Alkborough Flats, and two observation posts positioned on the ridge overlooking the target. An RAF detachment from RAF Elsham Wolds, including two sergeants, were billeted in the southern of the two observation posts. Bombers would take off from Elsham, and drop smoke bombs on the target. Following a bombing run, a bearing on the bomb's landing site was taken from each observation post, and the position of the site calculated using triangulation. During one bombing run, a horse was killed, and another bomb narrowly missed a group of children sledging. After the war, agricultural workers ploughing on the Flats regularly reported releasing smoke. During the establishment of the Alkborough Flats Tidal Defence Scheme in 2005/2006, a large quantity of World War II ordnance was removed from the site under supervision of bomb disposal officers. Currently, very little remains of the southern observation post, though an entire wall of the northern observation post is still standing (including the observation windows).

The southern observation post was located at 53.689761°N 0.662059°W, and the northern at 53.697792°N 0.655185°W. They are both accessible to the public via a public footpath. The location of the chalk target marker is not known exactly, but was somewhere to the west of the new bird hide, which is located at 53.695063°N 0.660376°W.

==== Defensive structures ====
A number of Second World War defensive structures were also in the Alkborough area, including:

- Three searchlight batteries. One of these (Site 3) was located just west of Whitton Road, at 53.689205°N 0.660562°W. It was staffed by 1 Troop of 323 Searchlight Battery from October 1941. It was established as part of a special deployment of searchlights to defend the Humber Estuary, complementing existing local searchlight batteries). A typical installation of this type comprised a small ring ditch (providing operators with some shelter during an air raid, a predictor emplacement (for calculating the height/range of aircraft), a light anti-aircraft machine gun pit, a generator and hutted accommodation for the crew. This site is included in the English Heritage Archive (Number: SE 82 SE 62, Monument Number: 1500984).
- A heavy anti-aircraft battery. It was located just south of West Halton Lane (near Southdale Farm), at 53.676506°N 0.650367°W, and was listed as 'unarmed' in 1942. This site is included in the English Heritage Archive (Number: SE 82 SE 60, Monument Number: 1473341).

== Governance ==
Lying within the historic county boundaries of Lincolnshire for centuries, from a very early time, Alkborough formed part of the Manley Wapentake in the North division of Lindsey. Care for the poor of the parish extends back prior to 1765, though after the Poor Law reforms of 1834, Alkborough became part of the Glanford Brigg Poor Law Union. From 1894 until 1974, Alkborough lay within Glanford Brigg Rural District.

=== Population history (1801–2001) ===
The population history of the area is reported as the following, transcribed from North Lincolnshire Council website.

Year	Population	Year	Population
1801	345	1901	420
1811	368	1911	418
1821	428	1921	432
1831	467	1931	397
1841	528	1941	N/A
1851	468	1951	448
1861	497	1961	470
1871	487	1971	468
1881	399	1981	482
1891	427	1991	454
		2001	455

=== Conservation Area ===
The older part of Alkborough, including Julian's Bower, Countess Close, and Walcot, lies within a Conservation Area.

== Geography ==
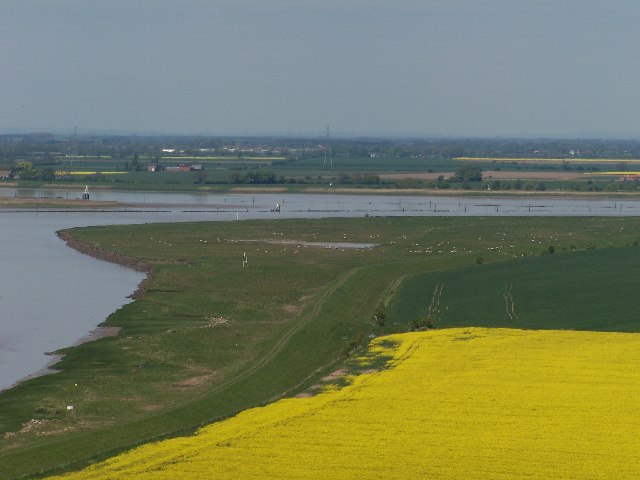
Alkborough Flats and the confluence of the Rivers Trent, Ouse and Humber

Alkborough is situated on an escarpment formed of Triassic Mudstone, known as The Cliff, which runs roughly north–south. The steep mudstone escarpment is to the west, with a shallow slope to the east formed from shale of the Lower Lias in the Jurassic system.

=== Alkborough Flats ===
Alkborough Flats is an area of low-lying arable farmland of nearly 990 acres (4 km^{2}) situated at the "Confluence of the Rivers" (Trent Falls) where the Rivers Trent and Ouse join to form the Humber Estuary. The alluvial plain is now jointly owned by the UK's Environment Agency and English Nature. Flood defences, which were built in the 1950s to protect the area, have been breached to allow water to reclaim the land at high tide and in times of flooding. The project created 495 acres (2 km^{2}) of new intertidal habitat in the inner part of the Humber Estuary. The new grassland will be managed to encourage biodiversity, with reedbeds, lagoons and grazing areas.

Alkborough Flats is the first coastal realignment site to be developed as part of the Humber Shoreline Management Plan. This "managed retreat" strategy should lessen the risks of flooding in low-lying towns along the Ouse and Trent by realigning existing flood defences to create compensatory intertidal habitat around the estuary. The relatively new island of Whitton Island in the Humber Estuary falls partly within the parish.

=== Walcot ===
Walcot is an outlying hamlet situated to the south of Alkborough, and within the same parish.

== Landmarks ==
=== Julian's Bower ===
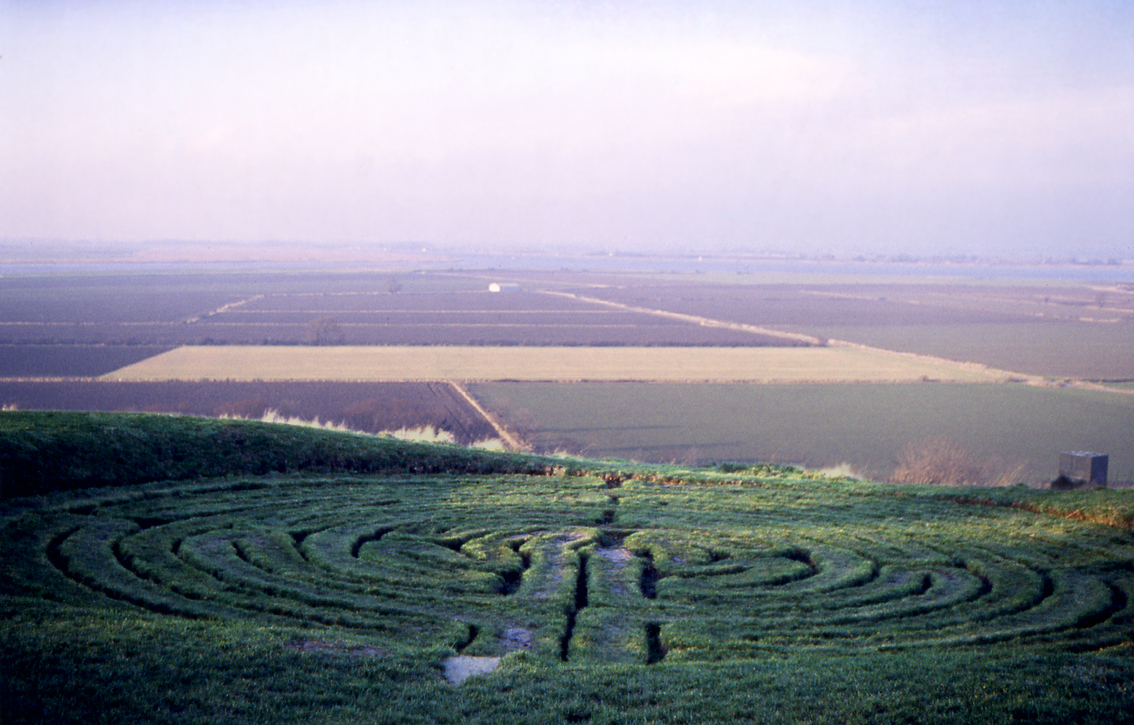
Julian's Bower turf maze overlooks Alkborough Flats and the confluence of the Rivers Trent, Ouse and Humber

Close to the Cliff edge is Julian's Bower, a unicursal turf maze, 43 feet (13 m) across, of indeterminate age. Although referred to as a maze, being unicursal (having only one way in and one path through) it is more accurately a labyrinth.

According to Arthur Mee's book Lincolnshire the maze was cut by monks in the 12th century, but White's Lincolnshire Directory of 1872 maintains that it was constructed in Roman times as part of a game. Others think that while the feature is of Roman origin, it was later used by the Medieval Church for some sort of penitential purpose and only reverted to its former use as an amusement or diversion, after the Reformation.

Firm documentary evidence of its existence only seems to date from 1697 however, when it was noticed, on his travels, by the Yorkshire antiquary Abraham de la Pryme.

In case the maze becomes overgrown or otherwise indistinct, its pattern is recorded, in a 19th-century stained glass church window, on the floor of the church porch and also on the gravestone of James Goulton Constable, which is in Alkborough cemetery.

Julian's Bower is a Scheduled Ancient Monument.

=== Countess Close ===
Countess Close (National Monument No. 32622; North Lincolnshire Sites and Monuments Record (NLSMR) No. 44) is a rectangular earthwork lying a few yards to the south of Julian's Bower. It measures approx. 80 m × 90 m internally.

It was recorded by the 18th century antiquary, William Stukeley on a visit to the area whilst researching his book Itinerarium Curiosum (or Observations From A Journey). He thought Countess Close to be a Roman Fort, as did the earlier Abraham de la Pryme. However, a 2003 archaeological project carried out by Humber Field Archaeology concluded that, despite evidence of a Romano-British ladder settlement running south along the ridge from Countess Close, it is probable that the earthwork is the remains of a medieval fortified manor house.

It is thought that Countess Close is named for a Saxon heiress called Countess Lucy of Leicester, Lincoln and Chester. She inherited the land from her husband Ivo Taillebois (who in the time of William the Conqueror was Lord of Holland), who was given the land by Peterborough Abbey. Following Lucy's death, Countess Close passed to her son, who then gave the land to Spalding Priory in 1147.

Countess Close is a Scheduled Ancient Monument.

=== St John the Baptist Church ===
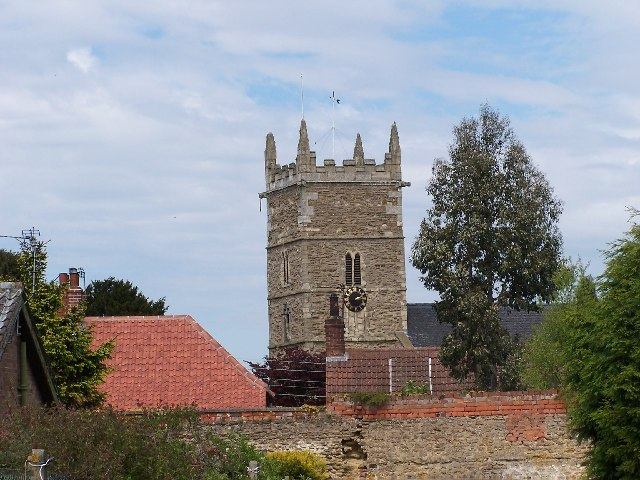
The Saxon tower of St John the Baptist Church, Alkborough

Earliest records show a church here in 1052, and the tower is of typical Saxon design. The architecture of the church shows there have been many changes to the building throughout its long history.

The font, although set on a modern base, dates back to Norman times.

The oak reredos behind the altar was made by the famous Robert (Mouseman) Thompson (also known as Mousey Thompson) of Kilburn. His signature mouse can be seen on the right hand upright. The reredos was placed in the church as a memorial in the early 1920s.

Under a capping stone set in the floor near the tower entrance, lies what is believed to be a stone of Romano-British origin.

For some years the church housed a pair of Grotrian-Steinweg grand pianos belonging to the Goldstone and Clemmow piano duo, and was used for many of their recordings.

==== Possible Thomas Becket connection ====
In 1697, Abraham de la Pryme reported the existence of a stone in the ruined chancel of the church, bearing the inscribed names of "Richardus Bruto Necnon Menonius Hugo, Willelmus Trajo templum hoc lapidus altum, Condebant patria gloria dignia Deo". The inscription is translated as "Richard Brito as well as Hugh Morville and William Tracy, built with stones this lofty temple, a worthy glory to God", suggesting that three of the four knights who murdered Thomas Becket in Canterbury Cathedral in 1170, (namely Sir Hugh de Morville, Lord of Westmorland, Sir William de Tracy and Sir Richard le Breton), took refuge in Alkborough and helped with restoration of the church. If any such stone ever existed, it cannot now be found.

=== Alkborough tower mill ===
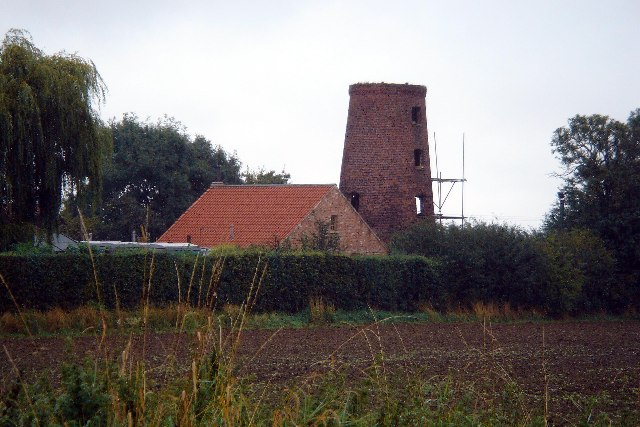
The tower mill in 2005

The tower mill at Alkborough was built circa 1860 of red brick and tar, originally for the milling of cereals. It replaced a post mill which was recorded as still standing in 1853. It remained in wind operation until 1916 (but continued with engine operation for a short while thereafter), and from 2009 became part of a private dwelling. The mill retains two millstones in situ on the first floor. The floors contain re-used timber from the post mill, and two posts are made from a common sail whip.

The tower mill is included in the English Heritage Archive (Number: SE 883,215, Monument Number: 497747). It is located just off West Halton Lane at 53.682821°N 0.664474°W.

=== Walcot Hall ===
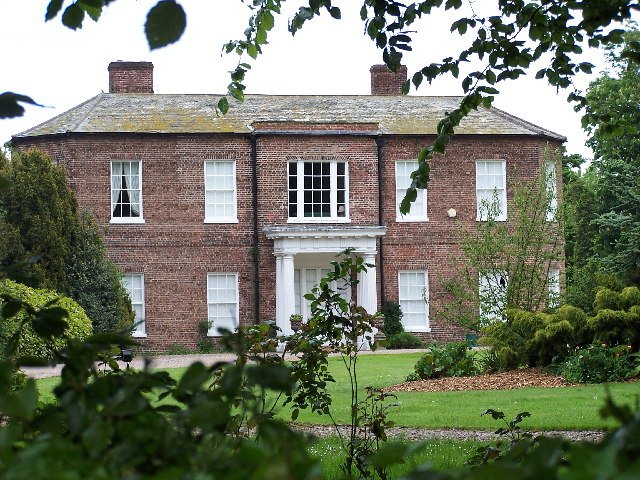
Walcot Hall

Walcot Hall is a Grade II listed Georgian country house which stands in 22 acres of parkland in the hamlet of Walcot some 1 mile (2 km) south of the village of Alkborough.

It was built in the mid to late 18th century for Thomas Goulton, modified in the early 1800s and partly demolished in 1964.

Several families have occupied the building, including the Marriotts, Stricklands, Constables and Legards. It was bought by the current owners in 2004.

It is currently used to cater for weddings and corporate events. It is located at 53.6789°N 0.6724°W.

=== Kell Well ===
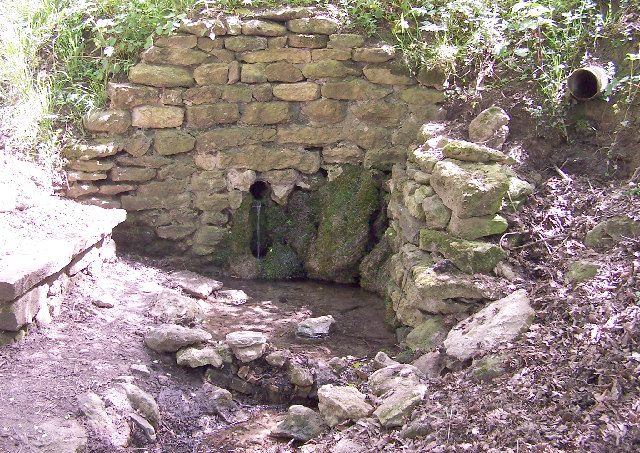
Kell Well

Kell Well is a spring that discharges from a point just below the top of The Cliff escarpment, west of Walcot. However, due to Danish influence the name is not uncommon for springs in eastern England, keld being a Danish word for spring pool. The waters of the spring were once believed to have had petrifying properties, but if this were ever the case those properties are now lost. However, the spring is chalybeate. Kell Well was first recorded by Abraham de la Pryme following his visit in 1697. He wrote "a great many pretty stones, being a kind of astroites or starr stones... The country people call them kestles and postles." The stones to which De la Pryme referred were the remnants of fossil crinoids. These were once common at Kell Well, though there have been no recorded finds for many years.

Kell Well is accessible to the public via a spur path from the nearby bridleway. It is located at 53.675810°N 0.679078°W.

=== Low Wells ===
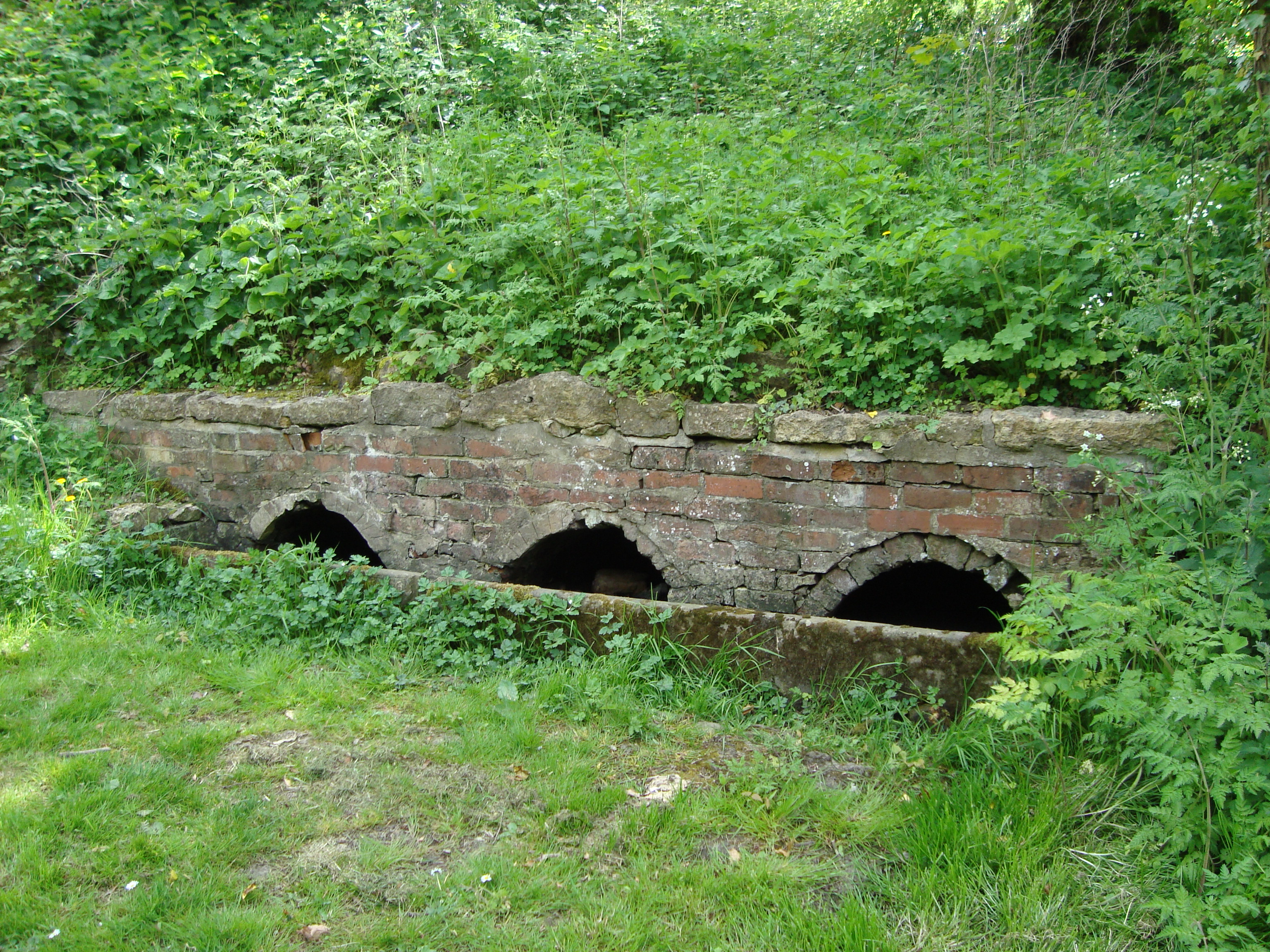
Low Wells

Low Wells is a spring that discharges from a point just the south side of Prospect Lane, north of (and several yards below) St John the Baptist Church. There is no evidence suggesting how the spring became known as "Low Wells", though its position below the level of the main part of the village would seem to suggest an obvious answer. The well takes the form of three low brick arches behind a long rectangular trough, into which the water flows. This well-structure is thought to have been constructed c. 1850. As this arrangement was probably to facilitate the watering of livestock, a pump was installed nearby to tap the springs first and provide clean drinking water for villagers, though this has now gone. The structure was restored in 1986.

Low Wells is accessible to the public from Prospect Lane, and is located at coordinates 53.686635°N 0.666337°W.

=== Apex Light ===
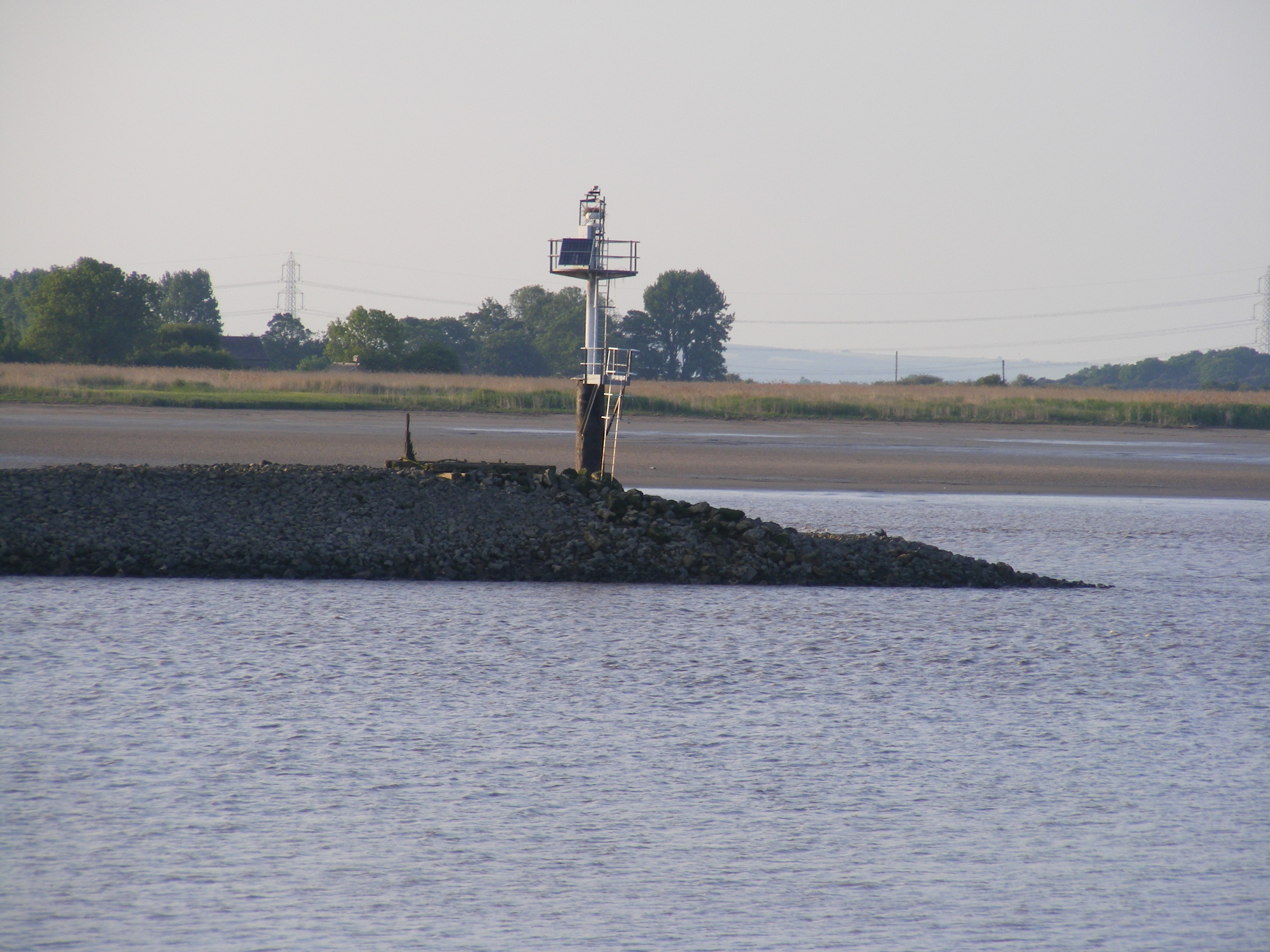
Apex Light at Trent Falls (photographed in 2010)

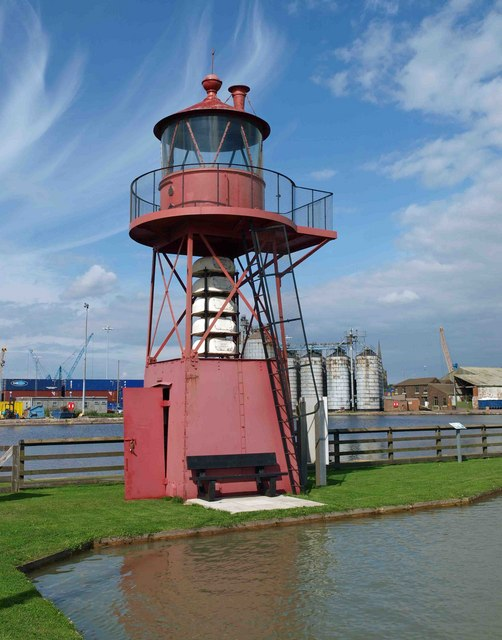
The old Apex Lighthouse is now on display at the Yorkshire Waterways Museum in Goole.

By a quirk of the Alkborough & Walcot parish boundary, the Trent Falls light known as Apex Light lies within the parish. This is despite its being 'attached' to the opposite bank of the River Trent, and inaccessible from Alkborough.
It is located at 53.700376°N 0.691336°W

== Image gallery ==
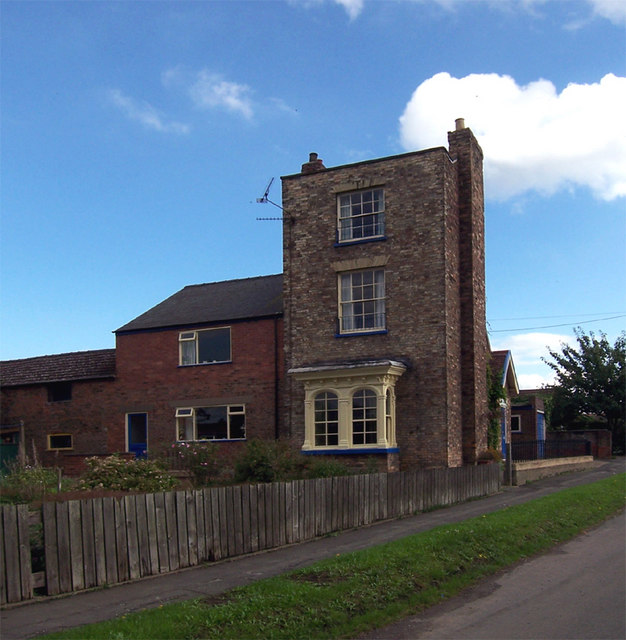
The three-storey 'Tower House' on Back Street

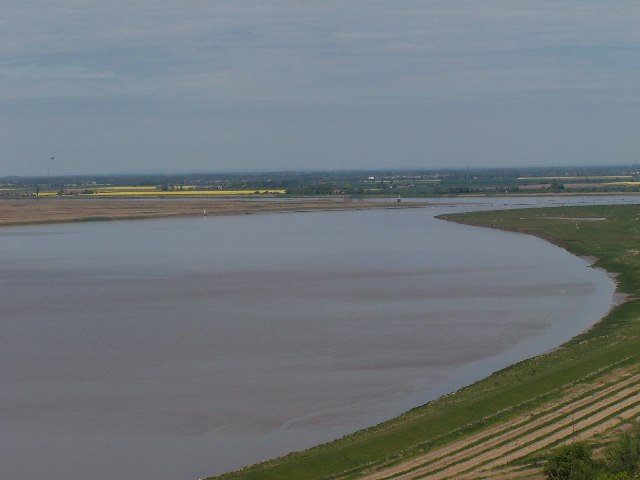
Trent Falls (the Confluence of Rivers Trent, Ouse and Humber)

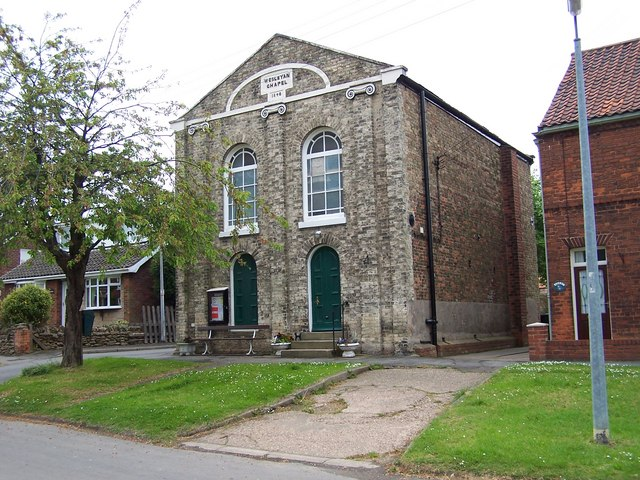
Alkborough Wesleyan Chapel
