= Ralph Louis Wain =

British chemist (1911–2000)

CBE FRS Ralph Louis Wain
- Born: Ralph Louis Wain; 11 May 1911; Hyde, Cheshire, England
- Died: 14 December 2000 (aged 89); Canterbury, England
- Education: Sheffield Hallam University
- Scientific career
- Fields: Chemistry
- Workplaces: Wye College

Ralph Louis Wain CBE FRS (29 May 1911 Hyde, Cheshire – 14 December 2000 Canterbury) was a British agricultural chemist.

He read Chemistry at the University of Sheffield on scholarship, and with first class honours degree, and a Master of Science and PhD. He was advised by G.M. Bennett.

He lectured in chemistry at the South Eastern Agricultural College at Wye, until 1939. During World War II, he conducted research at Long Ashton Research Station, at the University of Bristol. After the war, he was Head of the Chemistry Department and the Chair of Agricultural Chemistry at Wye College.

He was Honorary Director of the Unit on Plant Growth Substances and Selective Fungicides at Wye. He lectured at University of Kent at Canterbury where he was Honorary Professor in 1977.

He was married and had two children.

== Awards ==
- 1988 Mullard Medal, Royal Society
- 1977 Actonian Award of the Royal Institution of Great Britain
- 1960 Research Medal of the Royal Agricultural Society
- 1963 John Scott International Award

== Works ==
- "Chemotherapy for plant diseases", The New Scientist, January 7, 1960, Vol. 7, No. 164, ISSN 0262-4079
