= George Fownes =

British chemist

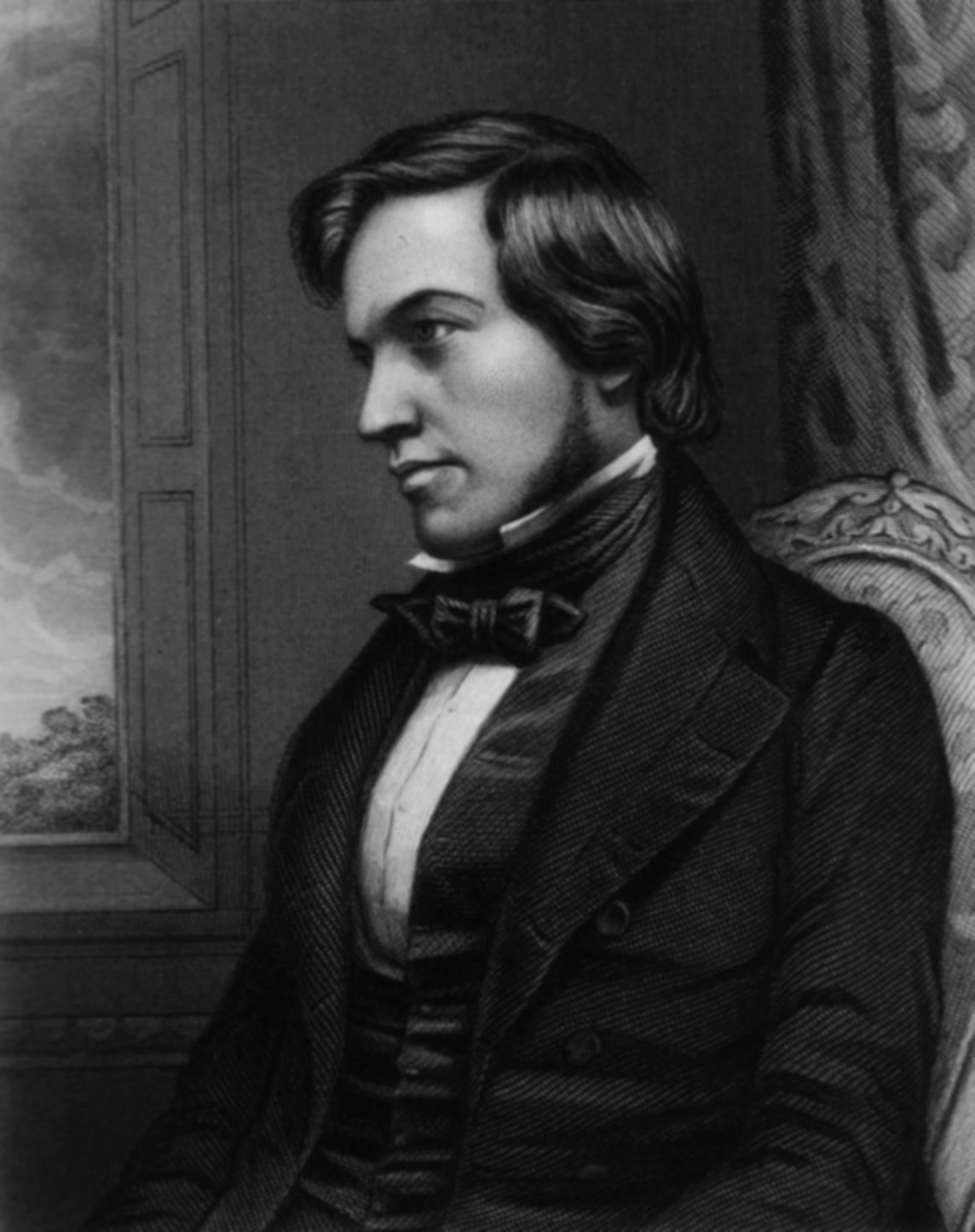
George Fownes

George Fownes, FRS (14 May 1815 in London – 31 January 1849) was a British chemist.

He attended the Palace School in Enfield. He obtained his PhD at Giessen, in Germany. From 1842 he was chemistry professor at the Pharmaceutical Society of Great Britain, and from 1846 at University College, London. He was also secretary of the Chemical Society of London.

In 1844, he published a chemistry textbook. In 1842, he had been awarded the Royal Agricultural Society's prize for his essay Food of Plants. In 1844, he received the first Actonian Prize (of 100 guineas) for his essay Chemistry as Exemplifies the Wisdom and Beneficence of God. This work was compared to the Bridgewater Treatises and Fownes was referred to as "a thorough chemist, a sound philosopher, and an enlightened Christian."

He was elected a fellow of the Royal Society in 1845, but that same year resigned from his academic positions due to ill health. For his researches in organic chemistry, he was awarded the Royal Society's Royal Medal in 1847. He spent time in Barbados from 1847, in an attempt to treat the pulmonary disease afflicting him, but, on his return to England in 1848, he caught a cold and died at his father's house in Brompton at the age of 34.

== Papers ==
- “On the Direct Formation of Cyanogen from its Elements,” Rep. Brit. Assoc., 1841, part ii. pp. 52, 53
- “On the Preparation of Artificial Yeast,” Mem. Chem. Soc., i., 1841–43, pp. 100–103
- “On the Preparation of Hippuric Acid,” Phil. Mag., xxi., 1842, pp. 382–384
- “On the Food of Plants” [prize essay], Jour. Agric. Soc., iv., 1843, pp. 498–556
- “On the Existence of Phosphoric Acid in Rocks of Igneous Origin,” Phil. Trans., 1844, pp. 53–56
- “An Account of the Artificial Formation of a Vegeto-alkali” (Furfurol), and “On Benzoline,” Phil. Trans., 1845, pp. 253–268
- “On the Production of Furfurol,” Pharm. Journ., 1849, 113–116
- “On the Equivalent or Combining Volumes of Solid Bodies,” Pharm. Journ., pp. 334–339.

== Sources ==
- "Fownes, George" . Dictionary of National Biography. London: Smith, Elder & Co. 1885–1900.
- Baynes, T. S., ed. (1879). "Fownes, George" . Encyclopædia Britannica. Vol. 9 (9th ed.). New York: Charles Scribner's Sons.
- Entry for Fownes in the Royal Society's Library and Archive catalogue's details of Fellows (accessed 21 April 2008)
