= Spalding Priory =

Small Benedictine house in Spalding, Lincolnshire

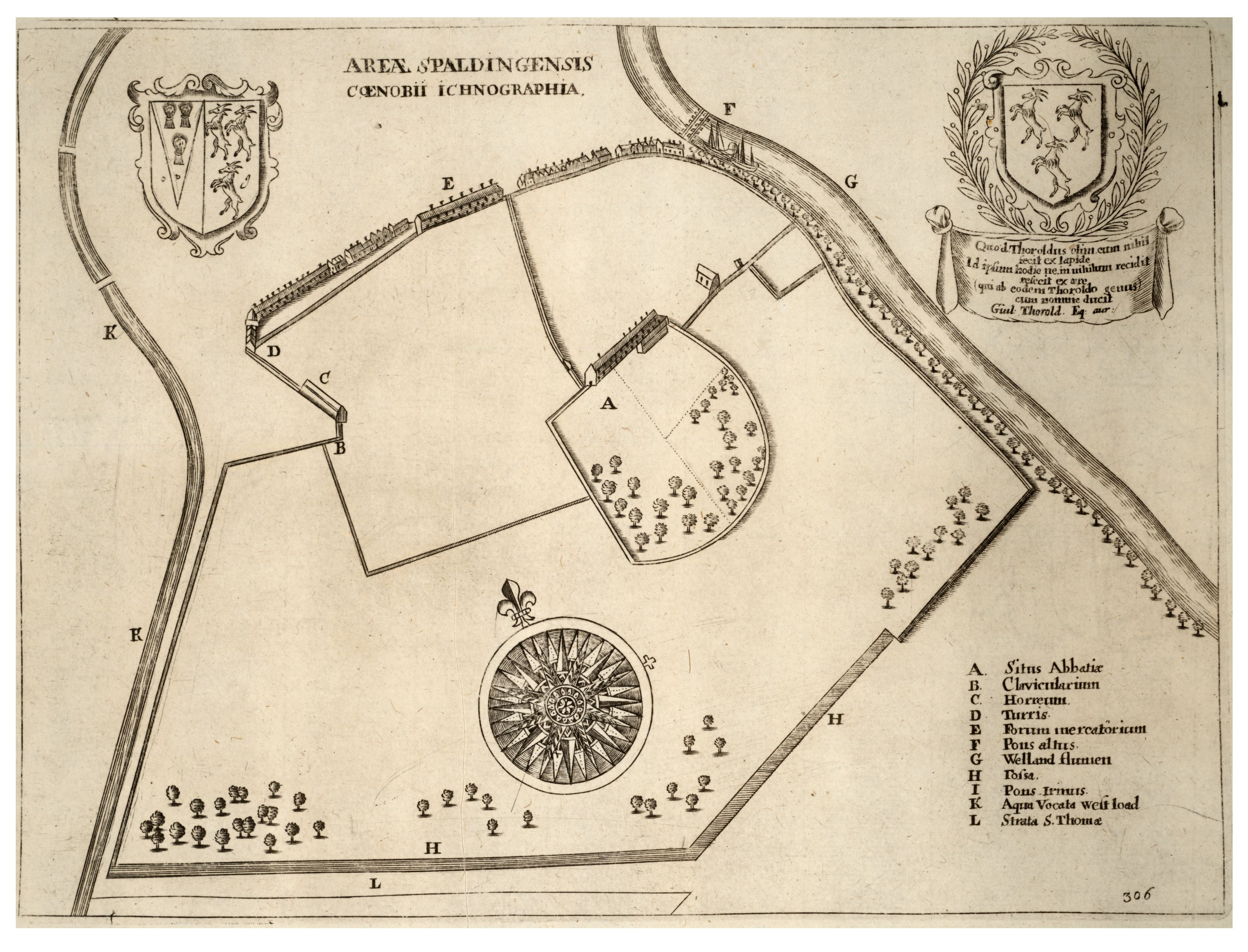
The priory precinct in a 17th-century engraving by Wenceslas Hollar

Spalding Priory was a small Benedictine house in the town of Spalding, Lincolnshire, dedicated to St Mary the Virgin and St Nicholas.

It was founded as a cell of Croyland Abbey, in 1052, by Leofric, Earl of Mercia and his wife, Godiva, Countess of Leicester. It was supported by Leofric's eldest son. Ælfgār, Earl of Mercia and the monks were confirmed in their property in 1074, after the Norman Conquest of England.

Until 1220, Alkborough Priory Cell was a dependency of Spalding.

After 1071 one monk only remained in Spalding, so the house was refounded in 1074 as a dependent priory of St Nicholas's Abbey, Angers. The monks secured their independence from Angers in 1397, and remained so until 1540, when the house was surrendered at the dissolution. Six human skeletons found during building work in Bridge Street are presumed to indicate the site of the Priory burial ground.

The lands of the house passed to the family of Sir Richard Ogle of Pinchbeck, and were included in the English jointure of Anne of Denmark in 1603.

== Priors ==
Its priors included

- Simon 1229–1252
- James 1252–1253
- John 1253–1274
- At some time before 1278, there was a Wazinus.
- William of Littleport 1278–1293
- Clement 1293–1318
- Walter de Halton 1318–1322 though he is reported as holding the post for 14 years.
- Thomas de Nassington 1322–1353

== Burials ==
- Thomas Moulton (knight) and his father Lambert de Multon
- Thomas de Moulton, father of Thomas de Multon, 1st Baron Multon of Gilsland
- Lucy Mercia Tailebois, wife of Ivo Taillebois

== See also ==
- Monks Kirby Priory, in Monks Kirby, Warwickshire, also as an English Benedictine house subsidiary to St Nicholas at Angers, established in the wake of the Norman Conquest
- Adalbert of Spalding, supposed author
