= Wesley P. Dahlberg =

American car designer (1917–2023)

Wesley Paul Dahlberg (September 24, 1917 – November 1, 2023) was an American car designer. He is best known for designing the Ford Taunus P3 17M, the Badewanne.

== Biography ==
Wesley Paul Dahlberg was the son of Swedish immigrants, emigrating to the United States from Medelpad in northern Sweden. He became a car designer for the Ford Motor Company in Detroit. In the late 1950s, Ford sent him to West Germany to lead the build-up of Ford's new European design studio in Cologne. Along with the studio's executive chief Uwe Bahnsen, Dahlberg played a major part in the design of the famed Taunus 17m (project "Adria", series P3), produced from 1960 to 1964. Dahlberg continued working with Ford's operations in Europe for about a decade before returning to Detroit. His first assignment back in Detroit was to design the new Lincoln Continental series, which launched in the late 1960s. Dahlberg retired in 1973 to devote his time to artistic pursuits. He died in Claremont, California on November 1, 2023, at the age of 106.
