= William Acton =

William Acton may refer to:

== Politicians ==
- William Acton (senior), English MP
- William Acton (junior), English MP
- William Acton (MP for Orford) (c. 1684–1744), English MP
- William Acton (MP for Bridgnorth) (1513–1567), English MP
- William Acton (Wicklow MP) (1789–1854), MP for Wicklow 1841–48
- William M. Acton (1876–1957), American lawyer and politician

== Others ==
- William Acton (doctor) (1813–1875), British doctor and writer
- Sir William Acton, 1st Baronet (1570–1651), English merchant and Royalist
- William Acton, warden of the Marshalsea prison, London, in the 1720s, see trial of William Acton
- Will Acton (William Acton, born 1987), Canadian ice hockey player
- William Acton (painter) (1906–1945), Anglo-Italian painter
