= Erik Dahlberg Secondary School =

Coordinates: 57.7794°N 14.1906°E

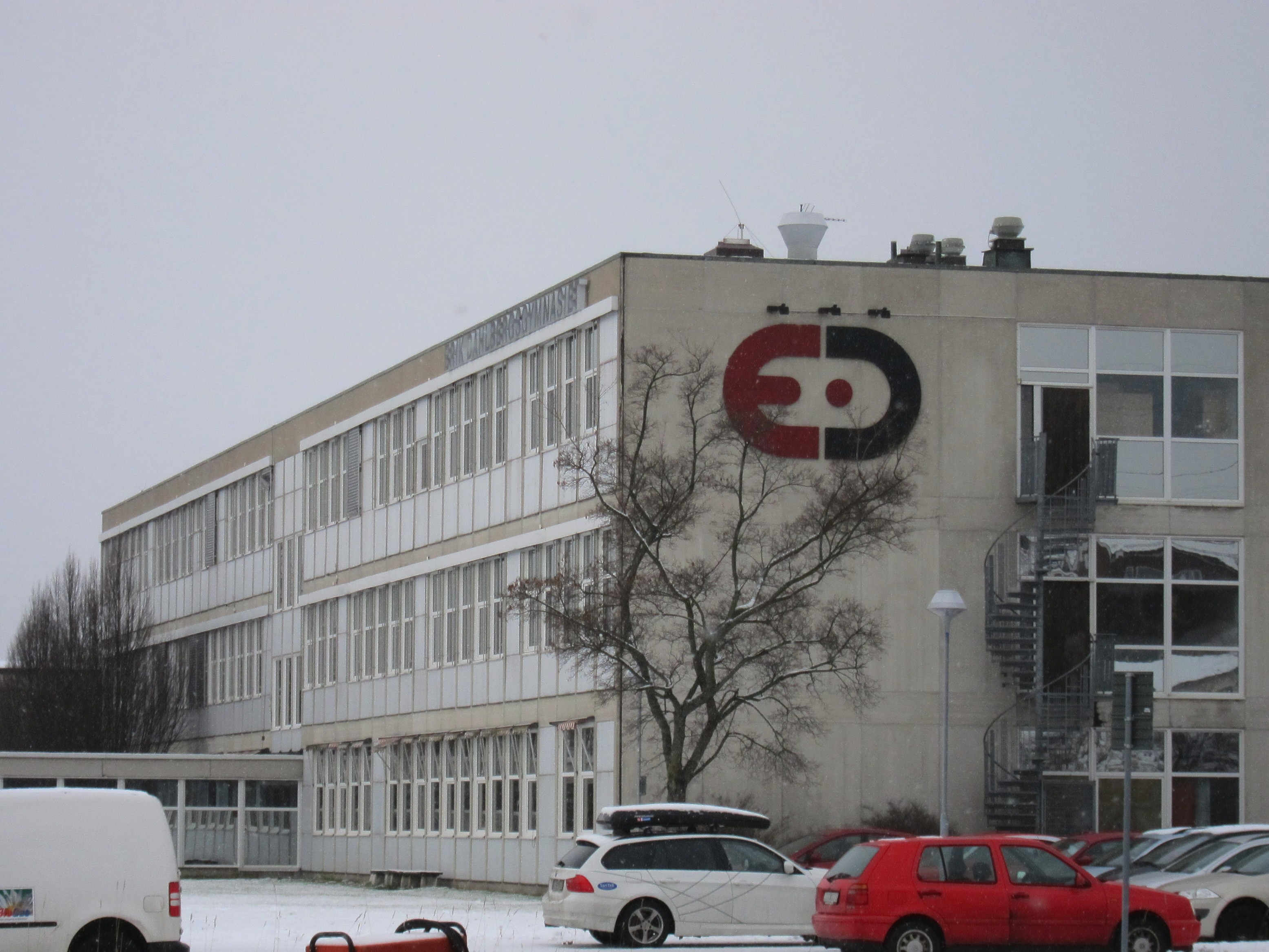
- The Erik Dahlberg Secondary School in January 2015
- Jönköping; Sweden

Information
- Type: secondary school
- Opened: 1949

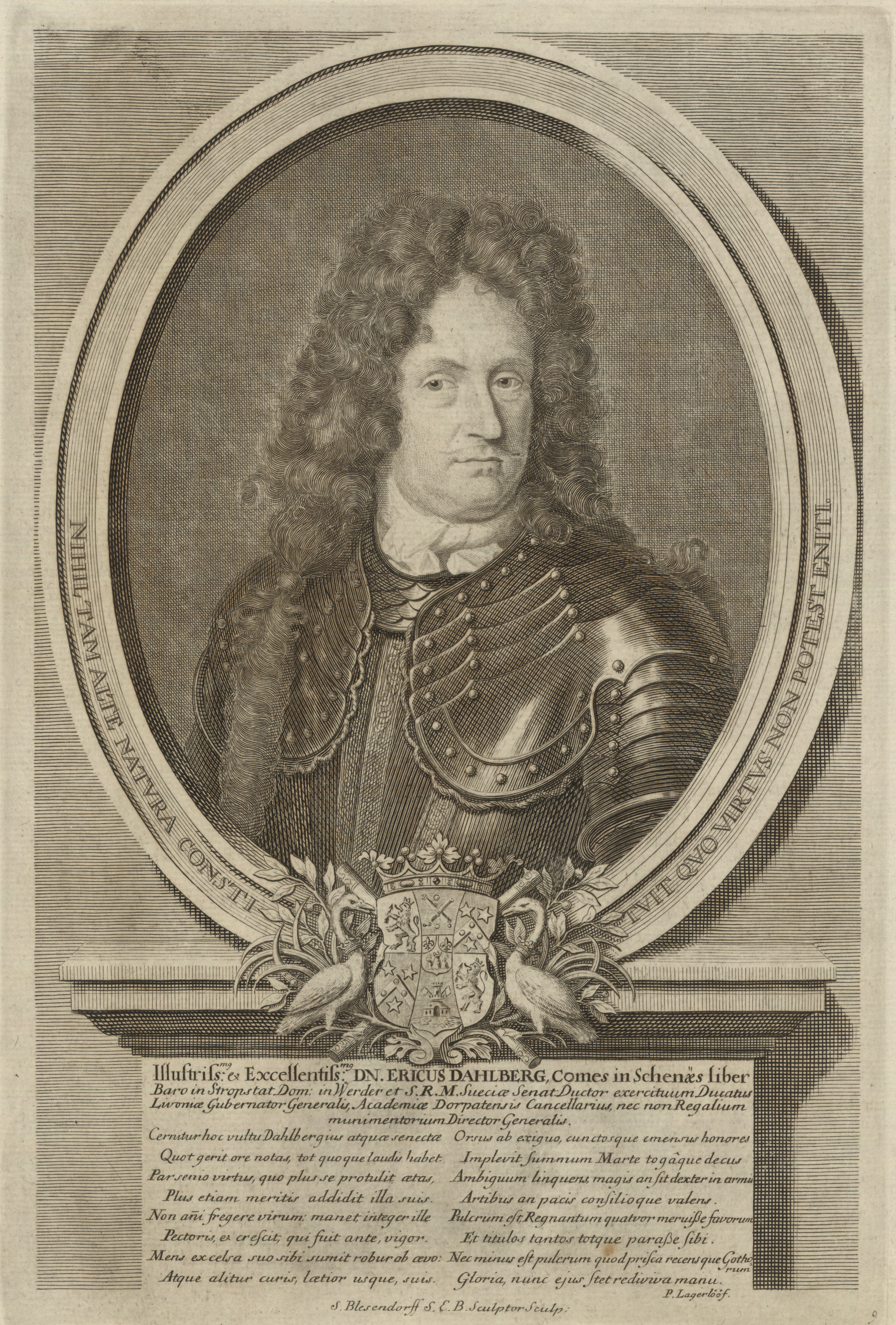
The school was named after Erik Dahlbergh

The Erik Dahlberg Secondary School (Swedish: Erik Dahlbergsgymnasiet) is a secondary school in Jönköping, Sweden. For many years the school focused in technical education. It was opened in 1949 as the Jönköping Technical Secondary School (Swedish: Jönköpings tekniska gymnasium). The current name was adopted from the 1966–67 school year, and the current buildings were completed, step by step, between 1961 and 1994.
