= Dahlberg Borer Newcomer syndrome =

- Other names: Lymphedema hypoparathyroidism syndrome, Hypoparathyroidism lymphedema syndrome, Dahlberg syndrome.

Dahlberg Borer Newcomer syndrome is a rare autosomal X-linked recessive genetic condition characterized by a prolapse of the bicuspid valve, progressive kidney failure, congenital lymphedema, hypoparathyroidism, and very short end bones of the fingers.

== Treatments ==
Treatment for this condition is based on its symptoms. These treatments may include manual lymphatic drainage, consumption of beta blockers or anticoagulants for the bicuspid valve prolapse and vitamin D or calcium carbonate tablets for the hypoparathyroidism.
