= John Lyon-Dalberg-Acton =

John Lyon-Dalberg-Acton may refer to:

- John Lyon-Dalberg-Acton, 3rd Baron Acton, CMG, MBE, TD, DL (1907–1989), British Peer
- John Lyon-Dalberg-Acton, 5th Baron Acton, (born 1966), author and farmer
