= Trent Falls =

Watercourse in the East Riding of Yorkshire, England

- River confluence
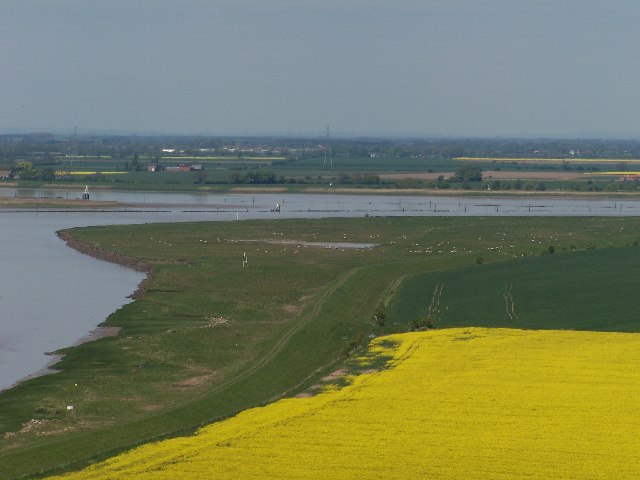
- Alkborough Flats and Trent Falls

- Location in Lincolnshire
- Coordinates: 53.700467°N 0.691109°W
- Grid position: SE86162310
- Location: Lincolnshire, England

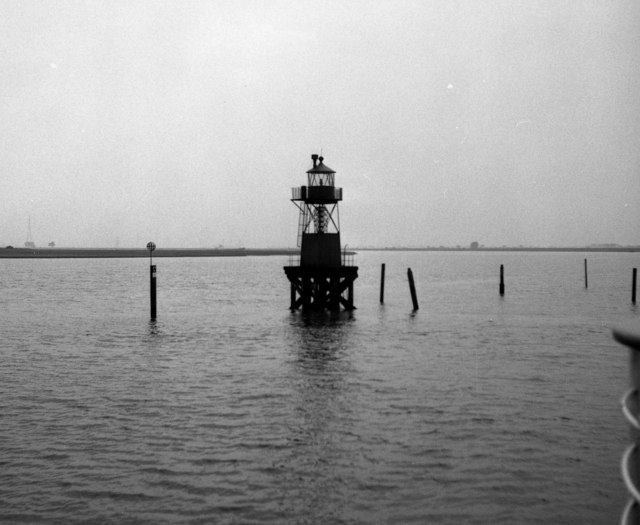
Apex Light as it appeared in 1974

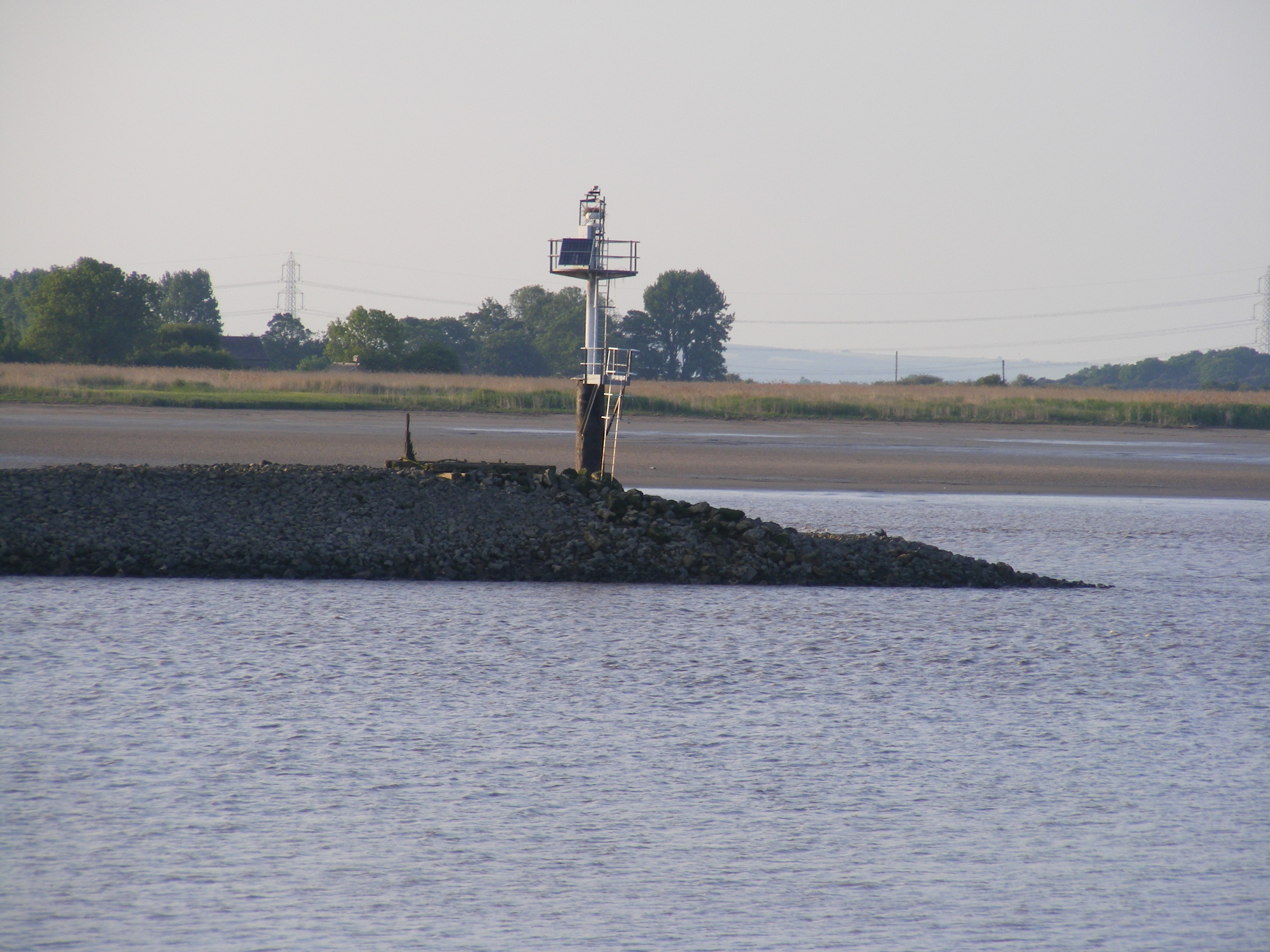
The more modern installation (taken in 2010)

Trent Falls is the confluence of the River Ouse and the River Trent which forms the Humber between Lincolnshire and the East Riding of Yorkshire in England.

== Location ==
The River Ouse flows to the east where it turns into the Humber, and the River Trent flows northwards. It curves to the east near the confluence, although this is largely engineered, rather than natural. A training wall was built on the western bank of the Trent after the First World War, in an attempt to keep the channel in a known position. The rivers deposit large volumes of silt in this area, and charts for coastal shipping have to be updated monthly, but for smaller vessels, the channel can be considered to be reasonably static.

Despite the training wall and a mini-lighthouse called 'Apex Light' which is situated at the end of the wall, navigation at Trent Falls is not simple. There are no real waterfalls, but there is a very rapid race of water at difficult stages of the tide (especially spring tides), and there is a tidal bore on the Trent (the Trent Aegir). Boats coming down one river with an ebbing tide often have to wait several hours (sometimes beached on the sand, and sometimes overnight) until the tide turns and the flood can carry them up the other river.

The RSPB's Blacktoft Sands nature reserve lies immediately upstream of the Falls, on the south bank of the Ouse. It is formed from the largest tidal reedbed in England, and is visited by 270 species of birds, including breeding pairs of bearded tits, Eurasian bitterns and marsh harriers, for which it is of national importance. Overlooking Trent Falls from a hill a mile away to the east is Julian's Bower, an ancient turf maze on the edge of the Lincolnshire village of Alkborough. It dates from at least 1697, when Abraham de la Pryme recorded it, although the reasons for its creation are now uncertain.

== Bibliography ==
- Nicholson (2006). Nicholson Guides Vol 6: Nottingham, York and the North East. Harper Collins. ISBN 978-0-00-721114-2.

=== References ===
Media related to Trent Falls at Wikimedia Commons
