= Edward Acton (judge) =

English barrister and judge

Acton in 1930.

Sir Edward Acton (6 November 1865 – 17 November 1945) was an English barrister and judge. He had the distinction of being the first County Court judge to be appointed to the High Court of Justice.

== Biography ==
=== Early life and legal career ===
Edward Acton was born in Manchester, the son of Henry Morell Acton and of Anne Shaw, née Williamson. His father was an editor of the Manchester Guardian, and the son of the Unitarian minister Henry Acton. He educated at Uppingham School, where he was an exhibitioner, and Wadham College, Oxford, where he was a classical scholar and the Hody Greek exhibitioner. Acton took a first in classical moderations in 1886 and a second in literae humaniores in 1888, then joined the Inner Temple as a foundation scholar in 1890. He was called to the bar in 1891 and later became a bencher of the Inner Temple.

He joined the Northern Circuit and practiced mainly in Manchester and Liverpool, building up a large practice. He additional became a lecturer in the law of evidence and procedure at the University of Manchester.

=== Judicial career ===
Acton had been expected to take silk, but surprised his friends in 1918 by accepting appointment as a County Court judge. Few County Court judges were ever promoted, and none had ever been promoted to the High Court, and was assigned to circuit 18 at Nottingham. In 1920, the High Court received two additional judgeships to deal with arrears in the King's Bench Division. Lord Birkenhead, a former member of the Northern Circuit, selected Acton for one of the vacancies. Acton was duly appointed and received the customary knighthood. This was the first time a County Court judge had been elevated to the High Court bench, and the appointment was generally welcomed, though it was noted that Acton and Birkenhead had both attended Wadham College and been members of the same circuit.

Assessments of his tenure differ. W. O. Hart in the Oxford Dictionary of National Biography writes that Acton's appointment was successful and that he was well-regarded as a judge. Henry Cecil, however, said that he was "a very poor lawyer" who made so many mistakes of law that successive lord chancellors were dissuaded from promoting further County Court judges; Patrick Polden thought the latter assertion questionable. Whatever the reason, the next appointment from the County Court, of Judge Austin Jones, did not occur until 1945.

Acton left few well-known judgments: he was said to prefer to decide cases based on the facts, without undue elaboration of the law. Of note was his judgment in Flint v Lovell [1935] 1 KB 354, in which he awarded damages for loss of life expectancy; the judgment was upheld on appeal.

He resigned from the High Court in 1934 on grounds of ill-health, and retired to Surrey, where he died in 1945.

Acton married Edith Nina Tulloch, daughter of Conrad William Alexander Tulloch, in 1903; they had no children.
