= Dalberg (disambiguation) =

Dalberg is a German noble family.

Dalberg may also refer to:

- Dalberg, Rhineland-Palatinate, a municipality in Germany
- Adolphus von Dalberg, a Prince-abbot of Fulda and founder of the Fulda university

== See also ==
- Dahlberg (disambiguation)
- Dalbergia, a genus of trees, shrubs and lianas
