= Yorkshire Waterways Museum =

Museum in Goole, East Riding of Yorkshire, England

Coordinates: 53.6947°N 0.8882°W

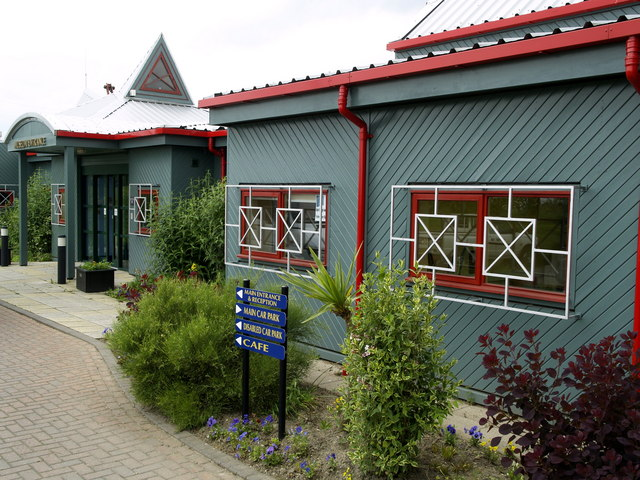
Yorkshire Waterways Museum

The Yorkshire Waterways Museum was a museum in Goole, East Riding of Yorkshire, England.

Its mission was to 'Use the heritage, arts and environment of the Yorkshire waterways as a resource for learning and regeneration'. The museum also hosted a Tom Pudding hoist which is grade II listed. This allowed little tub boats carrying coal from South Yorkshire to be unloaded at Goole Docks and put into ocean-going vessels.

== Liquidation ==
In early May 2019 it was announced that, as a consequence of ongoing funding shortfalls, the museum and its associated charity, The Sobriety Project, were insolvent and that the museum would close on 15 May.
