= Samuel Acton =

English architect, surveyor and artist

Samuel Acton (c. 1773 – January 1837) was an English architect, surveyor and artist.

== Life ==
Acton was the nephew and pupil of Nathaniel Wright, a London carpenter and surveyor. He entered the Royal Academy Schools in 1790, and studied there for at least four years, receiving the silver medal in 1794. He exhibited at the Academy from 1791 to 1802. His address is given in the catalogues as Hatton Garden throughout this period: "at Mr Wright's" in 1791, at number 75 from 1792, and number 78 in 1802. His exhibits included a drawing of the interior of St Botolph's church (1791), and designs for mansions, villas and baths.

Little is known of his professional career, except that he held the post of Surveyor to the Commissioners of Sewers for the City of London, and that in 1822 he was President of the Surveyors Club. At his death in January 1837, he was living at Chalfont St. Peter, Buckinghamshire. Among his bequests he left £500 to establish a charitable fund for the benefit of members of the Surveyors Club and their dependents. In 1838, his widow Hannah Acton gave £1000 in his memory to the Royal Institution to found the Actonian Prize.

== Sources ==
- Sir H.M. Colvin, A biographical dictionary of British architects, 1600-1840, 1995, p. 48
