= Dalberg, Rhineland-Palatinate =

Dalberg
- Municipality
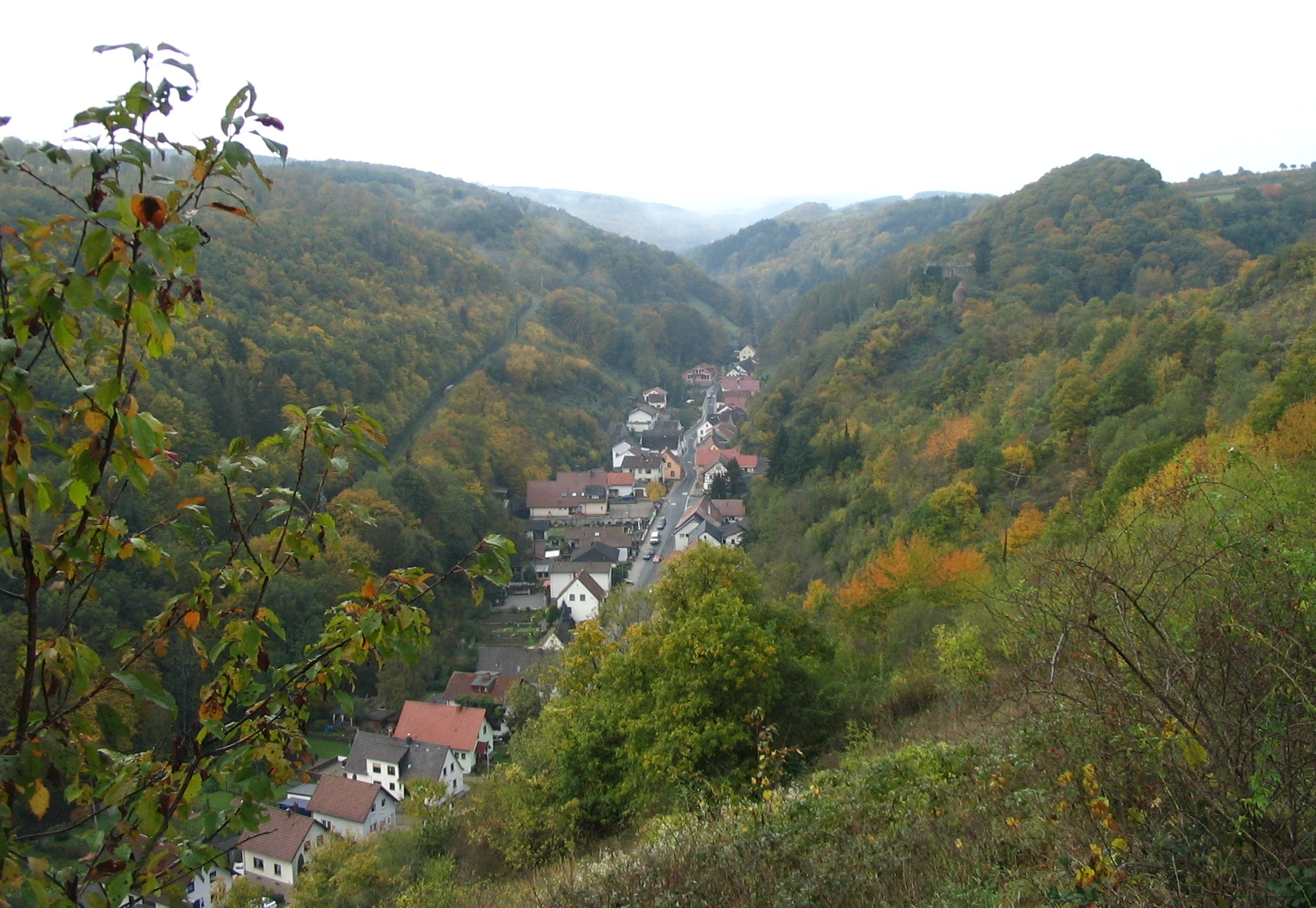
- Dalberg in its dale, showing its unusual location

- Coat of arms

- Location of Dalberg within Bad Kreuznach district
- Interactive map of Dalberg
- Location within Germany Location within Rhineland-Palatinate
- Coordinates: 49°53′45″N 7°43′57″E
- Country: Germany
- State: Rhineland-Palatinate
- District: Bad Kreuznach
- Municipal assoc.: Rüdesheim

Government
  - Mayor (2019–24): Dirk Ballhorn

Area
  - Total: 2.30 km^{2} (0.89 sq mi)
- Elevation: 230 m (750 ft)

Population (2025-12-31)
  - Total: 224
  - Density: 97.4/km^{2} (252/sq mi)
- Time zone: UTC+01:00 (CET)
  - Summer (DST): UTC+02:00 (CEST)
- Postal codes: 55595
- Dialling codes: 06706
- Vehicle registration: KH

Dalberg is an Ortsgemeinde – a municipality belonging to a Verbandsgemeinde, a kind of collective municipality – in the Bad Kreuznach district in Rhineland-Palatinate, Germany. It belongs to the Verbandsgemeinde of Rüdesheim, whose seat is in the municipality of Rüdesheim an der Nahe.

== Geography ==
=== Location ===
Dalberg lies in the Gräfenbach valley in the Hunsrück and has a population of about 250, who are mainly Catholic, and who live mainly along the Gräfenbach and the Mehlbach, two of the village's three streets.

=== Neighbouring municipalities ===
Clockwise from the north, Dalberg's neighbours are the municipalities of Wallhausen, Argenschwang and Spabrücken.

== History ==
The village of Dalberg arose in the Gräfenbach valley at the like-named castle at a rather arbitrarily chosen spot that was rather ill-suited for agriculture. Part of the village's history is inextricably bound with the Lords of Dalberg. Castle Dalberg was built sometime about 1150 to 1170. Because of the noble family's association with the village and the castle, the name "Dalberg" is well known in German history. The family Dalberg has brought forth many important politicians, scientists and bishops. Their name is drawn from the castle, which is also known as the Dalburg (Berg and Burg, both common placename endings in Germany – as well as standalone words in German – have different pronunciations and meanings: the former is [bɛʁk], meaning "mountain", and the latter [bʊʁk], meaning "castle"). Even now that it is a ruin, this once mighty building still bears witness to its former owners' might and influence. It was at the foot of the castle that the village of Dalberg sprang up.

== Religion ==
Besides the castle and the old village bakehouse, the chapel is among the village's most historically important buildings. The bells there are still rung by hand. Dalbergers are mostly Catholic and have kept the traditions of the liturgical year. As at 31 August 2013, there are 257 full-time residents in Dalberg, and of those, 49 are Evangelical (19.066%), 171 are Catholic (66.537%), 3 (1.167%) belong to other religious groups and 34 (13.23%) either have no religion or will not reveal their religious affiliation.

== Politics ==
=== Municipal council ===
The council is made up of 6 council members, who were elected by majority vote at the municipal election held on 7 June 2009, and the honorary mayor as chairman.

=== Mayor ===
Dalberg's mayor is Dirk Ballhorn.

=== Coat of arms ===
The municipality's arms might be described thus: Azure a fess Or between three fleurs-de-lis of the same and charged with a cross moline sable.

== Culture and sightseeing ==
=== Buildings ===
The following are listed buildings or sites in Rhineland-Palatinate's Directory of Cultural Monuments:

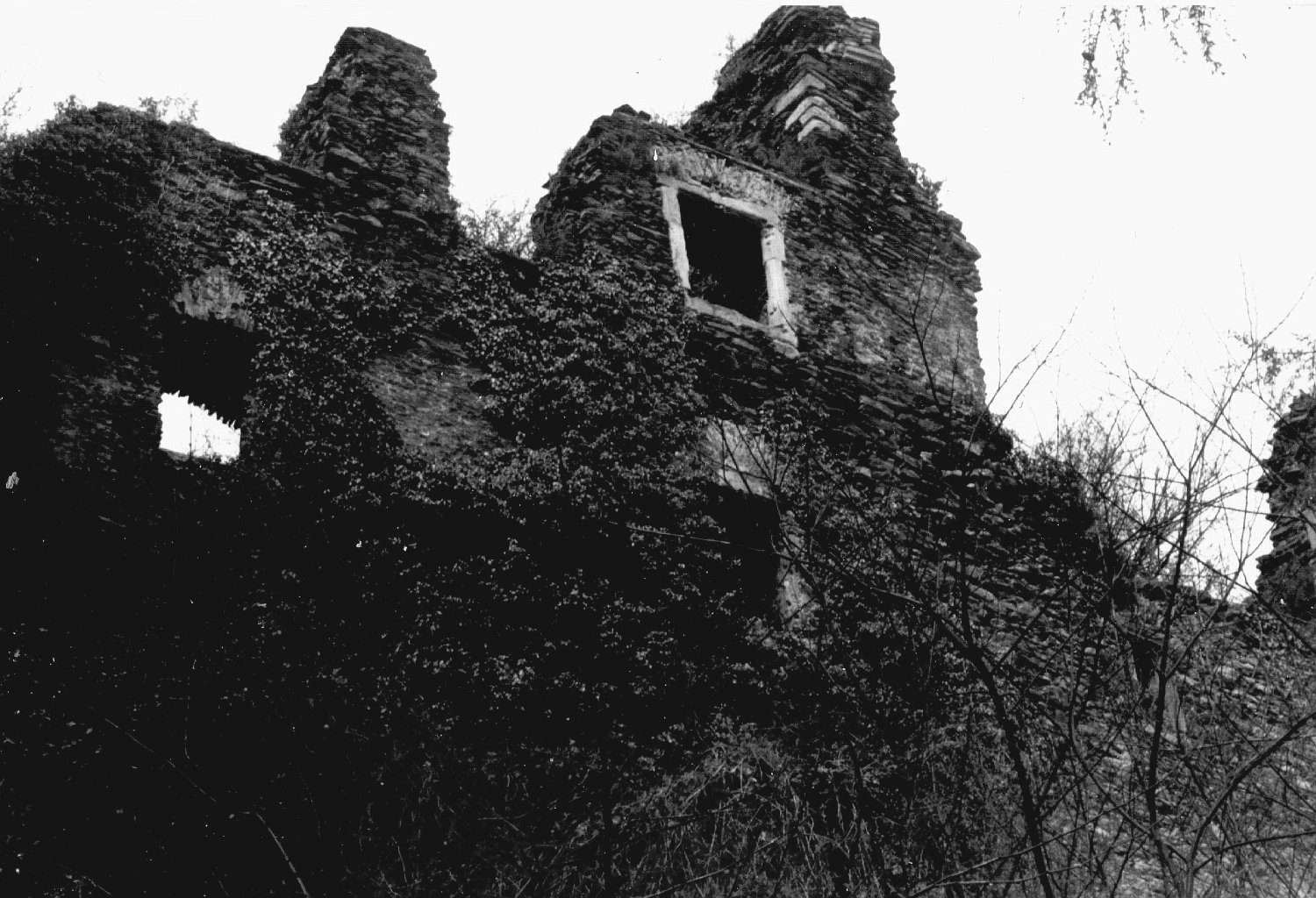
Dalberg castle ruin

- Saint Leonard's Catholic Church (Kirche St. Leonhard), Gräfenbachstraße 2 – Late Gothic aisleless church, marked 1485, Baroque western extension, marked 1785; on the church a Crucifix, 19th century (see also below)
- Gräfenbachstraße 24 – complex with single roof ridge, partly timber-frame, mid 18th century, commercial building; corner complex important to municipal building work
- Between Gräfenbachstraße 41 and 43 – bridge across the Gräfenbach, one-arch bridge, quarrystone, 18th or 19th century
- Gräfenbachstraße 41 – former municipal hall and bakehouse, marked 1849
- Dalberg castle ruin – preserved from the complex founded about 1150 and destroyed in parts in 1635 or 1689: Romanesque keep, residential quarters, dwelling building, "Long Hall", 14th century, former Saint Anthony's Chapel (Antoniuskapelle) with corner tower, "Dietherbau" with "Dietherturm" (tower), before 1371 and before 1398; two columns of a waterpipe.
- Madonna column, on the way to the castle ruin – Baroque, marked 1728

=== Saint Leonard's Chapel ===
The more than 500-year-old chapel, St.-Leonhard-Kapelle, is consecrated to Saint Leonard. By 1485, the village below the castle had grown so greatly that it seemed quite fitting for it to have its own chapel. Shortly before this time, on 24 April 1483, the church at Spabrücken, given what a long way it was to Wallhausen, was granted leave by the Church to put up a baptismal font, thus making a decisive stride towards a kind of parochial autonomy. It might also have strengthened the Dalberg dwellers' wish to have their own church. The master builders in charge of the project might well have been Philipp I (1428-1492) and Friedrich (1459-1506) of Dalberg, who also appear in historical records as the caretakers of the churches in Spabrücken and Wallhausen. The noble pastor of Wallhausen was Friedrich's brother Johann (1455-1503), who as of 1482 was also the Prince-Bishop of Worms. Generally held to be the one who actually built the chapel in the dale is Prince-Bishop Johann. His coat of arms graces a console inside the chapel. The year 1485 in an inscription over the chapel's east window may confirm the building date. Dating from the same time are the wall paintings, among them one of Saint Leonard himself, surrounded by prisoners (of whom he is patron saint). In this region, it was rather unusual for a church or chapel to be consecrated to this saint. What decided this might well have been a certain fashion, but rather likelier was a longstanding reverence that the family of chamberlains, for Gerhard, Chamberlain of Worms, and his wife Margarete, the last of the Dalberg line from the family von Schöneberg, had endowed a Saint Leonard's Altar at Saint Martin's Church at Worms as early as 1331. It is likely that the Lords of Dalberg forthwith put the two chapels together, the one at the castle (Saint Anthony's) and the one in the dale (Saint Leonard's), putting them both in one altarist's care. Dalberg's first clergyman, as far as is known, was a man named Nikolaus Vickis, who from 1500 to 1506 was likewise the altarist of Saint Valentine's Altar at the hospital in Oppenheim. It is believed that he also took on clerical duties for the village in the dale (Dalberg). It could be that the remuneration for this post was low, for even the Michael Schmitt from Wallhausen that Wolff von Dalberg appointed in 1538 had already been working since 1536 as the altarist of Saint Margaret's Altar at Spabrücken.

== Economy and infrastructure ==
There are hardly any earning opportunities in Dalberg, only a few small businesses and the village's last winemaker. The inhabitants commute to Bad Kreuznach and the Frankfurt Rhine Main Region.
