= Linda Dahlberg =

American public health researcher

Linda Lee Dahlberg is an American public health researcher and the senior advisor to the director in the Division of Violence Prevention (DVP). The DVP is part of the Centers for Disease Control's National Center for Injury Prevention and Control. She formerly served as the DVP's associate director for science. She received her Ph.D. in sociology from Indiana University Bloomington in 1995 with a dissertation entitled Pathways of change: The transition to adulthood in nineteenth century Indianapolis, 1860-1880. She has published multiple studies on the subject of gun violence in the United States.
