= John Acton =

John Acton is the name of:

- John Acton (MP) for Droitwich (UK Parliament constituency) in 1597
- Sir John Acton, 6th Baronet (1736–1811), prime minister of Naples
- John Dalberg-Acton, 1st Baron Acton (1834–1902), English historian
- John Lyon-Dalberg-Acton, 3rd Baron Acton (1907–1989), British peer
- John Lyon-Dalberg-Acton, 5th Baron Acton (born 1966), English writer and farmer
- John Acton (canon lawyer) (died 1350), English canon lawyer, known for his commentary on the writer on the ecclesiastical Constitutions of two papal legates of the thirteenth century
- John C. Acton, United States Coast Guard rear admiral
