= Edthena =

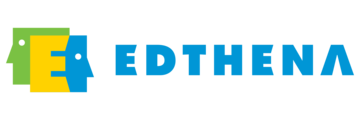
- Company type: Private
- Industry: Education technology
- Founded: 2011; 15 years ago
- Founder: Adam Geller
- Headquarters: San Francisco, California, U.S.
- Area served: United States
- Products: VC3 (formerly Edthena Video Coaching); AI Coach; Observation Copilot
- Services: SaaS platform for teacher professional development
- Website: edthena.com

Edthena is an American education technology company based in San Francisco, California.

== History ==
Edthena was founded in 2011 by Adam Geller, a former science teacher. During its pilot year, Edthena partnered with Teach For America and teacher training programs at the University of Washington and the University of Michigan, recording more than 20,000 minutes of classroom video to help teachers in professional learning.

Edthena later relocated to California. During the 2010s, Edthena expanded its user base to school districts and teacher preparation programs. By 2021, it was serving institutions in more than 30 states. Also, in 2021, Edthena launched a US$1.5 million Innovation Fund to support new district partners with implementation costs.

A 2023 study published in Humanities and Social Sciences Communications (Nature Portfolio) examined preservice teachers using Edthena for video-based self-reflection at King Saud University and found improvements in 11 of 14 targeted teaching competencies.

In 2024, researchers at the University of Virginia and University at Albany received a $1.4 million grant from the Gates Foundation to develop AI models for analyzing classroom instruction, with Edthena founder Adam Geller as a co-investigator.

== Platforms ==
Edthena operates on a software-as-a-service (SaaS) model, licensing its platform to educational organizations via subscription or per-user fees. The original video coaching platform called Edthena facilitated video-based coaching, peer observation, and instructional rounds, which was later renamed as Edthena Video Coaching and recently as VC3.

The video coaching platform enables teachers to upload classroom videos for timestamped feedback from peers and coaches. The system supports various professional development activities, including formal evaluations and self-reflection.

In 2024, Edthena released an upgraded platform, VC3, which introduced enhanced collaboration tools and analytics dashboards.

AI Coach by Edthena was launched in February 2022. It is a virtual assistant that utilizes conversational AI to guide teachers through self-coaching cycles. The tool prompts teachers with open-ended questions to encourage reflection and identifies key moments in lesson videos. In 2024, Edthena partnered with Digital Promise to include science of reading content within AI Coach.

Observation Copilot was introduced in 2025. It is an AI tool designed to assist school administrators by converting observation notes into structured feedback reports. The tool aligns narrative feedback with district teaching frameworks.

== Awards and recognition ==
Edthena has received multiple industry awards. In 2016, the video coaching platform won the SIIA CODiE Award for Best Professional Learning Solution. District Administration magazine named it a "Top Product" in 2016 and 2022.

In 2023, the AI Coach platform received an EdTech Breakthrough Award. In 2025, TIME and Statista included Edthena in their ranking of the "World's Top EdTech Companies 2025." Later that year, TIME named Edthena's AI Coach one of the "Best Inventions" of 2025.

In 2025, Observation Copilot received a SmartBrief Education Readers' Choice Award.
