= Shane Acton =

British sailor

- Born: Shane John Acton; 17 September 1946; Cambridge, Cambridgeshire, England
- Died: 25 February 2002 (aged 55); Cambridge, Cambridgeshire, England
- Resting place: Cambridge Crematorium
- Occupation: Sailor
- Years active: 1972–1980
- Known for: Circumnavigating the world in an 18-foot boat
- Partner(s): Iris Derungs; Sandie Watts

Shane John Acton (17 September 1946 – 25 February 2002) was an English sailor, known for circumnavigating the globe in an 18-foot (5.5 m) boat, the smallest ever, at that time, to survive the voyage. He first set sail from Britain in 1972 at the age of 25.

Acton was born and raised in Histon, Cambridge, England. Without any sailing experience, he departed in a used 18' 4" bilge-keel sailing boat for which he paid the modest sum of £400. The boat was a Caprice, a Robert Tucker design originally named Super Shrimp but referred to by Shane simply as Shrimpy. Later Shane was accompanied for much of the voyage by his girlfriend, Iris Derungs, a photographer from Switzerland. He sailed westabout through the Panama Canal, circling the globe and returning to England as a local celebrity eight years later. The voyage is chronicled in his book Shrimpy: A Record Round-the-World Voyage in an Eighteen Foot Yacht.

In 1984, he set off on a second voyage from England to Central America via the French canals, the Mediterranean and the Canary Islands and wrote a book of this voyage Shrimpy sails again.

He lived his later years near Golfito, Costa Rica, and died of lung cancer on February 25, 2002 in Cambridge, aged 55.

== Sources ==
- A Speck on the Sea, William H. Longyard. McGraw-Hill, 2003.
- Cambridge News, "World Trip Record Sailor Dies." Feb 27, 2002.
- Shrimpy: A Record Round-the-World Voyage in an Eighteen Foot Yacht, Shane Acton. Motorbooks International, 1993.
