= Ragnar Dahlberg =

Swedish television presenter and producer

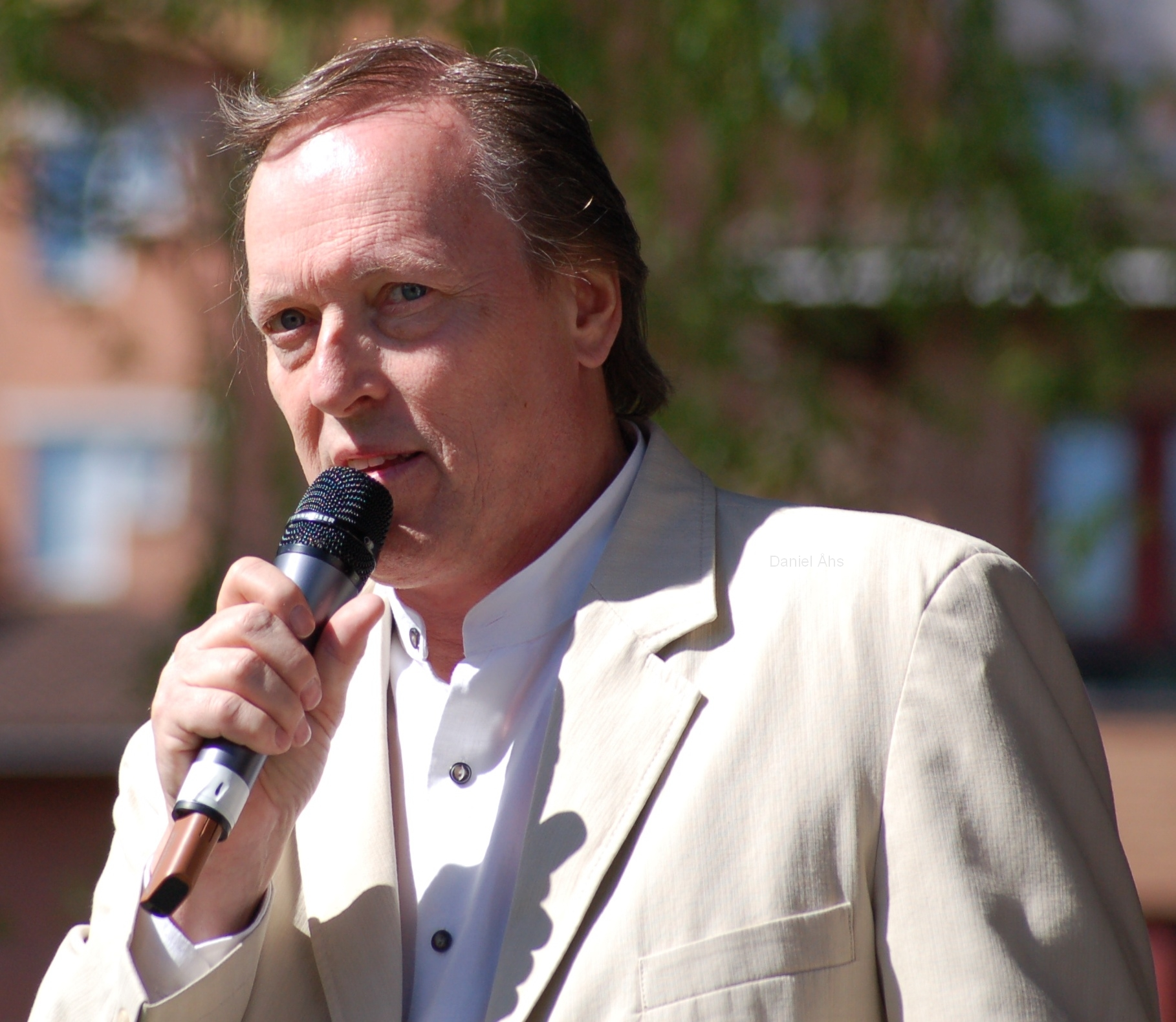
- Ragnar Dahlberg in Norrköping in 2007.
- Born: 15 February 1943 (age 83); Stockholm, Sweden
- Occupations: television presenter, television producer
- Known for: Café Norrköping, Go'kväll

Per Ragnar Dahlberg, (born 15 February 1943 in Stockholm) is a Swedish television presenter and producer who works for SVT in Norrköping. He has presented shows like Café Norrköping and Go'kväll during the 1980s and 1990s. In March 2007, he ended his career at the channel.
