= Richard Lyon-Dalberg-Acton =

Richard Lyon-Dalberg-Acton may refer to:

- Richard Lyon-Dalberg-Acton, 2nd Baron Acton (1870–1924), British peer and diplomat
- Richard Lyon-Dalberg-Acton, 4th Baron Acton (1941–2010), British Labour politician
