= Carlo Acton =

Italian composer and concert pianist

Carlo Eduardo Acton
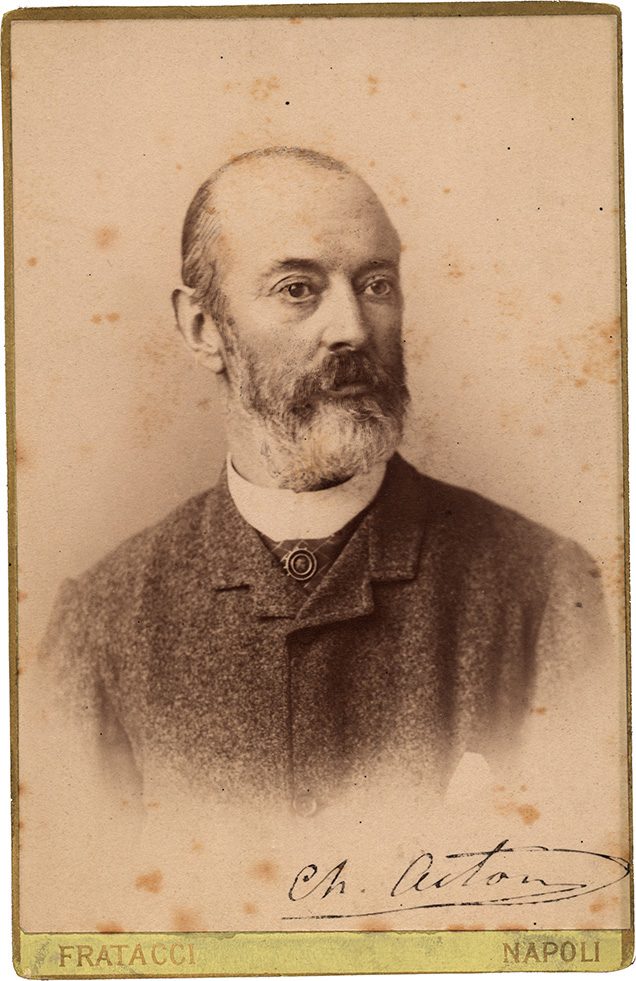
- Born: 25 August 1829; Naples, Kingdom of the Two Sicilies
- Died: 2 February 1909 (aged 79); Naples, Kingdom of Italy
- Occupations: Composer, Pianist
- Known for: Opera Una cena in convitto; sacred music, including Tantum ergo
- Parent(s): Francis Charles Acton and Esther Fagan
- Relatives: Sir John Acton, 6th Baronet (great-uncle), Robert Fagan (maternal grandfather)

Carlo Eduardo Acton (25 August 1829 – 2 February 1909) was an Italian composer and concert pianist. He is particularly remembered for his opera Una cena in convitto and for his sacred music compositions of which his Tantum ergo is the most well-known.

His father, Francis Charles Acton (1796-1865), was the youngest son of General Joseph Acton, younger brother of Sir John Acton, 6th Baronet. His mother Esther was a daughter of the Irish painter Robert Fagan.
