= Bud Acton =

American basketball player (born 1942)

Personal information
- Born: January 11, 1942 (age 84)
- Listed height: 6 ft 6 in (1.98 m)
- Listed weight: 210 lb (95 kg)

Career information
- High school: Troy (Troy, Michigan)
- College: Alma (1961–1964); Hillsdale (1965–1966)
- NBA draft: 1966: undrafted
- Playing career: 1966–1968
- Position: Small forward
- Number: 24

Career history
- 1966–1967: Holland Carvers
- 1967–1968: Battle Creek Braves
- 1968: San Diego Rockets

Career highlights
- MIAA Player of the Year (1964); 2× First-team All-MIAA (1963, 1964)
- Stats at NBA.com
- Stats at Basketball Reference

Charles R. "Bud" Acton (born January 11, 1942) is an American former professional basketball player. He played college basketball for the Alma Scots and Hillsdale Chargers. Acton was the Michigan Intercollegiate Athletic Association (MIAA) Player of the Year with the Scots in 1964. He played in the National Basketball Association (NBA) for the San Diego Rockets during the 1967–68 NBA season.

== Early life ==
Acton survived an accidental shotgun blast to the jaw when he was aged twelve. He attended Troy High School in Troy, Michigan.

== College career ==
Acton started his collegiate career with Alma College. He was selected to the All-Michigan Intercollegiate Athletic Association (MIAA) first-team in 1963. He broke the MIAA seasonal and single game scoring records during the 1963–64 season. Acton was selected as the MIAA Player of the Year in 1964 and became the first player from Alma to win the award.

Acton was dismissed from Alma College in 1964 because he missed too many chapel sessions. Although Alma officials had expected him to return the following year, Acton transferred to Hillsdale College where he broke the basketball program's single-season point marks.

Acton was inducted into the Alma College Athletics Hall of Fame in 2019.

== Professional career ==
Acton began his professional career with the Holland Carvers of the North American Basketball League (NABL). On November 5, 1967, he was traded to the Battle Creek Braves.

On February 1, 1968, Acton was loaned to the San Diego Rockets of the National Basketball Association. He had been the second-leading rebounder in the NABL with 14.3 rebounds per game at the time of his signing. Acton recorded four points in his NBA debut in a loss to the San Francisco Warriors. On February 16, he was sold to the Rockets. Acton averaged 3.3 points and 2 rebounds per game in 23 appearances with the Rockets. He was waived by the Rockets in August 1968.

== NBA career statistics ==
Legend
GP	Games played	GS	Games started	MPG	Minutes per game
FG%	Field goal percentage	3P%	3-point field goal percentage	FT%	Free throw percentage
RPG	Rebounds per game	APG	Assists per game	SPG	Steals per game
BPG	Blocks per game	PPG	Points per game	**Bold**	Career high

=== Regular season ===
Year	Team	GP	GS	MPG	FG%	3P%	FT%	RPG	APG	SPG	BPG	PPG
1967–68	San Diego	23	–	8.5	.392	–	.655	2.0	.5	–	–	3.3
Career		23	–	8.5	.392	–	.655	2.0	.5	–	–	3.3

== Personal life ==
Acton's older brothers, John and Jack, played basketball for the Alma Scots during the late 1950s. His younger brother, Sim, and a cousin, Bob, played on the Scots football team.
