= Thomas Acton (Jesuit) =

Thomas Acton (1662 – 21 March 1721), real name Thomas Dupuy, was an English Jesuit. He joined the society on 25 November 1684. In 1701, he resided at the college of Liège, as prefect of the spirit. In 1704, he was a missionary in the college of Thomas Becket; and died at Saint-Omer in 1721.
