= Ralph Acton =

English theologian and philosopher

Ralph Acton (fl. 14th century), was a supposed English theologian and philosopher, apparently primarily known for his writings, some of which still exist. More recent enquiries suggest that Acton may have been a scribe or, indeed, non-existent.

== Biography ==
According to the 1885 Dictionary of National Biography, Ralph Acton is assigned by Leland and his followers to the first half of the fourteenth century. Of the details of his life nothing definite is known, for the sketch given by Bale and Pitts is so vague as to suggest that it is chiefly made up of inferences. According to these writers Ralph received his early education in country schools, whence in due time he proceeded to Oxford. After taking his master's degree in philosophy and theology at this university he was appointed head of a famous church (‘rector cujusdam insignis ecclesiæ’), and henceforward devoted himself in the retirement of his parish to the study of the Scriptures and the care of his flock.

His writings apparently consist of Homiliæ in quatuor Evangelia, Commentarii in Epistolas Paulinas, Illustrationes in Petrum Langobardum, and other works of a similar kind. Two manuscripts of this author are still preserved in the library of Lincoln College, Oxford-—the one written in an early fifteenth-century hand; the other the gift of Robert Fleming, a near kinsman of Richard Fleming, the founder of this college (1427). We thus get a date later than which our author cannot have flourished; and Leland, Bale, and Pits conjecturally assign him to the reign of Edward II (1320). Other manuscripts of Acton's works are said by Tanner to be in the Bodleian Library and that of Peterhouse, Cambridge.

== Literary ghost ==
More recent study, summarised in Acton's Oxford Dictionary of National Biography entry suggest that Bale misidentified the author of a number of works, which are in fact by Radulfus Ardens, attributing them mistakenly to a Ralph Acton, who may have been a scribe or book name, rather than an author.
