= Admiral Acton =

Admiral Acton may refer to:

- Alfredo Acton (1867–1934), Italian rear admiral
- Ferdinando Acton (1832–1891), Italian admiral
- Guglielmo Acton (1825–1896), Italian admiral
- John C. Acton (fl. 1970s–2000s), U.S. Coast Guard rear admiral
