= Baron Acton =

Title in the Peerage of the UK

Barony of Acton
- Arms of Lyon-Dalberg-Acton
- Creation date: 11 December 1869
- Created by: Queen Victoria
- Peerage: Peerage of the United Kingdom
- First holder: Sir John Dalberg-Acton, 8th Baronet
- Present holder: John Lyon-Dalberg-Acton, 5th Baron Acton
- Heir presumptive: Robert Peter Lyon-Dalberg-Acton
- Remainder to: the 1st Baron's heirs male of the body lawfully begotten
- Subsidiary titles: Baronet Acton of Aldenham, Marquess of Groppoli (in the Grand Duchy of Tuscany)

Baron Acton, of Aldenham in the County of Shropshire, is a title in the Peerage of the United Kingdom. It was created on 11 December 1869 for Sir John Dalberg-Acton, 8th Baronet, a prominent historian and Liberal Member of Parliament.

His son, the second Baron, was a diplomat and also held minor office in the Liberal administrations of Sir Henry Campbell-Bannerman and H. H. Asquith. In 1919, he assumed by Royal licence the additional surname of Lyon, which was that of his father-in-law. His son, the third Baron, sold the family home in 1947 and settled in Rhodesia. The fourth Baron, who succeeded his father in 1989, lost his seat in the House of Lords after the passing of the House of Lords Act 1999. However, on 17 April 2000, he was created a life peer as Baron Acton of Bridgnorth, of Aldenham in the County of Shropshire. Consequently, Lord Acton was able to return to the House of Lords, where he sat on the Labour benches. As of 2014, the titles are held by his son, the fifth Baron, who succeeded in 2010.

The Acton Baronetcy, of Aldenham in the County of Shropshire, was created in the Baronetage of England on 17 January 1644 for Edward Acton. He represented Bridgnorth in both the Short Parliament and the Long Parliament, and he was a supporter of Charles I during the Civil War. His son, the second Baronet, grandson, the third Baronet, and great-grandson, the fourth Baronet, all sat as Members of Parliament for Bridgnorth. On the death of the latter's son, the fifth Baronet, the line of the eldest son of the second Baronet failed.

The title was inherited by the fifth Baronet's second cousin once removed, the sixth Baronet. He was the son of Edward Acton, who had settled in Besançon in France as a physician; Edward (of Besançon) was the son of another Edward, son of Walter, second son of Sir Walter Acton (the second Baronet). The sixth Baronet served as Prime Minister of the Kingdom of Naples and married his niece, Mary Anne Acton. He was created Duke of Modica by King Ferdinand III of Sicily but later renounced the title.^{A} Their second son, Charles Januarius Edward Acton, known as Cardinal Acton, was a prominent clergyman in the Catholic Church.

Upon the sixth Baronet's death in 1811, he was succeeded by his eldest son, the seventh Baronet. In 1832, he married Marie Louise Pelline von Dalberg, only child and heiress of Emmerich Joseph von Dalberg, Duke of Dalberg, a member of an ancient German aristocratic family. The Actons became heirs to the Marquess of Groppoli in Tuscany through the Duke's wife Pellina Brignole-Sale. In 1833, the seventh Baronet assumed by Royal Licence the surname of Dalberg-Acton. He was succeeded by his son, the eighth Baronet, who in 1869 was elevated to the peerage as Baron Acton.

In 1919, the second Baron assumed by Royal Licence the surname of Lyon-Dalberg-Acton. In 2010, upon the death of the fourth Baron, the Acton titles of baronet and baron passed to John Lyon-Dalberg-Acton. As of 31 December 2013, he has not formally proven his succession to the baronetcy and is therefore not on the Official Roll of the Baronetage, with the baronetcy formally considered dormant.

The family seat was Aldenham Park near Bridgnorth, Shropshire, which was sold in 1959.

== Coat of arms ==
The heraldic blazon for the coat of arms of the Lyon-Dalberg-Acton family is: Quarterly: 1st and 4th: Gules, semée of cross crosslets fitchée or two lions passant guardant in pale argent (for Acton); 2nd, quarterly: 1st and 4th: Azure, six fleurs-de-lis three two and one argent a chief dancetty of the last; 2nd and 3rd: Or, a cross patonce gules over all an escutcheon gules thereon a tower argent a chief dancetty of the last (for Dalberg); 3rd: Azure, a lion passant or between three plates each charged with a griffin's head erased sable (for Lyon).

Acton

Acton quartering Dalberg

Quarterly of 4: 1&4: Acton; 2: Dalberg; 3: Lyon

== Acton baronets, of Aldenham (1644) ==
- Sir Edward Acton, 1st Baronet (1600–1659)
- Sir Walter Acton, 2nd Baronet (1623–1665)
- Sir Edward Acton, 3rd Baronet (c. 1650–1716)
- Sir Whitmore Acton, 4th Baronet (1678–1732)
- Sir Richard Acton, 5th Baronet (1712–1791)
- Sir John Francis Edward Acton, 6th Baronet (1736–1811)
- Sir Ferdinand Richard Edward Dalberg-Acton, 7th Baronet (1801–1837)
- Sir John Emerich Edward Dalberg-Acton, 8th Baronet (1834–1902) (created Baron Acton in 1869)

== Barons Acton (1869) ==
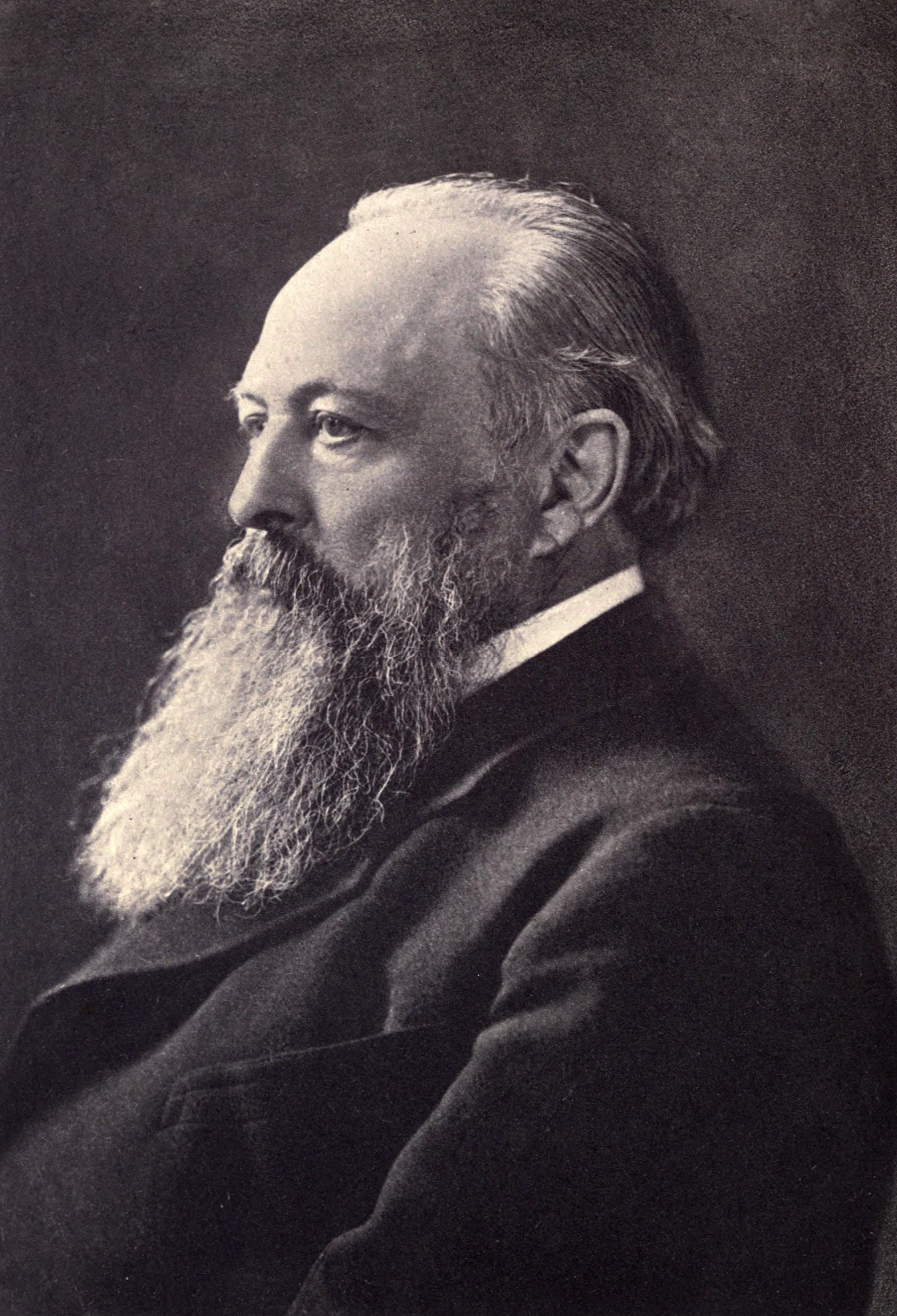
John Dalberg-Acton, 1st Baron Acton

- John Emerich Edward Dalberg-Acton, 1st Baron Acton (1834–1902)
- Richard Maximilian Lyon-Dalberg-Acton, 2nd Baron Acton (1870–1924)
- John Emerich Henry Lyon-Dalberg-Acton, 3rd Baron Acton (1907–1989)
- Richard Gerald Lyon-Dalberg-Acton, 4th Baron Acton (1941–2010)
- John Charles Ferdinand Harold Lyon-Dalberg-Acton, 5th Baron Acton (b. 1966)

The heir presumptive is the present holder's uncle, Robert Peter Lyon-Dalberg-Acton (b. 1946).
The heir presumptive's heir apparent is his son, Christopher Richard Henri Lyon-Dalberg-Acton (b. 1977). He is a partner at Macfarlanes.
The heir presumptive's heir apparent's heir apparent is his son, John Edward Roger Lyon-Dalberg-Acton (b. 2010).

== Princes of Leporano (1624) ==
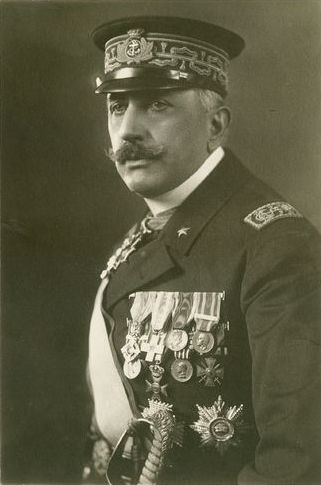
Admiral Alfredo Acton

- Alfredo Acton, 1st Barone Acton (1867–1934)
- Ferdinando Amedeo Maria Acton, 12th Prince of Leporano, 2nd Barone Acton (1908–1979)
- Giovanni Alfredo Maria Acton, 13th Prince of Leporano, 3rd Barone Acton (1948–2022)
- Maria Eleonora Carlotta Acton, 14th Princess of Leporano (b. 1949)

The heir presumptive is the present holder's son, Francesco Taccone, nobile dei marchesi of Stizzano (b. 1977).

Alfredo Acton was awarded the title of baron in the Kingdom of Italy by motu proprio of Victor Emmanuel III in February 1925. From the marriage of Alfredo Acton with Livia Giudice Caracciolo, nobile dei principi of Villa and Cellammare (1878–1963), the Acton family received the title of Prince of Leporano and Neapolitan patrician. The title of the Kingdom of Naples was created on 1 January 1626 for Don Sergio Muscettola (d. 1646) passed to the Caracciolo family in the 19th century and then went to the Acton family.

In 1979, 30 June, Don Ferdinando obtained from Royal Letters Patent of Umberto II the renewal of the title of Duke of Spezzano and Count of Picerno with the confirmation of transmissibility of the titles to his daughter Maria Eleonora.

== Notes ==
A.The title was hereditary but was later renounced by Acton. See Archivio Storico per le Province Napoletane, Terza serie Anno XIX - XCVIII (1980), p. 437
