= Richard Lyon-Dalberg-Acton, 4th Baron Acton =

British Labour Party politician and peer

The Right Honourable The Lord Acton
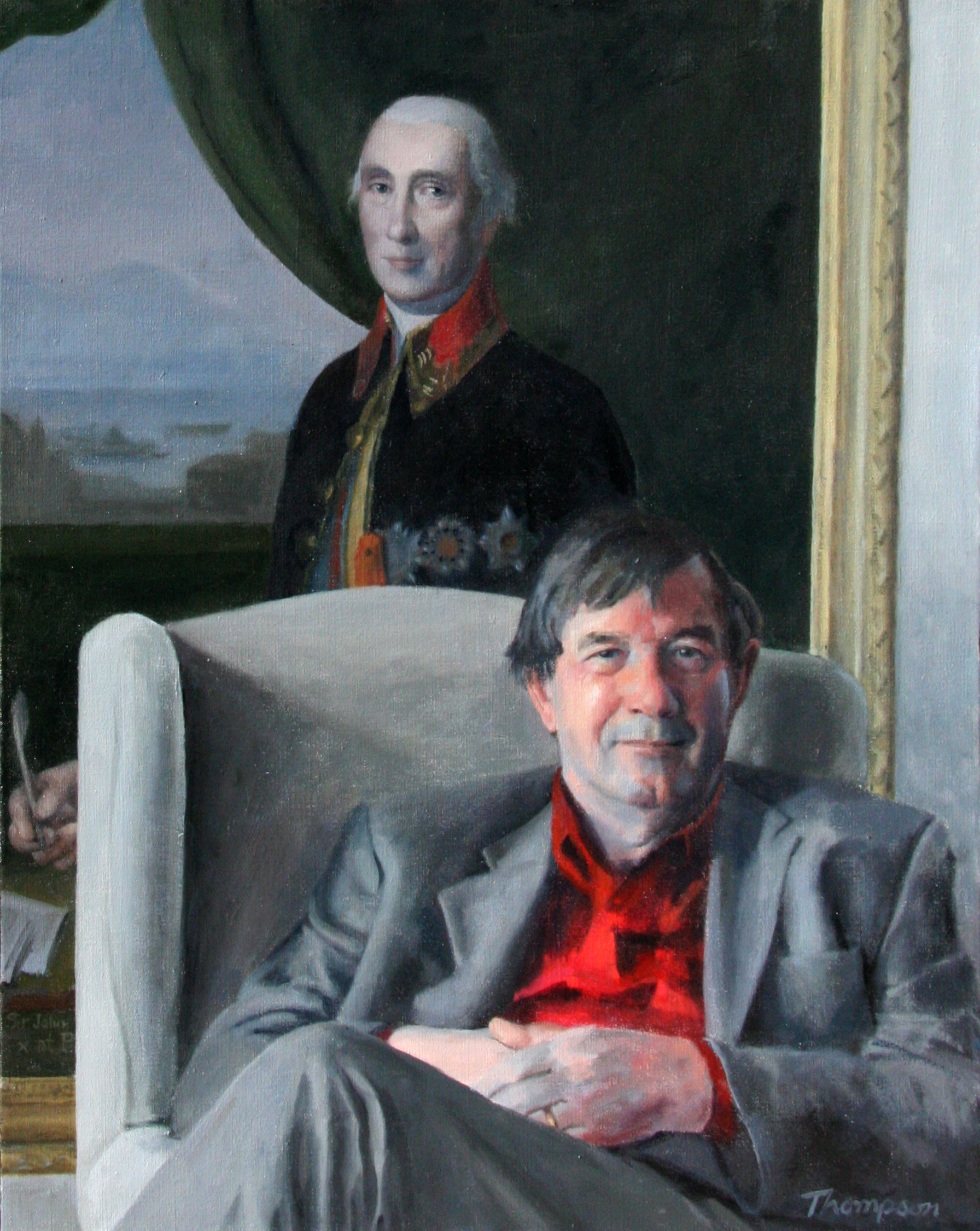
- Portrait by Peter Thompson, 2008

Member of the House of Lords
- Lord Temporal
- Hereditary peerage 23 January 1989 – 11 November 1999
- Preceded by: The 3rd Baron Acton
- Succeeded by: Seat abolished
- Life peerage 17 April 2000 – 10 October 2010

Personal details
- Born: 30 July 1941 London, United Kingdom
- Died: 10 October 2010 (aged 69) Cedar Rapids, Iowa, USA
- Party: Labour
- Spouses: Hilary Cookson (m. 1965; died 1973) Judith Todd (m. 1974; div. 1984) Patricia Nassif (m. 1988)
- Children: John
- Parent: John Lyon-Dalberg-Acton, 3rd Baron Acton (father)
- Relatives: Richard Lyon-Dalberg-Acton, 2nd Baron Acton (grandfather) Lord Acton (great-grandfather)
- Education: Trinity College, Oxford
- Occupation: Barrister

Richard Gerald Lyon-Dalberg-Acton, 4th Baron Acton, Baron Acton of Bridgnorth (30 July 1941 – 10 October 2010) was a British Labour Party politician and peer.

== Early life and education ==
The oldest son of John Lyon-Dalberg-Acton and Daphne Strutt, daughter of Robert Strutt, 4th Baron Rayleigh, he was educated at St George's College in Salisbury, Southern Rhodesia (now Harare, Zimbabwe) and at Trinity College, Oxford, from which he emerged with a Bachelor of Arts in 1963 (later, he would receive a Master of Arts from the same institution).

== Career ==
He served a term as director of Coutts & Co before being admitted to Inner Temple in 1976 and practising law for about four years. He then served as a Senior Law Officer of the Ministry of Justice, Legal and Parliamentary Affairs of Zimbabwe from 1981 until 1985.

He became the 4th Baron Acton, as well as 11th Baronet of Aldenham in 1989, upon his father's death. He lost his seat in the House of Lords after the passage of the House of Lords Act 1999, which he notably supported. However, on 17 April 2000, he was created a life peer as Baron Acton of Bridgnorth, of Aldenham in the County of Shropshire, enabling him to return to the House.

Lord Acton sat on the Labour benches and served on the Constitution Committee and on the Joint Committee on Consolidation Bills.

== Personal life ==
From 1965 to 1973, Acton was married to Hilary Cookson, with whom he had a son, Johnny. After having been a widower for a year, he married Judith Todd, the daughter of Sir Garfield Todd, former Prime Minister of Southern Rhodesia. The marriage ended in 1984.

In 1988, Acton married his third wife, Patricia Nassif, a professor at the University of Iowa College of Law in Iowa City, Iowa, United States. He divided his time between London and Cedar Rapids, Iowa. The couple remained married until his death.

Lord Acton was succeeded by his son from his first marriage and only child John Lyon-Dalberg-Acton, 5th Baron Acton.

Peerage of the United Kingdom
Preceded by John Lyon-Dalberg-Acton	Baron Acton; 1989–2010	Succeeded by John Lyon-Dalberg-Acton
