= John Dalberg-Acton, 1st Baron Acton =

English historian and politician (1834–1902)

The Right Honourable The Lord Acton KCVO DL
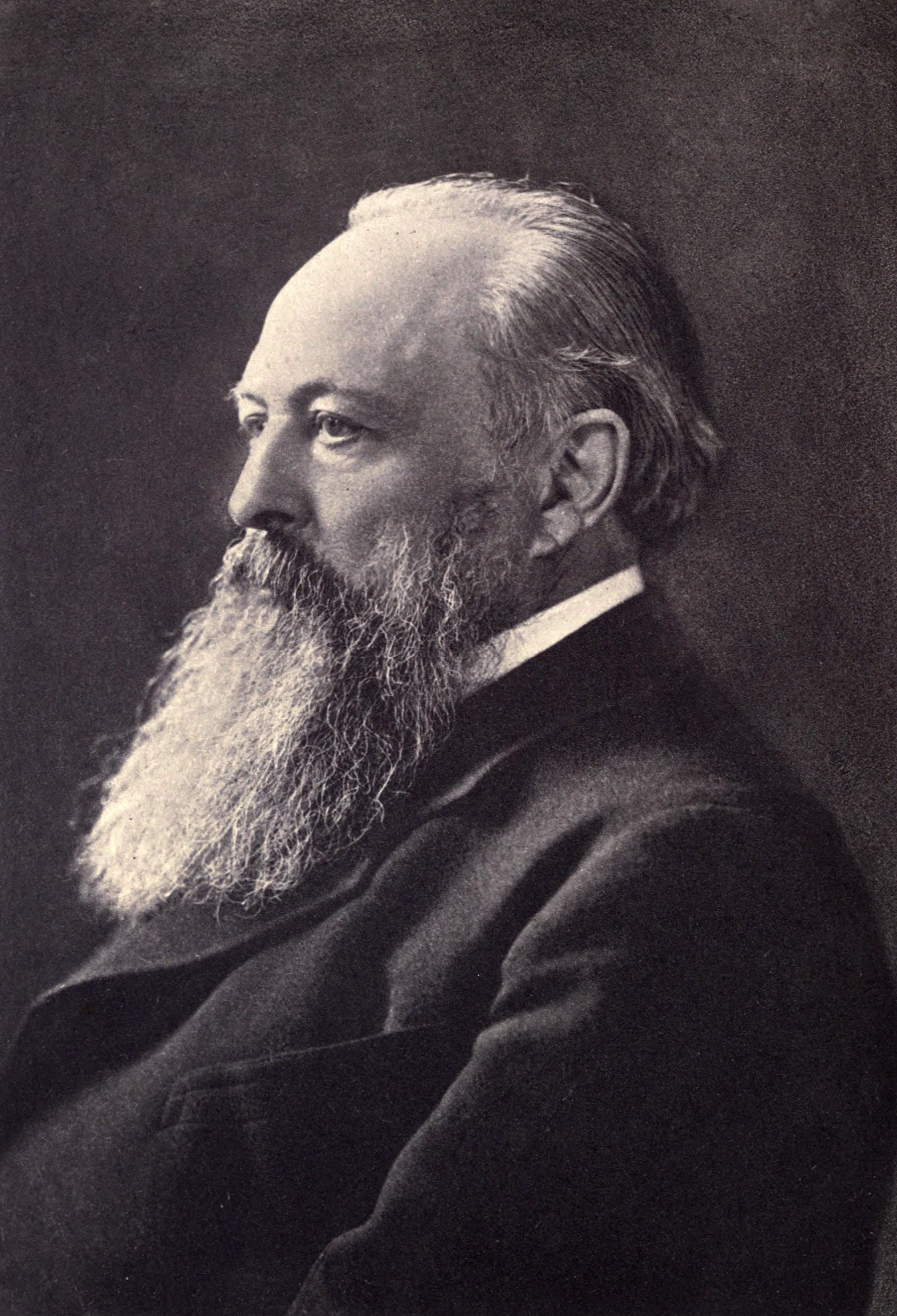

Member of Parliament
- In office 25 July 1865 – 1866 Serving with John Pritchard
- Preceded by: Henry Whitmore
- Succeeded by: Henry Whitmore
- Constituency: Bridgnorth
- In office 19 May 1859 – 25 July 1865
- Preceded by: John Alexander
- Succeeded by: Thomas Stock
- Constituency: Carlow

Personal details
- Born: John Emerich Edward Dalberg-Acton; 10 January 1834 Naples, Two Sicilies
- Died: 19 June 1902 (aged 68) Tegernsee, Bavaria, German Empire
- Party: Liberal
- Spouse: Countess Marie von Arco auf Valley (m. 1865)
- Relations: Anton Graf von Arco auf Valley (nephew); Alex Callinicos (great-grandson)
- Children: 6, including Richard
- Parent: Sir Ferdinand Dalberg-Acton, 7th Baronet (father)
- Education: Oscott College
- Alma mater: LMU Munich
- Occupation: Historian; politician

John Emerich Edward Dalberg-Acton, 1st Baron Acton, 13th Marquess of Groppoli, KCVO DL (10 January 1834 – 19 June 1902), better known as Lord Acton, was an English Catholic historian, Liberal politician, and writer. A strong advocate for individual liberty, Acton is best known for his observation on the dangers of concentrated authority. In an 1887 letter to an Anglican bishop, he famously wrote, 'Power tends to corrupt, and absolute power corrupts absolutely', underscoring his belief that unchecked power poses the greatest threat to human freedom. His works consistently emphasised the importance of limiting governmental and institutional power in favour of individual rights and personal liberty.

== Early life and background ==
The only son of Sir Ferdinand Dalberg-Acton, 7th Baronet, and grandson of the Neapolitan admiral and prime minister Sir John Acton, 6th Baronet (who succeeded to the baronetcy and estates held by another branch of the Acton family in Shropshire in 1791), Acton was known as Sir John Dalberg-Acton, 8th Baronet, from 1837 to 1869. His grandfather was part of a younger line of the family that had moved to France and Italy, but after the extinction of the elder branch he became the patriarch.

Acton's father, known as Richard, married Marie Louise Pelline, the only daughter of Emmerich Joseph, 1st Duc de Dalberg, a naturalised French noble of ancient German lineage who had entered the French service under Napoleon and represented Louis XVIII at the Congress of Vienna in 1814. After Sir Richard Acton's death in 1837, she became the wife of the 2nd Earl Granville (1840). Marie Louise Pelline de Dalberg was heiress of Herrnsheim in Germany. She became the mother of John Dalberg-Acton who was born in Naples. His father died in Paris when he was three.

He was raised as a Roman Catholic, and was educated at Oscott College, under the future-Cardinal Nicholas Wiseman, until 1848. He then studied privately at Edinburgh. He was denied entry to the University of Cambridge because he was a Catholic, and subsequently went to Munich where he studied at the Ludwig-Maximilians-Universität München (LMU) and resided in the house of Johann Joseph Ignaz von Döllinger, the theologian and forerunner of the Old Catholic Church, with whom he became lifelong friends. Döllinger inspired in him a deep love of historical research and a profound conception of its functions as a critical instrument in the study of sociopolitical liberty.

He was a master of the principal foreign languages, and began at an early age to collect a magnificent historical library, which he intended to use to compose a "History of Liberty". In politics, he was always an ardent Liberal.

== Career ==
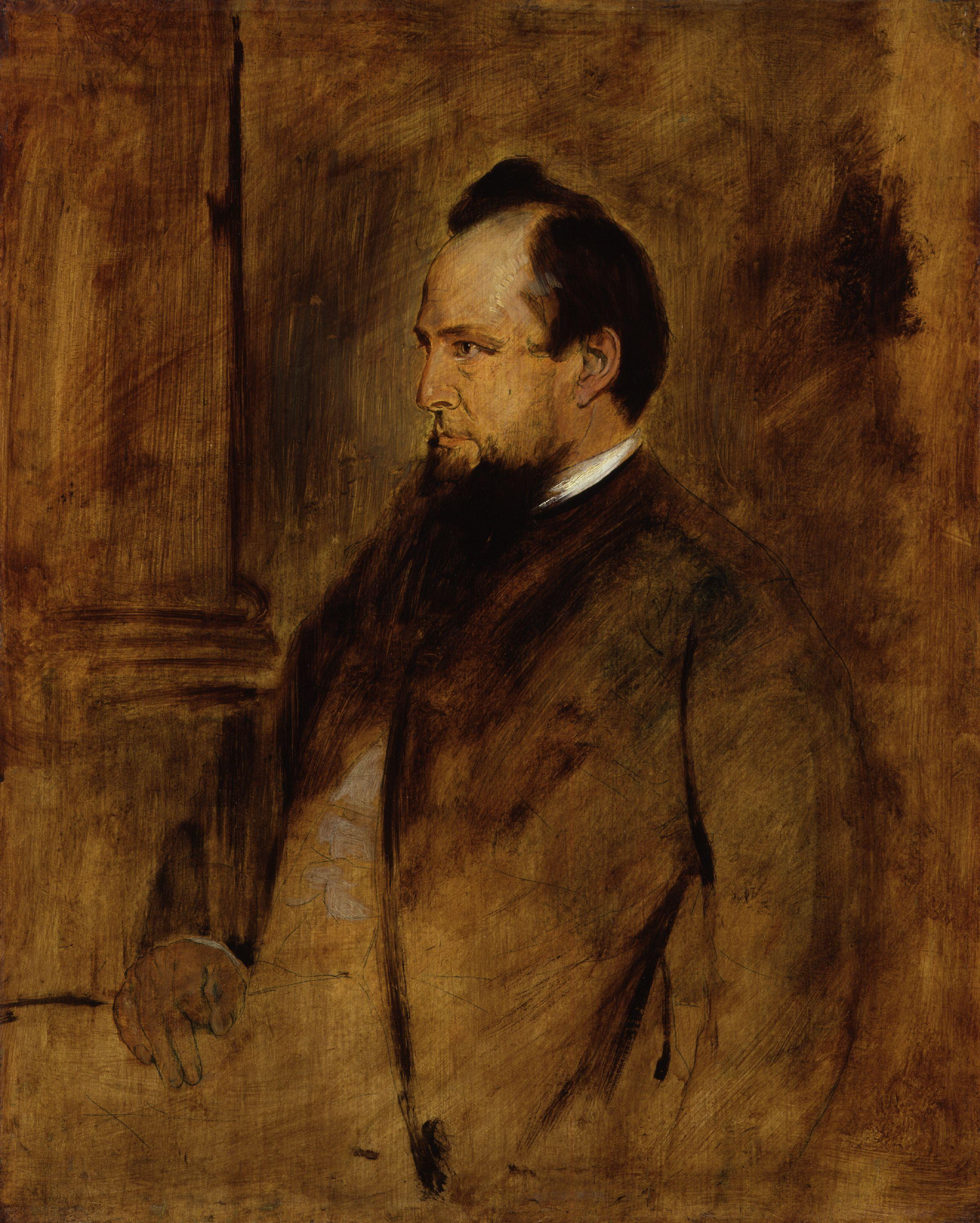
Portrait of John Acton by Franz Seraph von Lenbach, c. 1879.

During his extensive travels, Acton spent much time in the chief intellectual centres of Europe, reading the correspondence of historical personalities. Among his friends were Montalembert, Tocqueville, Fustel de Coulanges, Bluntschli, von Sybel and Ranke. In 1855, he was appointed deputy lieutenant of Shropshire. A year later, he was attached to Lord Granville's mission to Moscow as British representative at the coronation of Alexander II of Russia.

=== Politics ===
In 1859, Acton settled in England, at his country house, Aldenham, in Shropshire. He was returned to the House of Commons that same year as member for the Irish borough of Carlow and became a devoted admirer and adherent of Prime Minister William Ewart Gladstone. However, Acton was not an active MP, and his parliamentary career came to an end after the general election of 1865, when he headed the Liberal ballot for Bridgnorth near his Shropshire home. Acton nearly defeated Conservative leader Henry Whitmore, but Whitmore successfully petitioned for a scrutiny of the ballots, and thus retained his seat. After the Reform Act 1867, Acton again contested Bridgnorth, this time reduced to a single seat, in 1868 but to no avail.

Acton took a great interest in the United States, considering its federal structure an ideal guarantor of individual liberties. During the American Civil War, his sympathies lay entirely with the Confederacy, for their defence of States' Rights against a centralised government that he believed would inevitably turn tyrannical. His notes to Gladstone on the subject helped sway many in the British government to sympathise with the South. After the South's surrender, he wrote to Robert E. Lee that "I mourn for the stake which was lost at Richmond more deeply than I rejoice over that which was saved at Waterloo," adding that he "deemed that you were fighting battles for our liberty, our progress, and our civilization." Acton's stance on the Confederacy was shared by most English Catholics at the time, both liberal and Ultramontane. The editors of the Ultramontane Tablet denounced Abraham Lincoln as a dangerous radical, and John Henry Newman, when asked for his opinion on the matter, stated that slavery was not "intrinsically evil" and that the issue had to be assessed on a case-by-case basis.

In 1869, Queen Victoria raised Acton to the peerage as Baron Acton, of Aldenham in the County of Shropshire. His elevation came primarily through the intercession of Gladstone. The two were intimate friends and frequent correspondents. Gladstone was particularly concerned to elevate Acton's standing as he headed out to Rome to resist the Pope's plan to have Papal Infallibility confirmed at the Vatican Council. Both Acton and Gladstone opposed this scheme and it was thought that, if Acton were a British Peer, it would strengthen his position in Rome. Matthew Arnold said: "Gladstone influences all round him but Acton; it is Acton who influences Gladstone." Acton was appointed to the Royal Victorian Order as a Knight Commander (KCVO) in the 1897 Birthday Honours. He was also a strong supporter of Irish Home Rule.

=== Religion and writings ===
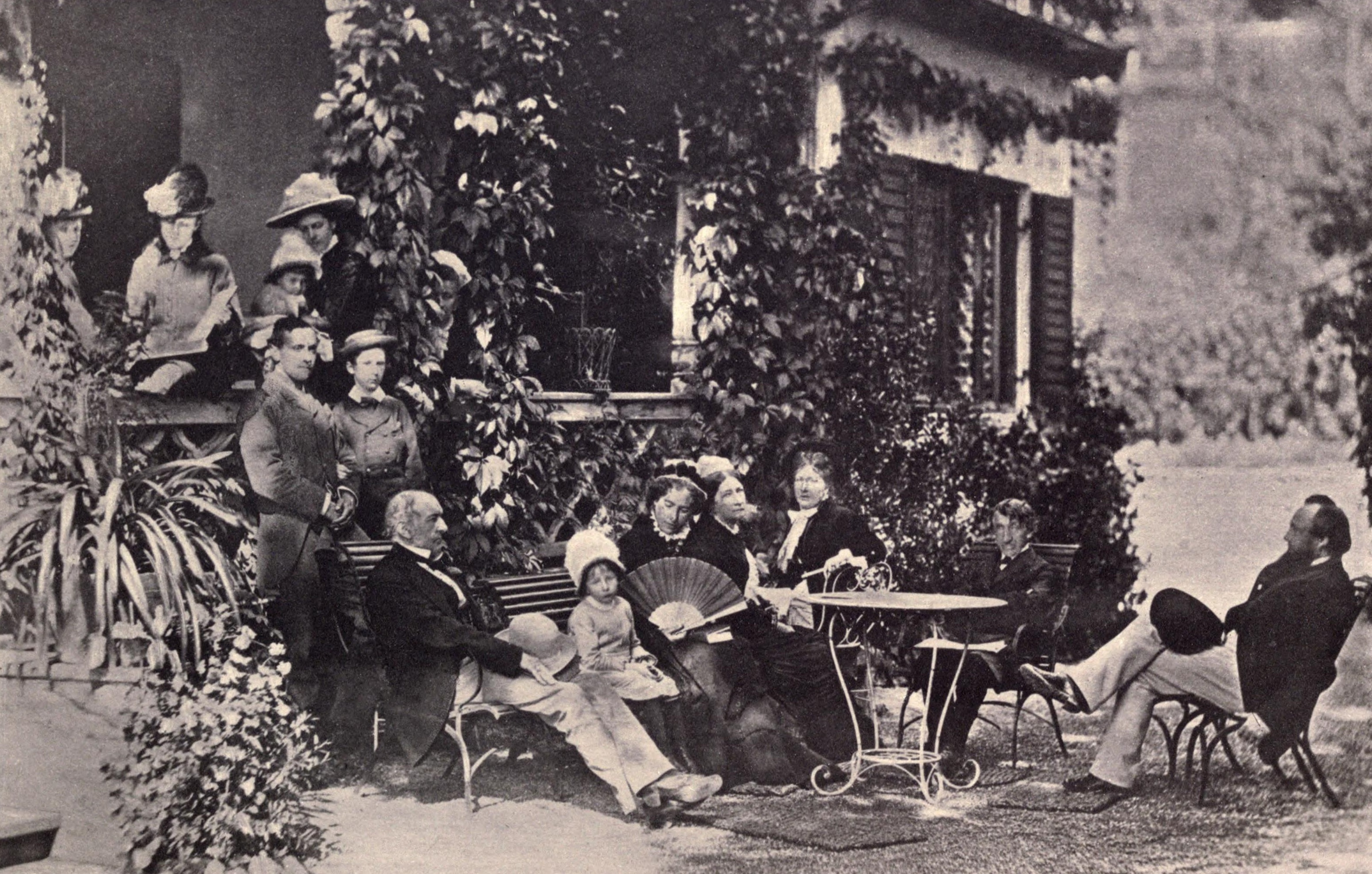
Lord Acton, with Döllinger and William Gladstone, 1879.

Meanwhile, Acton became the editor of the Roman Catholic monthly paper, The Rambler, in 1859, upon John Henry (later Cardinal) Newman's retirement from the editorship. In 1862, he merged this periodical into the Home and Foreign Review. Though a sincere Roman Catholic, his spirit as a historian was hostile to ultramontane pretensions, and his independence of thought and liberalism soon brought him into conflict with the church hierarchy. As early as August 1862, Cardinal Wiseman publicly censured the Review; and when in 1864, after Döllinger's appeal at the Munich Congress for a less hostile attitude towards historical criticism, the pope issued a declaration that the opinions of Catholic writers were subject to the authority of the Roman congregations, Acton felt that there was only one way of reconciling his literary conscience with his ecclesiastical loyalty, and he stopped the publication of his monthly periodical. He continued, however, to contribute articles to the North British Review, which, previously a Scottish Free Church organ, had been acquired by friends in sympathy with him, and which for some years (until 1872, when it ceased publication) promoted the interests of a high-class Liberalism in both temporal and ecclesiastical matters. Acton also did a good deal of lecturing on historical subjects.

In the March 1862 Rambler, Acton wrote:

The Celts are not among the progressive, initiative races, but among those which supply the materials rather than the impulse of history, and are either stationary or retrogressive. The Persians, the Greeks, the Romans, and the Teutons are the only makers of history, the only authors of advancement. Other races possessing a highly developed language, a speculative religion, enjoying luxury and art, attain to a certain pitch of cultivation which they are unable to either communicate or to increase. They are a negative element in the world.

And: "Subjection to a people of a higher capacity for government is of itself no misfortune; and it is to most countries the condition of their political advancement."

In 1870, along with his mentor Döllinger, Acton opposed the moves to promulgate the doctrine of papal infallibility in the First Vatican Council, travelling to Rome to lobby against it, ultimately unsuccessfully. Acton did not become an Old Catholic, and continued attending Mass regularly; he received the last rites on his deathbed. The Catholic Church did not try to force his hand. It was in this context that, in a letter he wrote to scholar and ecclesiastic Mandell Creighton, dated April 1887, Acton made his most famous pronouncement:

But if we might discuss this point until we found that we nearly agreed, and if we do agree thoroughly about the impropriety of Carlylese denunciations and Pharisaism in history, I cannot accept your canon that we are to judge Pope and King unlike other men, with a favourable presumption that they did no wrong. If there is any presumption it is the other way, against the holders of power, increasing as the power increases. Historic responsibility has to make up for the want of legal responsibility. Power tends to corrupt, and absolute power corrupts absolutely. Great men are almost always bad men, even when they exercise influence and not authority, still more when you superadd the tendency or the certainty of corruption by authority. There is no worse heresy than that the office sanctifies the holder of it. That is the point at which the negation of Catholicism and the negation of Liberalism meet and keep high festival, and the end learns to justify the means. You would hang a man of no position like Ravaillac; but if what one hears is true, then Elizabeth asked the gaoler to murder Mary, and William III of England ordered his Scots minister to extirpate a clan. Here are the greatest names coupled with the greatest crimes; you would spare those criminals, for some mysterious reason. I would hang them higher than Haman, for reasons of quite obvious justice, still more, still higher for the sake of historical science.

Thenceforth he steered clear of theological polemics. He devoted himself to reading, study and congenial society. With all his capacity for study, he was a man of the world and a man of affairs, not a bookworm. His only notable publications were a masterly essay in the Quarterly Review of January 1878 on "Democracy in Europe;" two lectures delivered at Bridgnorth in 1877 on "The History of Freedom in Antiquity" and "The History of Freedom in Christianity"—these last the only tangible portions of his long-projected "History of Liberty" (they were published after his death in the 1907 book The History of Freedom and Other Essays). He also contributed an essay on modern German historians to the first number of the English Historical Review, which he had helped to found in 1886.

After 1879 he divided his time between London, Cannes, and Tegernsee in Bavaria, enjoying and reciprocating the society of his friends. In 1872 he was given the honorary degree of Doctor of Philosophy by the Ludwig-Maximilians-Universität München (LMU); in 1888 Cambridge gave him the honorary degree of Doctor of Laws, and in 1889 Oxford the Doctor of Civil Law; and in 1890 he received the high academic accolade of being made a fellow of All Souls College, Oxford.

In 1874, when Gladstone published his pamphlet on The Vatican Decrees in their Bearing on Civil Allegiance, Lord Acton wrote during November and December a series of remarkable letters to The Times, illustrating Gladstone's main theme by numerous historical examples of papal inconsistency, in a way which must have been bitter enough to the ultramontane party, but ultimately disagreeing with Gladstone's conclusion and insisting that the Church itself was better than its premises implied. Acton's letters led to another storm in the English Roman Catholic world, but once more it was considered prudent by the Holy See to leave him alone. In spite of his reservations, he regarded "communion with Rome as dearer than life".

== Personal life ==
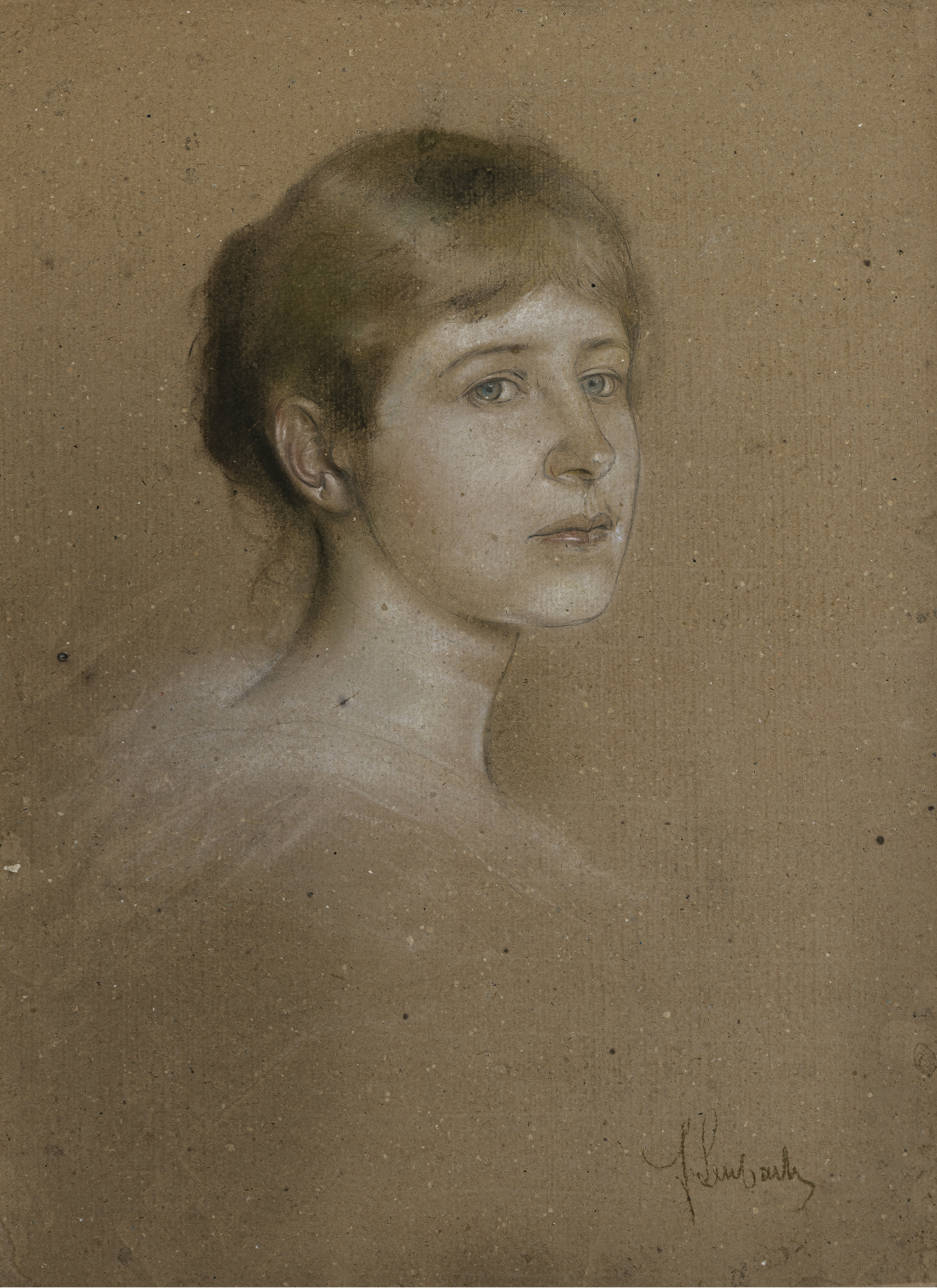
Franz von Lenbach: Portrait of Lady Acton, 1889

On 1 August 1865, Acton married Countess Marie Anna Ludomilla Euphrosina von Arco auf Valley (1841–1923), daughter of the Bavarian Count Maximilian von Arco auf Valley, with whom he had six children:

1. Mary Elizabeth Anne Dalberg-Acton (1866–1951), married Lt-Col. Edward Bleiddian Herbert and had children.
2. Annie Mary Catherine Dalberg-Acton (1868–1917)
3. Richard Lyon-Dalberg-Acton, 2nd Baron Acton (1870–1924)
4. John Dalberg Dalberg-Acton (1872–1873)
5. Elizabeth Mary Dalberg-Acton (1874–1881)
6. Jeanne Marie Dalberg-Acton (1876–1919)

His nephew was Anton Graf von Arco auf Valley (1897–1945), a German count and political activist, and assassin of socialist Bavarian minister-president Kurt Eisner in 1919.

When his cousin Maria, Duchess of Galliera died in 1888, Acton inherited the dormant title of Marquess of Groppoli.

== Professor at Cambridge ==
Acton's reputation for learning spread gradually abroad, largely through Gladstone's influence. Gladstone found him a valuable political adviser, and in 1892, when the Liberal government came in, Lord Acton was made a lord-in-waiting. Finally, in 1895, on the death of Sir John Seeley, Lord Rosebery appointed him to the Regius Professorship of Modern History at Cambridge. He delivered two courses of lectures on the French Revolution and on Modern History, along with private tutoring. The Cambridge Modern History, though he did not live to see it, was planned under his editorship.

== Death and legacy ==
After his health began to fail in 1901, Acton died on 19 June 1902 at his wife's family home in the spa town of Tegernsee, Bavaria, Germany. He was buried in a small communal graveyard by Lake Tegernsee, a grave which today lies unmarked, having lost its headstone in the latter half of the 20th century. He was succeeded in the title by his son, Richard Lyon-Dalberg-Acton, 2nd Baron Acton. His 60,000-volume library, with books full of his own annotations, was purchased prior to his death by Andrew Carnegie in secret, in order to secure the library for Acton's use during his lifetime. Upon Lord Acton's death, it was presented to John Morley, who donated it to the University of Cambridge. According to Hugh Chisholm, author of the article in the 1911 Encyclopædia Britannica:

Lord Acton has left too little completed original work to rank among the great historians; his very learning seems to have stood in his way; he knew too much and his literary conscience was too acute for him to write easily, and his copiousness of information overloads his literary style. But he was one of the most deeply learned men of his time, and he will certainly be remembered for his influence on others.

== Ancestry ==
Ancestors of John Dalberg-Acton, 1st Baron Acton

8. Dr. Edward Acton
4. Sir John Acton, 6th Baronet
9. Catherine Loys
2. Sir Ferdinand Richard Edward Acton
10. Lt-Gen. Joseph Edward Acton
5. Marianna Acton
11. Gräfin Marie Eleanore Berghe von Trips
1. John Dalberg-Acton, 1st Baron Acton
12. Freiherr Wolfgang Heribert Kämmerer von Worms gen. von Dalberg zu Herrnsheim
6. Emmerich Joseph von Dalberg, Duke of Dalberg
13. Freiin Maria Elisabeth Augusta Ulner von Dieburg
3. Marie Louise Pelline von Dalberg
14. Antonio Giulio III Brignole-Sale, 9th Marquis of Groppoli
7. Marie Pellegrine Thérèse Brignole-Sale
15. Anna Maria Gaspara Vincenza Pieri-Serriciardi

== Notable quotations ==
- Power tends to corrupt, and absolute power corrupts absolutely.
- Great men are almost always bad men, even when they exercise influence and not authority.
- There is no worse heresy than that the office sanctifies the holder of it.
- History is the arbiter of controversy, the monarch of all she surveys.
- Universal History is ... not a burden on the memory but an illumination of the soul.
- There is not a more perilous or immoral habit of mind than the sanctifying of success. [said of Oliver Cromwell]
- The strong man with the dagger is followed by the weak man with the sponge.
- The science of politics is the one science that is deposited by the streams of history, like the grains of gold in the sand of a river; and the knowledge of the past, the record of truths revealed by experience, is eminently practical, as an instrument of action and a power that goes to making the future.
- Save for the wild force of Nature, nothing moves in this world that is not Greek in its origin.
- Liberty is not the power of doing what we like, but the right of being able to do what we ought.
- The wisdom of divine rule appears not in the perfection but in the improvement of the world... History is the true demonstration of Religion.

== Works ==
- The Civil War in America: Its Place in History (lecture; 1866).
- The Rise and Fall of the Mexican Empire (lecture; 1868).
- Letters from Rome on the Council (1870).
- The War of 1870 (lecture; 1871).
- The History of Freedom in Antiquity (address; 1877).
- The History of Freedom in Christianity (address; 1877).
- Introductory note to L.A. Burd's edition of Machiavelli's Il Principe (1891).
- A Lecture on the Study of History: delivered at Cambridge June 11, 1895. London: Macmillan and Co. 1895 – via Internet Archive.
- Introductory note to G.P. Gooch's Annals of Politics and Culture (1901).

Posthumous

- Letters of Lord Acton to Mary, Daughter of the Right Hon. W.E. Gladstone (1904).
- Lectures on Modern History (1906).
- The History of Freedom and Other Essays (1907).
- Historical Essays and Studies (1907).
- Figgis, John Neville; Laurence, Reginald Vere, eds. (1910). Lectures on the French Revolution. London: Macmillan and Co. – via Internet Archive.
- Figgis, John Neville; Laurence, Reginald Vere, eds. (1917). Selections from the Correspondence of the First Lord Acton. Vol. 1. London: Longmans, Green and Co. – via Internet Archive.

Articles

- "Mill on Liberty," Part II, The Rambler (1859–60).
- "The Roman Question," The Rambler (1860).
- "The State of the Church," The Rambler (1860).
- "Hefele's 'Life of Ximenes'," The Rambler (1860).
- "The Political System of the Popes," Part II, Part III, The Rambler (1860–61).
- "Döllinger's 'History of Christianity'," The Rambler (1861).
- "Notes on the Present State of Austria," The Rambler (1861).
- "Political Causes of the American Revolution," The Rambler (1861).
- "Cavour," The Rambler (1861).
- "The Catholic Academy," The Rambler (1861).
- "Döllinger on the Temporal Power," The Rambler (1861).
- "Mr. Goldwin Smith's Irish History," The Rambler (1862).
- "The Protestant Theory of Persecution," The Rambler (1862).
- "Nationality," Home and Foreign Review (1862).
- "Secret History of Charles II," Home and Foreign Review (1862).
- "Confessions of Frederick the Great," Home and Foreign Review (1863).
- "The Waldensian Forgeries," Home and Foreign Review (1863).
- "Ultramontanism," Home and Foreign Review (1863).
- "Mediæval Fables of the Popes," Home and Foreign Review (1863).
- "The Munich Congress," Home and Foreign Review (1864).
- "Conflicts with Rome," Home and Foreign Review (1864).
- "Material Resources of the Papacy," The Chronicle (1867).
- "Fra Paolo Sarpi," The Chronicle (1867).
- "The Case of Monte Cassino," The Chronicle (1867).
- "Döllinger on Universities," The Chronicle (1867).
- "The Ministerial Changes in Italy," The Chronicle (1867).
- "Secret History of the Italian Crisis," The Chronicle (1867).
- "The Secret Bull," The Chronicle (1867).
- "Reminiscences of Massimo d'Azeglio," The Chronicle (1867).
- "The Next General Council," The Chronicle (1867).
- "Ranke," The Chronicle (1867).
- "M. Littré on the Middle Ages," The Chronicle (1867).
- "Mr. Goldwin Smith on the Political History of England," The Chronicle (1867).
- "Nicholas of Cusa," The Chronicle (1867).
- "Maurice of Saxony," The Chronicle (1867).
- "The Acta Sanctorum," The Chronicle (1867).
- "The Queen's Journal," The Chronicle (1868).
- "Ozanam on the Fifth Century," The Chronicle (1868).
- "The Massacre of St. Bartholomew," The North British Review (1868).
- "The Pope and the Council," The North British Review (1869).
- "The Vatican Council," The North British Review (1870).
- "The Borgias and their Latest Historian," The North British Review (1871).
- "Wolsey and the Divorce of Henry VIII," Quarterly Review (1877).
- "Sir Erskine May's 'Democracy in Europe'," Quarterly Review (1878).
- "George Eliot's Life," The Nineteenth Century (1885).
- "German Schools of History," English Historical Review (1886).
- "Wilhelm von Giesebretch," English Historical Review (1890).
- "Döllinger's Historical Work," English Historical Review (1890).

== See also ==
- Acton Institute for the Study of Religion & Liberty

== Notes ==
Parliament of the United Kingdom
Preceded by John Alexander	Member of Parliament for Carlow; 1859–1865	Succeeded by Thomas Stock
Preceded by Henry Whitmore; John Pritchard	Member of Parliament for Bridgnorth; 1865–1866; With: John Pritchard	Succeeded by Henry Whitmore; John Pritchard
Peerage of the United Kingdom
New creation	Baron Acton; 1869–1902	Succeeded by Richard Lyon-Dalberg-Acton
Baronetage of England
Preceded by Ferdinand Dalberg-Acton	Baronet (of Aldenham); 1837–1902	Succeeded by Richard Lyon-Dalberg-Acton
Academic offices
Preceded by John Robert Seeley	Regius Professor of Modern History at the University of Cambridge; 1895–1902	Succeeded by J. B. Bury
