= Ludwig Eid =

German educator and historian

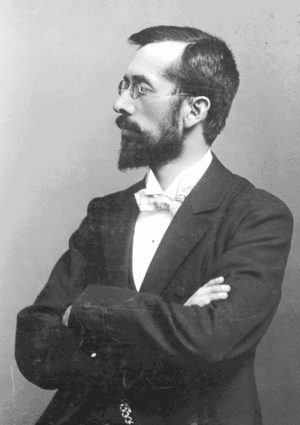
Ludwig Eid

Ludwig Eid (12 September 1865, in Obermoschel – 21 October 1936, in Munich) was a German educator and historian. He was the author of many works on Palatinate and Bavarian history.

In 1883–85 he attended the Catholic teacher training college in Speyer, and later worked as an instructor in Speyer (1888–91) and Blieskastel (1891–95). From 1895 to 1903 he worked as a Präparandenlehrer (doctoral teacher) in Rosenheim, where he founded a history museum (1895) and took charge of the city archives (since 1900). From 1903 to 1909 he was a doctoral teacher in the city of Eichstätt.

He furthered his education at the University of Heidelberg, taking classes in pedagogy, history and German language studies, and from 1909 to 1929, served as director of the Catholic teacher training college in Speyer.

== Selected works ==
- Zur Wirthschaftsgeschichte des pfälzischen Westrichs, (1894) – On the economic history of the Palatine Westrich.
- Der Hof- und Staatsdienst im ehemaligen Herzogtume Pfalz-Zweibrücken von 1444–1604, (1895) – The court and government services in the former Herzogtum Palatinate-Zweibrücken from 1444 to 1604.
- Marianne von der Leyen, geb. v. Dalberg, die "Große Reichsgräfin" des Westrichs, (1896) – Marianne von der Leyen, born von Dalberg, the "Great Countess" of Westrich.
- Wittelsbach auf Landsburg : ein Stück pfälzischer Geschichte, (1905) – Wittelsbach at Landsburg; a piece of Palatinate history.
- Aus Alt-Rosenheim : ausgewählte Studien zur Geschichte und Volkskunde für Rosenheim und sein Inntal, (1906) – Selected studies on the history and folklore of Rosenheim and the Bavarian Inntal.
- Die gelehrten Gesellschaften der Pfalz, (1925) – The learned societies of the Palatinate.
