= Dalberg =

German noble family

Coat of arms of the Dalberg family as rulers of the Grand Duchy of Frankfurt

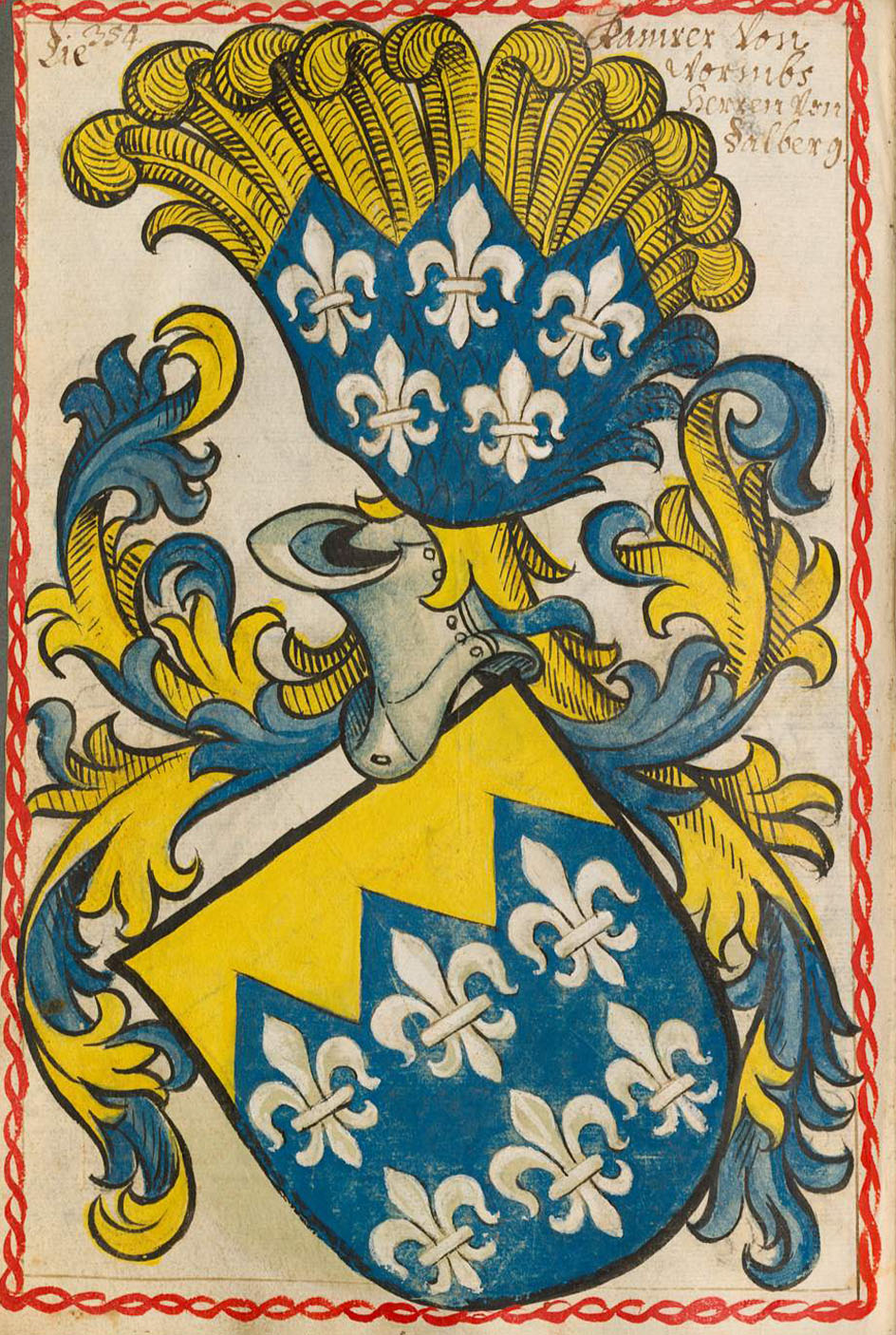
Earlier arms of the Dalberg family, from the Scheibler Armorial

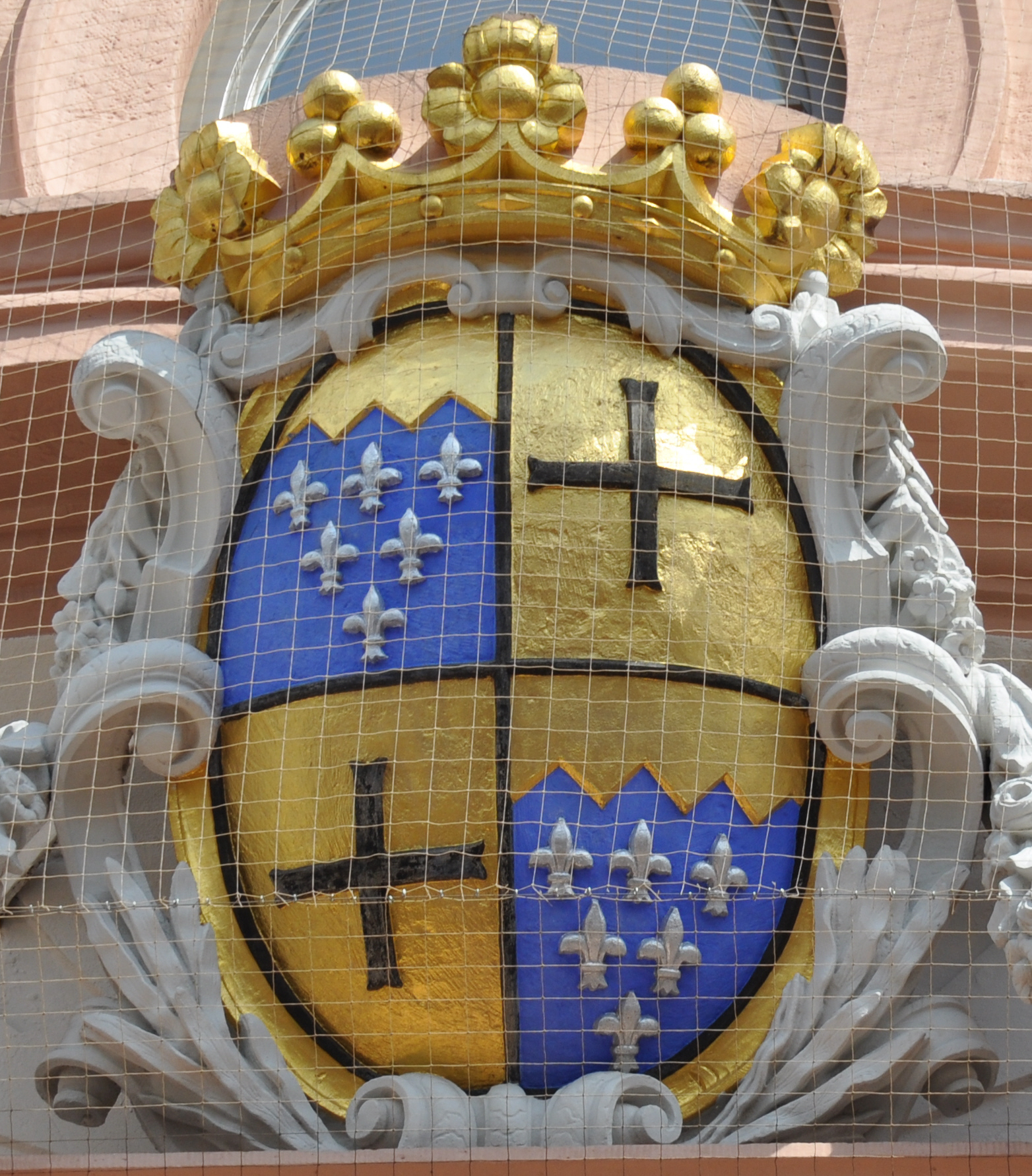
Later arms of the Dalberg family at the Jüngerer Dalberger Hof in Mainz

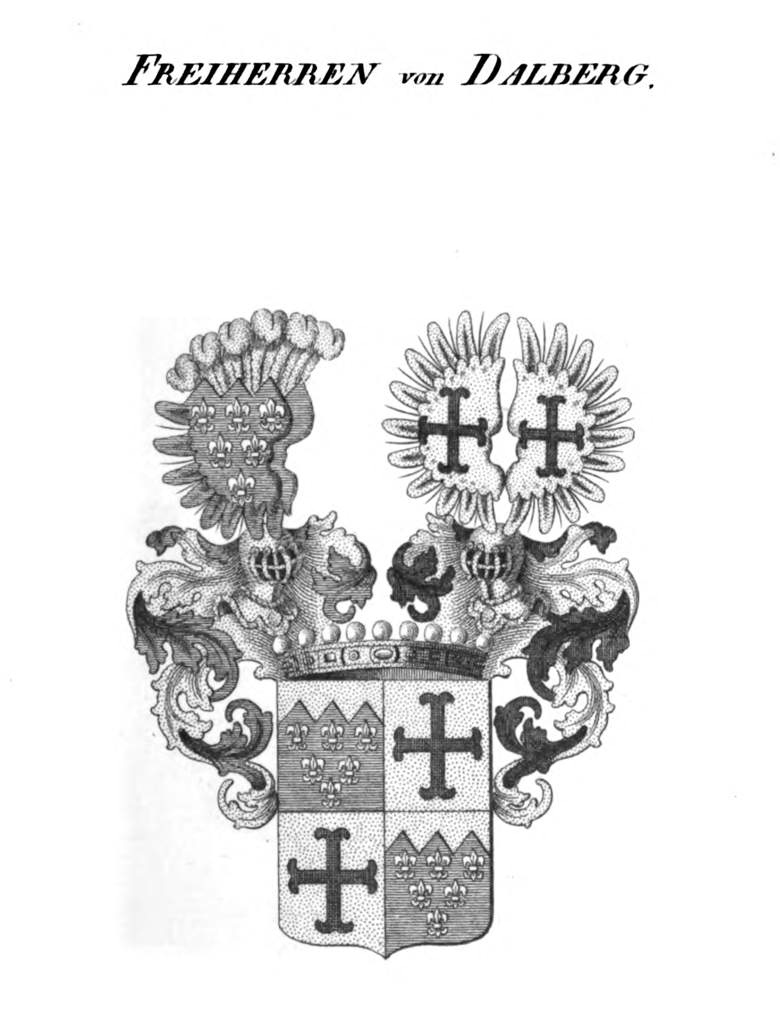
Arms of the Freiherren von Dalberg, mid 19th century

The House of Dalberg is the name of an ancient and distinguished German noble family, derived from the hamlet and castle (now in ruins) of Dalberg or Dalburg, near Kreuznach in Rhineland-Palatinate. They were the ruling family of the Grand Duchy of Frankfurt.

== History ==
In the 14th century, the original house of Dalberg became extinct in the male line, the fiefs passing to Johann Gerhard, chamberlain of the see of Worms, who married the heiress of his cousin, Anton of Dalberg, about 1330. His own family was of great antiquity, his ancestors having been hereditary ministerials of the bishop of Worms since the time of Ekbert the chamberlain, who founded in 1119 the Augustinian monastery of Frankenthal and died in 1132.

By the mid 15th century, the Dalberg family had grown to be of such importance that, in 1494, the German King Maximilian I granted them the honor of being the first to receive knighthood at the coronation, this part of the ceremonies being opened by the herald asking in a loud voice Ist kein Dalberg da? ("Is no Dalberg present?"). This picturesque privilege the family enjoyed until the end of the Holy Roman Empire. The elder line of the family of Dalberg-Dalberg became extinct in 1848, and the younger, that of Dalberg-Herrnsheim, in 1833. The male line of the Dalbergs is now represented only by the family of Hessloch, descended from Gerhard of Dalberg (c. 1239), which in 1809 succeeded to the title and estates in Moravia and Bohemia of the extinct counts of Ostein.

== Prominent family members ==
The following are noteworthy members of the family:

1. Johann von Dalberg (1445–1503), Chamberlain and afterwards bishop of Worms, son of Wolfgang von Dalberg. He studied at Erfurt and in Italy, where he took his degree of doctor utriusque juris at Ferrara and devoted himself more especially to the study of Greek. Returning to Germany, he became privy councillor to the elector palatine Philip, whom he assisted in bringing the University of Heidelberg to the height of its fame. He was instrumental in founding the first chair of Greek, which was filled by his friend Rudolph Agricola, and he also established the university library and a college for students of civil law. He was an ardent humanist, was president of the Sodalitas Celtica founded by the poet Konrad Celtes, and corresponded with many of the leading scholars of his day, to whom he showed himself a veritable Maecenas. He was employed also on various diplomatic missions by the emperor and the elector.
2. Marianne von der Leyen
3. Wolfgang von Dalberg (1538–1601), archbishop-elector of Mainz from 1582 to 1601.
4. Karl Theodor Anton Maria von Dalberg (1744–1817), archbishop-elector of Mainz, arch-chancellor of the Holy Roman Empire, and afterwards the only ever prince-primate of the Napoleonic Confederation of the Rhine and grand-duke of Frankfurt.
5. Wolfgang Heribert von Dalberg (1750–1806), brother of the above. He was intendant of the theatre at Mannheim, which he brought to a high state of excellence. His chief claim to remembrance is that it was he who first put Schiller's earlier dramas on the stage, and it is to him that the poet's Briefe an den Freiherrn von Dalberg ("Letters to the Baron of Dalberg", Karlsruhe, 1819) are addressed. He himself wrote several plays, including adaptations of Shakespeare. His brother, Johann Friedrich Hugo von Dalberg (1752–1812), canon of Trier, Worms and Speyer, had some vogue as a composer and writer on musical subjects.
6. Emmerich Joseph, duc de Dalberg (1773–1833), son of Wolfgang Heribert von Dalberg (above). He was born at Mainz on 30 May 1773. In 1803, he entered the service of Baden, which he represented as envoy in Paris. After the Treaty of Schönbrunn (1809), he entered the service of Napoleon, who created him a duke and councillor of state in 1810. He had from the first been on intimate terms with Talleyrand, and retired from the public service when the latter fell out of the emperor's favor. In 1814, he was a member of the provisional government by whom the Bourbon kings were recalled, and he attended the Congress of Vienna, with Talleyrand, as minister plenipotentiary. He appended his signature to the decree of outlawry launched in 1815 by the European powers against Napoleon. For this, his property in France was confiscated, but it was given back after the second Restoration, when he became a minister of state and a peer of France. In 1816, he was sent as ambassador to Turin. The latter years of his life he spent on his estates at Herrnsheim, where he died on 27 April 1833.
7. Friedrich Ferdinand von Dalberg (1822–1908), naturalist, estate owner and chamberlain

== Dalberg-Acton ==
Emmerich Joseph, duc de Dalberg, had inherited the family property of Herrnsheim from his uncle, the arch-chancellor Karl Theodor von Dalberg. This estate passed, through his daughter and heiress, Marie Louise Pelline de Dalberg, by her marriage with Sir Ferdinand Acton, 7th Baronet (who assumed the additional surname of Dalberg), to her son, the historian John Emerich Edward Dalberg-Acton, 1st Baron Acton.

== See also ==
- Baron Acton
- Dahlberg (surname)
