= Ferdinando Acton =

Italian naval officer, admiral and politician

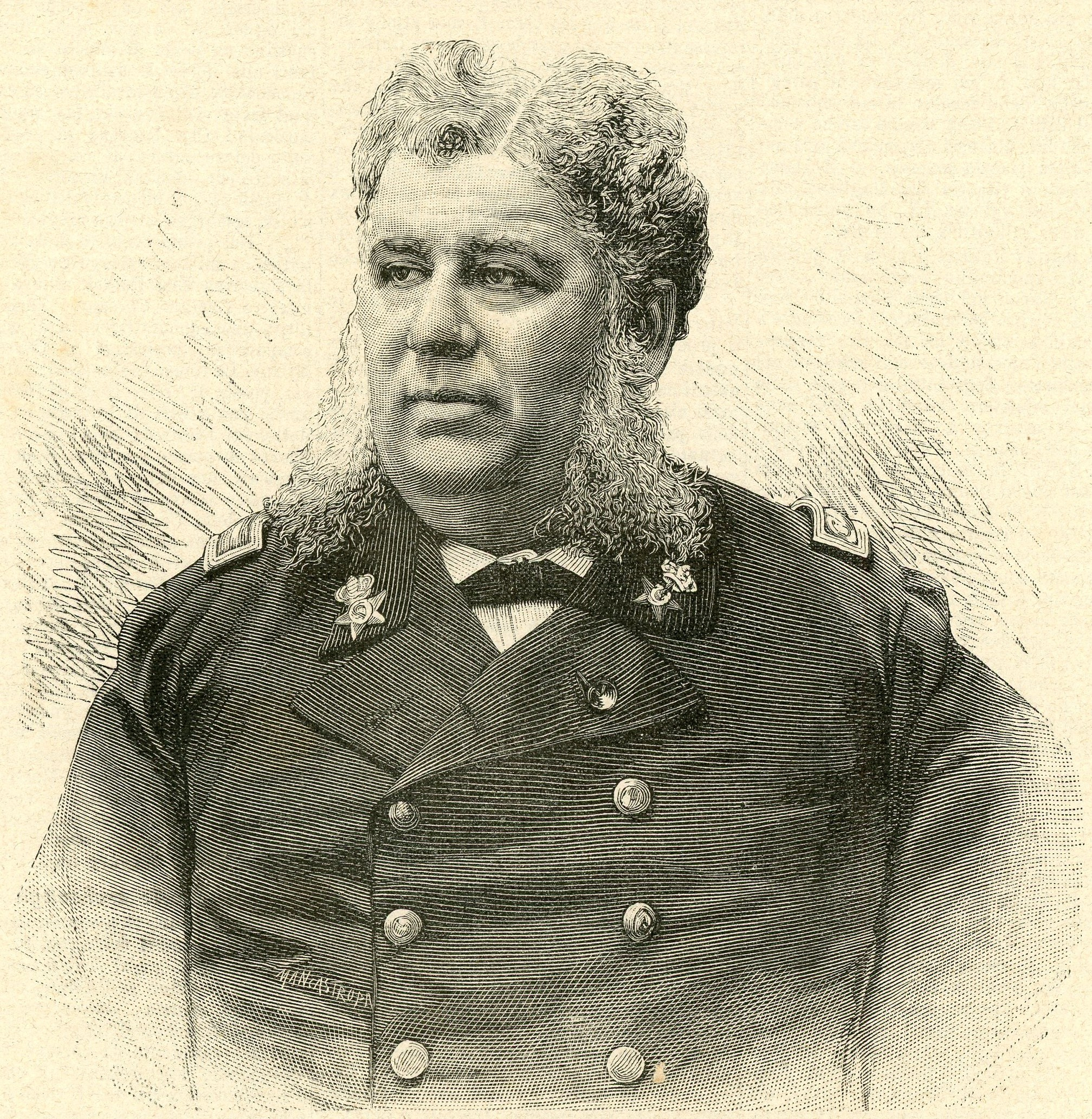

Minister of the Navy
- In office 1880–1883

Minister of War

Personal details
- Born: 16 July 1832 Naples, Kingdom of the Two Sicilies
- Died: 18 February 1891 (aged 58) Rome, Kingdom of Italy
- Children: Alfredo Acton
- Relatives: Guglielmo Acton (brother); Marco Minghetti (brother-in-law); Sir John Acton, 6th Baronet (great-uncle)

Ferdinando Acton (16 July 1832, in Naples – 18 February 1891, in Rome) was an Italian naval officer, admiral, and politician who served both as Minister of War and Minister of the Navy.

== Family ==
He was descended from a noble family which had originated in England before moving to Tuscany, and later the Kingdom of the Two Sicilies. He served in the Two Sicilies Real Marina ("Royal Navy"), then in the Regia Marina ("Royal Navy") of the unified Kingdom of Italy.

His grandfather was General Joseph Edward Acton (1737-1830), brother of Sir John Acton, 6th Baronet, commander of the naval forces of the Grand Duchy of Tuscany and prime minister of the Kingdom of Naples. His elder brother was Guglielmo Acton, who also was the Italian Minister of the Navy, and his son was Alfredo Acton, a Regia Marina admiral. His sister Laura remarried in 1864, marrying Marco Minghetti, then prime minister of Italy.

== Career ==
He was a midshipman in 1849 and reached the rank of lieutenant in 1857 in the Navy of the Kingdom of the Two Sicilies. In 1860 he commanded the Bourbon Aviso "Elettrico" which brought General Alessandro Nunziante to Sicily
Having transferred to the Royal Sardinian Navy in the same year, he took part in the Siege of Ancona (1860) as deputy chief of staff to Admiral Persano. Having entered the Italian navy in 1861 with the rank of frigate captain, he commanded the corvette "Etna" in the Third Italian War of Independence.

A member of parliament for the Amalfi constituency during the 10th and 11th legislatures (1867-74), he belonged to the right. Rear Admiral in 1877, he served as Secretary General in 1878, during the first Cairoli ministry, when Enrico Di Brocchetti was Minister of the Navy. He was appointed Minister of the Navy from November 1879 to November 1883 during the third Cairoli ministry and the fourth and fifth Depretis ministries. In July 1880 and February 1881, he also served as interim Minister of War. He was appointed Senator on 11 January 1880.

As Minister of the Navy, he advocated the use of small-tonnage battleships, within a large and fast fleet, in preference to large ships.
