= Alfredo Acton =

Italian military officer and politician (1867–1934)

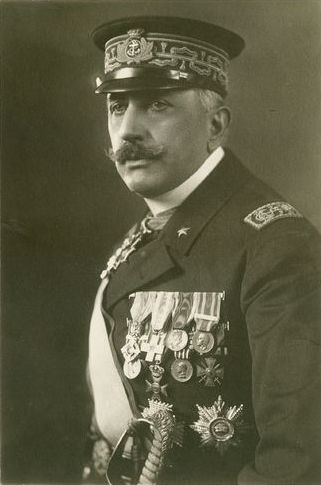
- Born: 12 September 1867
- Died: 26 March 1934
- Service / branch: Regia Marina

Alfredo Acton, 1st barone Acton (12 September 1867 – 26 March 1934) was an Italian admiral, politician and Chief of Staff of the Regia Marina (Italy's Royal Navy).

He was born in Castellammare di Stabia, a descendant of the Acton family which had originated in England before moving to Tuscany. His great-grandfather was General Joseph Edward Acton (1737–1830), brother of Sir John Acton, 6th Baronet, commander of the naval forces of the Grand Duchy of Tuscany and prime minister of the Kingdom of Naples. His father was Ferdinando Acton and his uncle Guglielmo Acton, both of whom served as Italian Minister of the Navy. His aunt Laura Acton was married to Marco Minghetti, prime minister of Italy.

Acton participated in the occupation of Massawa (1885), the intervention in the uprising on Crete by the International Squadron (1897–1898), the suppression of the Boxer Rebellion (1900), and the Italo-Turkish War (1912).

During the First World War, he became a rear admiral and was the Allied commander of an Italian-British-French force which fought the Battle of the Strait of Otranto against the Austrian-Hungarian Navy in 1917.

After the war, he was chief of staff of the Italian Navy in 1919–1921 and 1925–1927. He was named "Barone Acton" in 1925 and became a Senator in 1927. In 1907, October 23, he married in Naples Donna Livia Giudice Caracciolo (1878-1963) 11th Princess of Leporano, daughter of Don Giuseppe 4th Prince of Cellamare, 9th Prince of Villa and 9th Prince of Leporano Donna Giulia Brunas Serra from dukes of Cardinale.

In the United Kingdom, he was an honorary Knight Commander of the Order of the Bath (KCB). He was a bailiff of the Sovereign Military Order of Malta.

He died in Naples, aged 66.
