= Judith Todd =

Zimbabwean politician and political activist

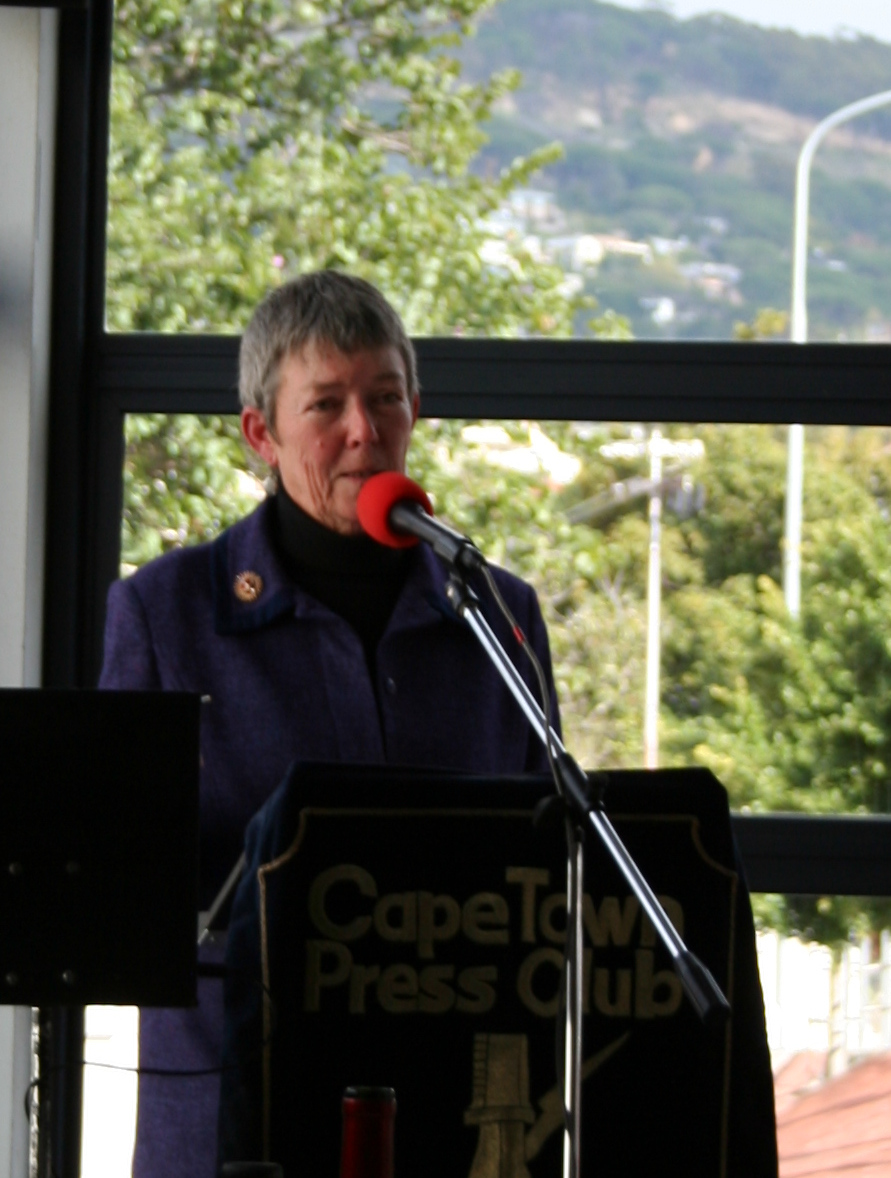
- Todd in 2007
- Born: March 18, 1943 (age 83); Dadaya Mission, Southern Rhodesia
- Occupations: Author; Political activist Journalist
- Years active: 1960–Present
- Known for: Activism in Zimbabwe
- Spouse: Richard Acton (m. 1974; div. 1984)

Judith Todd (born 18 March 1943) is a Zimbabwean-New Zealander political activist. She is the second daughter of Sir Garfield Todd, the former prime minister of Southern Rhodesia (1908–2002).

== Biography ==
Todd was born at Dadaya Mission in Southern Rhodesia. She was educated at Queen Elizabeth Girls School. Her missionary father, Reginald Stephen Garfield Todd, served as Prime Minister between 1953 and 1958. Her mother, Jean Grace Wilson Todd, designed and implemented the Southern Rhodesian African Educational System.

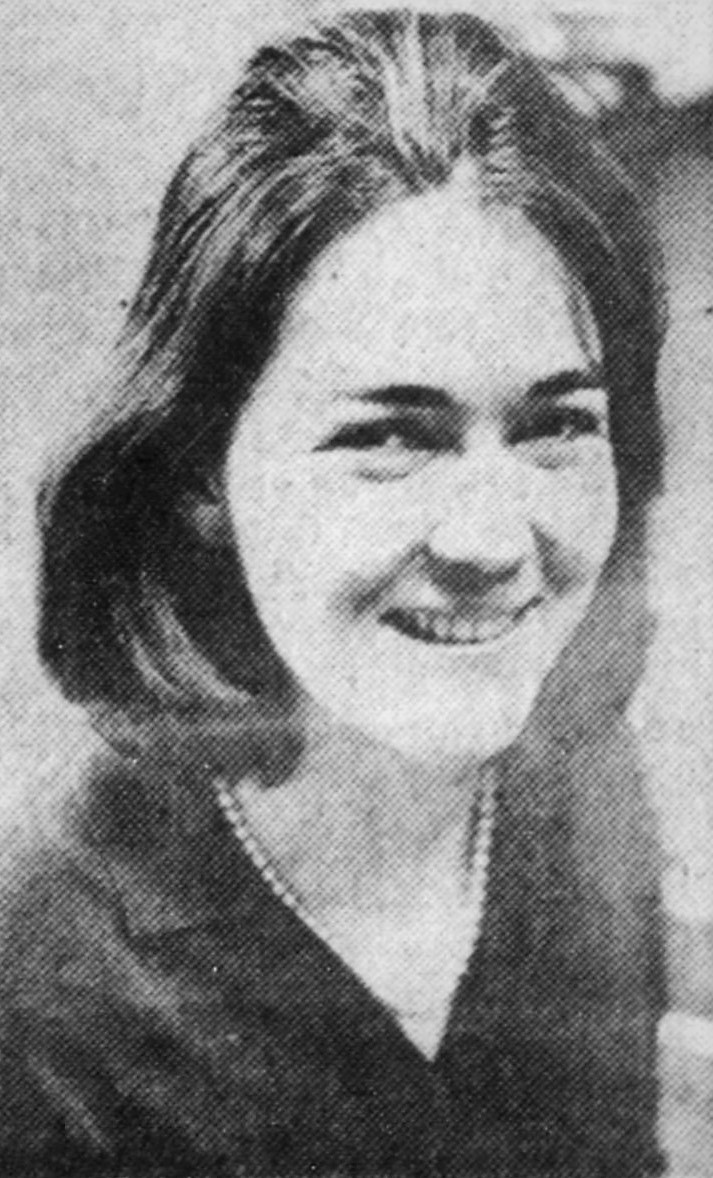
Todd in 1965

Todd was a political activist from the early 1960s when she joined the black nationalist movement by becoming a member of the National Democratic Party (NDP) which was formed in 1960. She later joined the Zimbabwe African People's Union after the NDP was banned by the government. She opposed the minority government of Ian Smith and campaigned internationally against the minority white rule in Rhodesia. In October 1964, she was arrested by Rhodesian authorities and was convicted. In January 1972, she was arrested again and sent to a jail in Marandellas. Her father was arrested at the same time and went to jail in Gatooma. During her imprisonment, she briefly went on hunger strike in protest against their detention, but relented after enduring several incidents of force-feeding. Several weeks later, both were released and were subsequently expelled from the country, becoming persona non grata.

She relocated to London. In 1978 she was among the founding members of Zimbabwe Project Trust, a humanitarian organization connected to the Roman Catholic Church. It was founded to help Zimbabwean refugees. Her exile lasted until all detentions were lifted in February 1980 under the process leading to the independence of Zimbabwe. The trust relocated from London to Zimbabwe and Todd was appointed director, a position she held until 1987. The trust's focus shifted to humanitarian aid, especially relocation and training of liberation war ex-combatants.

In 1984, Todd was raped by a senior officer in Mugabe's military, after she criticised the genocide of Ndebele civilians, the traditional opponents of Mugabe's own tribe. She became a strong critic of the regime of Robert Mugabe.

After an unsuccessful candidature for a seat in parliament for the Zimbabwe African People's Union (ZAPU) she worked as a journalist. She was a founding shareholder of the Daily News newspaper in 1999. The newspaper was banned in 2003. That same year, she was stripped of her Zimbabwean citizenship, when she was unable to comply with a court order to renounce her potential dual nationality because of her parents' birth in New Zealand.

As Todd had never had New Zealand nationality, she was unable to renounce it. The temporary passport she had been issued was not renewed and she became stateless for a decade, until the nationality law was changed in 2013 to allow Zimbabweans to be dual nationals.

She was married to Richard Acton from 1974 to 1984.

== Publications ==
- An Act of Treason: Rhodesia. Longman. 1965. ISBN 978-0-582-60969-3.
- Rhodesia. MacGibbon & Kee. 1966.
- The right to say no. Sidgwick & Jackson. 1972. ISBN 978-0-283-97916-3.
- Through the Darkness: A Life in Zimbabwe. Zebra. 2005. ISBN 978-1-77022-002-7.

== Sources ==
- Gates, Henry Louis Jr.; Akyeampong, Emmanuel; Niven, Steven J. (2012). Dictionary of African Biography. OUP USA. ISBN 978-0-19-538207-5.
