= Guglielmo Acton =

Italian naval officer, admiral and politician

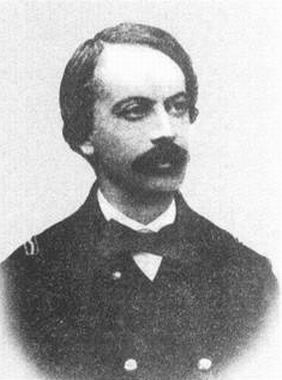
- Born: March 25, 1825; Castellammare di Stabia
- Died: November 29, 1896 (aged 71); Naples
- Occupations: naval officer, admiral, politician
- Known for: Minister of the Navy in the unified Kingdom of Italy

Guglielmo Acton (25 March 1825, in Castellammare di Stabia – 29 November 1896, in Naples) was an Italian naval officer, admiral and politician in the Kingdom of the Two Sicilies and then Minister of the Navy in the unified Kingdom of Italy from 1870 to 1871.

== Family ==
Serving in the Two Sicilies Real Marina ("Royal Navy") and the Italian Regia Marina ("Royal Navy"), he was descended from a noble family which had originated in England before moving to Tuscany, and then to the Kingdom of the Two Sicilies.

His grandfather was General Joseph Edward Acton (1737–1830), brother of Sir John Acton, 6th Baronet, commander of the naval forces of the Grand Duchy of Tuscany and prime minister of the Kingdom of Naples. His elder brother was Ferdinando Acton, who also served as the Italian Minister of the Navy, and his nephew was Alfredo Acton, a Regia Marina admiral. His sister Laura remarried in 1864, marrying Marco Minghetti, then prime minister of Italy.

== Career ==
A midshipman in the Two Sicilies Navy in 1841, he took part in the suppression of the Sicilian uprisings in 1849. A frigate captain in 1860, as second in command of the vessel Il Monarca (later Re Galantuomo), on the night of 14 August at Castellammare di Stabia, in the commander's absence, he repelled an attack by the Garibaldian steamship Tüköry. While leading the fight, he was wounded by a pistol shot fired from the enemy ship, but Tüköry was forced to abandon the attack.
Promoted to captain and transferred to the Royal Sardinian Navy, Acton participated in the blockade of Gaeta. In 1865-66, as commander of the frigate Principe Umberto, he conducted a brilliant campaign in South America and crossed the Strait of Magellan. Having learned on the return voyage of the declaration of war on Austria, he hurried back to Italy and joined the fleet on the eve of the Battle of Lissa (1866). This action earned him the Silver Medal for Military Valor.

He was promoted to Rear Admiral in 1868 and to Vice Admiral in 1879. He held very important positions on board and ashore. He was Minister of the Navy (15 January 1870 - 31 August 1871) in the Lanza cabinet, a member of Parliament and a Senator of the Kingdom from 15 November 1871.
