= Reginald Vere Laurence =

English historian (1876–1934)

R. Vere Laurence CVO
- Born: Reginald Vere Laurence; 13 July 1876
- Died: 17 October 1934 (aged 58)

Academic background
- Education: Merchant Taylors' School; Trinity College, Cambridge

Academic work
- Discipline: Historian
- Sub-discipline: Early modern Europe; French Revolution; Reformation
- Institutions: Trinity College, Cambridge
- Notable students: Prince Albert, Duke of York; Prince Henry, Duke of Gloucester

Reginald Vere Laurence CVO (13 July 1876 – 17 October 1934), sometimes credited as R. Vere Laurence, was an English historian, a Fellow and Dean of Trinity College, Cambridge.

== Biography ==
The son of Thomas French Laurence, of 8, St Charles Square, Notting Hill, London, Laurence was educated at Merchant Taylors' School (while it was still in central London) and admitted to Trinity College as a sizar in October 1895. In 1897 he became a scholar of the college, in 1898 a Lightfoot scholar, and in 1899 was awarded a Derby studentship and an Allen scholarship. In 1898 he graduated BA in the Historical Tripos with First Class Honours, then MA in 1902. He was a Fellow of Trinity from 1901 until his death in 1934, a College Lecturer in History from 1903, and Dean from 1908. In 1902 he became editor of the Cambridge Review.

A Fellow of Trinity College for thirty-four years, Laurence served successively as Lecturer, Tutor, Junior Bursar during the First World War, Senior Tutor, and finally as Dean of the College. In 1919–1920, while still Senior Tutor, he was the Director of Studies of the young Prince Albert, later King George VI, who spent a year at Trinity reading history following his war service, and also of his brother Prince Henry, later Duke of Gloucester. In 1920 this role resulted in Laurence being appointed a Commander of the Royal Victorian Order.

Among Laurence's published work, he wrote for the Cambridge Modern History and co-edited The History of Freedom, Lectures on the French Revolution, and Lectures and Essays of Lord Acton.

Laurence died unmarried in the college in 1934 and was entombed in the college chapel. A memorial to him in the chapel bears a long inscription in Latin written by his friend A. E. Housman, which praises his natural intelligence and his ability to bring the most difficult problems to successful outcomes, and describes him as a born historian and teacher, popular among students, and an agreeable companion.

== Selected publications ==
- Dalberg-Acton, John Emerich Edward (1907). Figgis, John Neville; Laurence, Reginald Vere (eds.). Historical Essays & Studies. London: MacMillan & Co. – via Internet Archive.
- The History of Freedom (ed.)
- Lectures on the French Revolution (ed.)
- "The Church and Reform", in Cambridge Modern History, Vol. II, The Reformation: The end of the Middle Ages (1903)
