= John Lyon-Dalberg-Acton, 3rd Baron Acton =

British peer and soldier

The Right Honourable The Lord Acton CMG MBE TD

Member of the House of Lords Lord Temporal
- In office 15 December 1928 – 23 January 1989; Hereditary Peerage
- Preceded by: The 2nd Lord Acton
- Succeeded by: The 4th Lord Acton

Personal details
- Born: 15 December 1907 Bordighera, Liguria, Italy
- Died: 23 January 1989 (aged 81) Mallorca, Spain
- Spouse: Daphne Strutt
- Children: 11
- Parent: Richard Lyon-Dalberg-Acton, 2nd Baron Acton (father)
- Education: Royal Military College, Sandhurst; Trinity College, Cambridge

John Emerich Henry Lyon-Dalberg-Acton, 3rd Baron Acton CMG MBE TD (born Dalberg-Acton; 15 December 1907 – 23 January 1989), was a British peer and soldier.

== Early life and education ==
Acton was born in Bordighera, Liguria, Italy, the eldest son and third of nine children born to Richard Dalberg-Acton, 2nd Baron Acton, a diplomat in the foreign service. His mother was Dorothy Lyon, the only child of Thomas Henry Lyon, DL, of Appleton Hall, Cheshire. The fourth generation of his family abroad, the 2nd Lord Acton and his children officially became British citizens in 1911 by Act of Parliament.

The family was living in Germany when the First World War broke out. They were temporarily detained in Baden Baden in 1914. In 1915, Lord Acton became chargé d'affaires in Bern. In 1919, his father added the additional surname and arms of Lyon when Lady Acton inherited from her father. His mother died in 1923, when his youngest sister was just 2.

He was educated at the Royal Military College, Sandhurst and Trinity College, Cambridge. He succeeded to the family titles upon the death of his father in 1924.

His only brother, Richard William Heribert Peter Lyon-Dalberg-Acton (1909–1946), was killed in a plane crash in Gambia in 1946.

== Honours ==
In December 1945, Acton was appointed to the Military Division of the Order of the British Empire as a Member. In February 1947, he was appointed to be a Deputy Lieutenant of the County of Salop but resigned his commission in November the same year because he stopped living in the county. In the 1964 New Year Honours, Acton was appointed to the Order of St Michael and St George as a Companion.

== Personal life ==
Acton was a devout Catholic. He was a founder and president of the multiracial National Club in Salisbury, Rhodesia.

== Family ==
He married Daphne Strutt (d. 2003), daughter of The 4th Baron Rayleigh, on 25 November 1931. The couple had eleven children:

- Pelline Margot Lyon-Dalberg-Acton (b. 24 December 1932)
- Charlotte Lyon-Dalberg-Acton (1934–1935)
- Catherine Lyon-Dalberg-Acton (b. 30 December 1939)
- Richard Lyon-Dalberg-Acton, 4th Baron Acton (30 July 1941 – 10 October 2010)
- John Charles Lyon-Dalberg-Acton (b. 26 January 1943 — d. 25 December 2016)
- Robert Peter Lyon-Dalberg-Acton (b. 23 June 1946)
- Jill Mary Joan Lyon-Dalberg-Acton (b. 15 June 1947)
- Professor Edward David Joseph Lyon-Dalberg-Acton (b. 4 February 1949)
- Peter Hedley Lyon-Dalberg-Acton (b. 27 March 1950)
- Mary Anne Lyon-Dalberg-Acton (b. 30 March 1951)
- Jane Lyon-Dalberg-Acton (b. 25 January 1954)

He died in Mallorca, Spain in 1989.

Peerage of the United Kingdom
Preceded by Richard Lyon-Dalberg-Acton	Baron Acton; 1924–1989	Succeeded by Richard Lyon-Dalberg-Acton
