= John Lyon-Dalberg-Acton, 5th Baron Acton =

British author and peer (born 1966)

John Charles Harold Ferdinand Lyon-Dalberg-Acton, 5th Baron Acton (born 19 August 1966), is a British author, writing under the name Johnny Acton, and peer.

Born in Oxford, Lyon-Dalberg-Acton was educated at Winchester College (1980–1983) and Balliol College, Oxford (1984–1989). He wrote and farmed in Gloucestershire, married Lucinda Percival in 1998 and became the 5th Baron Acton and 17th Marquess of Groppoli upon the death of his father in October 2010.

== Book list ==
- The Sausage Book: The Complete Guide to Making, Cooking and Eating (with Nick Sandler)
- The Branded Cookbook: 85 Recipes for the World's Favorite Food Brands (2009) (with Nick Sandler)
- Soup (with Nick Sandler)
- The Duchy Originals Cookbook (2007) (with Nick Sandler)
- Kings of Comedy: The Slapstick, The Funny Trick, The Master of Mime, The Double Act, The Matter of Fact, and The Classic One-Line (The 21st Century Guides Series) (2006)
- Origin of Everyday Things (2006) (with Tania Adams)
- Minted: The Story of the World's Money (2006)
- The Ideas Companion: Crafty Copyrights, Tricky Trademarks and Peerless Patents (A Think Book) (2006)
- Preserved (2004) (with Nick Sandler)
- The Man Who Touched the Sky (2002)
- Mushroom (2001) (with Nick Sandler)

Peerage of the United Kingdom
Preceded by Richard Lyon-Dalberg-Acton	Baron Acton; 2010–present	Incumbent; Heir presumptive: Hon. Robert Lyon-Dalberg-Acton
