= Charles Januarius Acton =

English Catholic cardinal

His Eminence Charles Acton
- Prefect of the Congregation for Indulgences and Relics
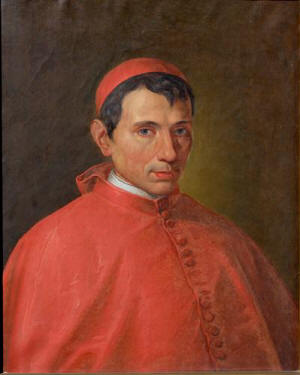
- Church: Roman Catholic Church
- Appointed: 22 December 1846
- Term ended: 23 June 1847
- Other posts: Cardinal-Priest of S. Marco (1846–47)
- Previous post: Cardinal-Priest of S. Maria della Pace (1842–46)

Orders
- Ordination: 1827
- Created cardinal: 18 February 1839 (in pectore) by Gregory XVI
- Rank: Cardinal-Priest

Personal details
- Born: Charles Januarius Edward Acton; 6 March 1803 Naples, Kingdom of Naples
- Died: 23 June 1847 (aged 44) Naples, Two Sicilies
- Buried: Vaults of Naples Cathedral
- Parents: Sir John Acton, Bt. and Mary Anne Acton (née Acton)
- Education: Westminster School
- Coat of arms: Charles Acton's coat of arms

Charles Januarius Edward Acton (6 March 1803 – 23 June 1847) was an English Roman Catholic prelate.

== Biography ==
Born in 1803 in Naples, he was the second son of Sir John Francis Acton, 6th Baronet. The family, a cadet branch of the Actons of Aldenham Park, near Bridgnorth, in Shropshire, had settled in Naples some time before his birth. His father was first minister of the Kingdom of Naples when he succeeded to the family estate and title through the death of his cousin, Sir Richard Acton, 5th Baronet. The future Cardinal's education was English, as he and his elder brother were sent to England on their father's death in 1811 to a school near London kept by the Abbé Auéqué. They were then sent to Westminster School, with the understanding that their religion was not to be interfered with. Yet, they not only were sent to this Protestant school, but they had a Protestant clergyman as tutor.

In 1819, they went on to Magdalene College, Cambridge. After this strange schooling for a future cardinal, Charles went to Rome when he was twenty and entered the Academy of Ecclesiastical Nobles (the current Academia Ecclesiastica), where ecclesiastics intending to be candidates for public offices receive a special training. An essay of his attracted the attention of the Secretary of State, della Somaglia, and Pope Leo XII made him a chamberlain and attaché to the Paris Nunciature, where he had the best opportunity to become acquainted with diplomacy.

Pope Pius VIII recalled him and named him vice-legate, granting him choice of any of the four legations over which cardinals presided. He chose Bologna as affording most opportunity for improvement. He left there at the close of Pius VIII's brief pontificate, and went to England, in 1829, to marry his sister to Sir Richard Throckmorton. Pope Gregory XVI made him assistant judge in the Civil Court of Rome. In 1837 he was made Auditor to the Apostolic Chamber, the highest Roman dignity after the cardinalate. Probably this was the first time it was even offered to a foreigner. Acton declined it, but was commanded to retain it. He was proclaimed Cardinal-Priest, with the title of Santa Maria della Pace, in 1842; having been created nearly three years previously. His strength, never very great, began to decline, and a severe attack of ague made him seek rest and recuperation, first at Palermo and then at Naples, but without avail, as he died in the latter city.

His judgment and legal ability were such that advocates of the first rank said that were they to know his view of a case they could tell how it would be decided. When he communicated anything in writing, Pope Gregory used to say he never had occasion to read it more than once. He was selected as interpreter in the interview which the Pope had with the Czar Nicholas I of Russia. The Cardinal never said anything about this except that when he had interpreted the Pope's first sentence the Czar said: "It will be agreeable to me, if your Eminence will act as my interpreter, also." After the conference Cardinal Acton, by request of the Pope, wrote out a minute account of it; but he never permitted it to be seen. The King of Naples urged him earnestly to become Archbishop of Naples, but he inexorably refused. His charities were unbounded. He once wrote from Naples that he actually tasted the distress which he sought to solace. He may be said to have died in the 'wealth' of willing poverty.

Catholic Church titles
Preceded by Giuseppe Antonio Sala	Cardinal Priest of Santa Maria della Pace; 1842–1846	Succeeded by Pierre Giraud
Preceded by Carlo Gaetano Gaisruck	Cardinal Priest of San Marco; 1846–1847	Succeeded by Giacomo Piccolomini
