= Friedrich Ferdinand von Dalberg =

Moravian noble, estate owner and naturalist

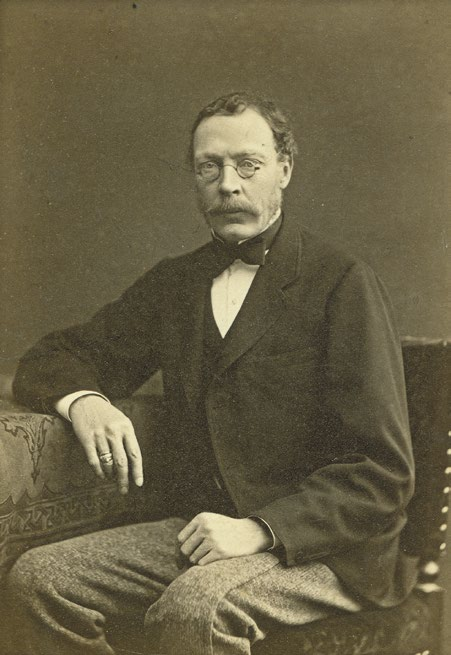

Baron Friedrich Ferdinand Egbert von Dalberg (9 December 1822 – 19 September 1908) was a Moravian nobleman and politician. Owner of the estates of Dačice and Malešov in Bohemia and Moravia, he was a member of the Austrian House of Lords and was a collector of natural history specimens. He attempted to put together a complete taxidermic collection of the birds of Europe in his family castle.

== Life and work ==
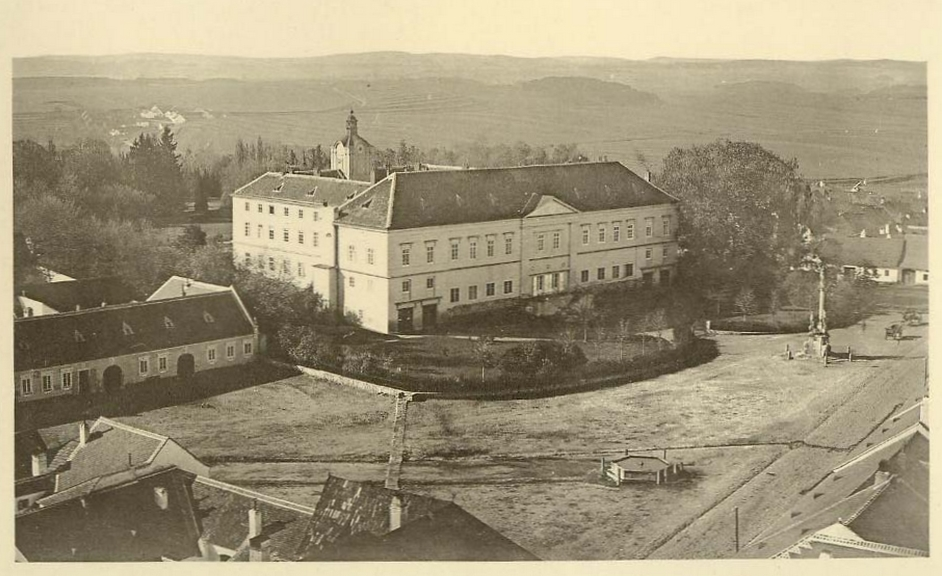
Dačice Castle in 1888

Von Dalberg was the only son of Baron Karl Anton Maximilian Dalberg and Baroness Charlotte née Sturmfelder von Oppenweiller (1791–1866). He was born on 9 December 1822 in Vienna. At the age of eight he shot an albino martin (Delichon urbica) which made him interested in natural history. His parents were interested in the plants on the estate grounds and they encouraged his interests. He studied philosophy at the University of Vienna and received a degree in law from the University of Würzburg. As a hereditary title bearer he was appointed chamberlain (of Worms) of the Holy Roman Empire in 1852. In 1859 he became heir to his father's estates in Bohemia and Moravia. The largest of these was Dačice covering 3475 hectares. He supported the conservative party he briefly served as the representatives of the landed gentry in the Moravian Provincial Assembly. From 1881 he was a hereditary member of the Austrian House of Lords.

Von Dalberg's bird collections grew with specimens from Bohemia and Moravia and in 1923 the catalogue listed 1021 specimens of 433 species. Apart from those that he collected or received from friends, he also acquired specimens from much further away through other sources including the Viennese taxidermists, the Hodek brothers and Johann Dorfinger, who worked for him. His sons Karl Herbert (1849–1920) and Friedrich Egbert (1863–1914) were also involved in growing the collection. The collection also included minerals and butterflies.

Von Dalberg married Kunigunde Vittinghoff-Schell zu Schellenberg (1827–1892) in 1846 and they had 8 children. Towards the end of his life he became blind and died at home and was buried within the castle cemetery. His son Friedrich Egbert donated the bird collections to the Muzeum Vysočiny Jihlava in 1909.
