= Wolfgang Heribert von Dalberg =

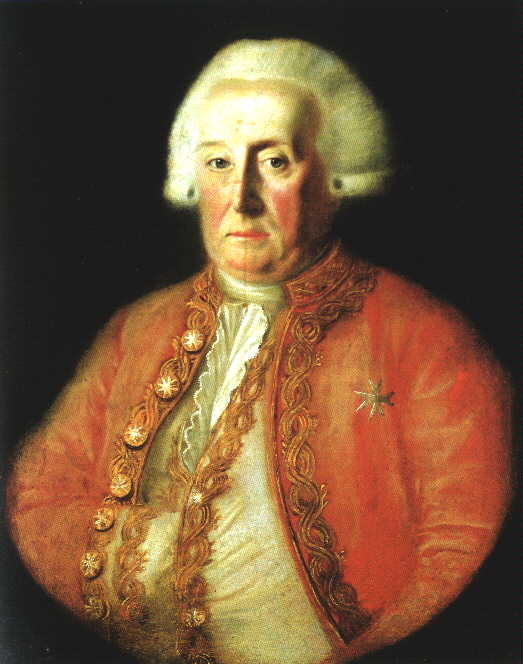
Wolfgang Heribert von Dalberg

Wolfgang Heribert Kämmerer von Worms Freiherr von Dalberg (born 18 November 1750 in Worms-Herrnsheim, died 27 September 1806 in Mannheim) was a courtier and statesman of Baden, who served as Minister of State and Grand Master of the Household. He was also the first general administrator of the Mannheim National Theatre.

== Early life and ancestry ==
He was a member of the prominent House of Dalberg and brother of Karl Theodor von Dalberg, the Arch-Chancellor of the Holy Roman Empire and Marianne von der Leyen, regent of the County of Hohengeroldseck.

== Personal life ==
He was married to Elisabeth Augusta Ulner von Dieburg (1751-1816). They were parents of Emmerich Joseph von Dalberg, who became a French diplomat and was granted the French title of Duke of Dalberg in 1810.
