= Ferdinand Dalberg-Acton =

British baronet

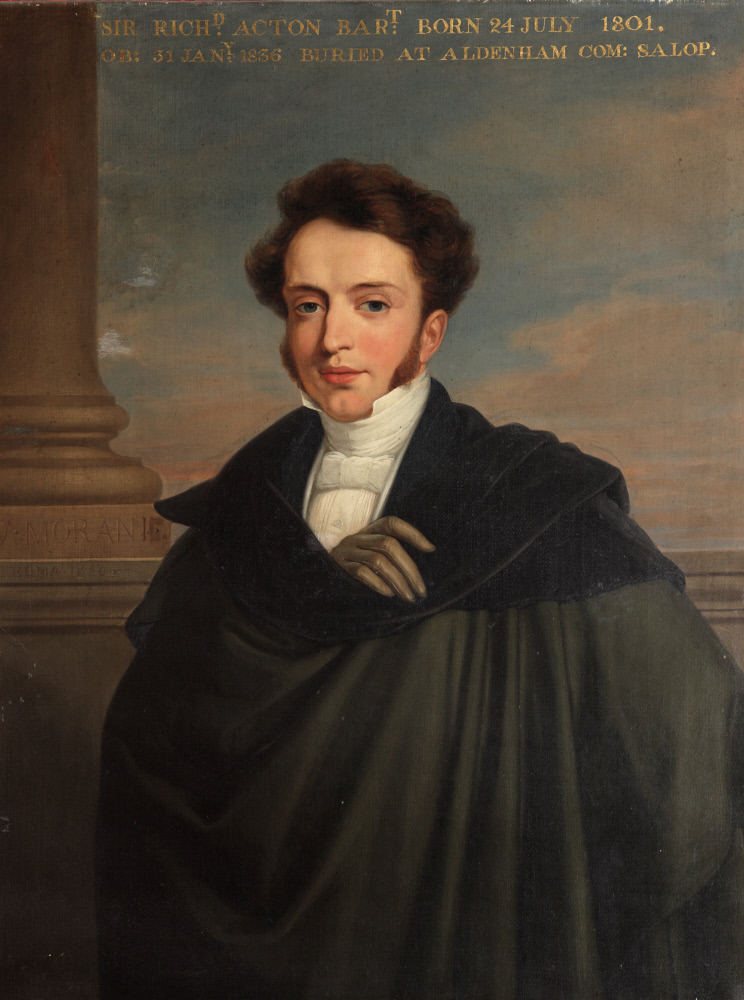
Sir Richard Acton, 7th Bt

Sir Ferdinand Richard Edward Dalberg-Acton, 7th Baronet (24 July 1801 – 31 January 1837) was a British baronet.

Named in honour of the King of Naples, he was known as Richard to friends and family. He was born in Palermo where his father, Sir John Acton, 6th Baronet, a former Prime Minister of Naples, had been forced to flee in 1806. His mother Mary Ann was the eldest daughter of his father's brother, General Joseph Edward Acton. He succeeded to the baronetcy upon the death of his father in 1811. He was educated at Westminster School and Magdalene College, Cambridge.

In 1826 the Villa Pignatelli was built for him in Naples, a neo-classical residence that formed the centrepiece of a park.

On 9 July 1832 he married Marie Louise Pelina von Dalberg, only surviving child of Emmerich Joseph, duc de Dalberg; they had one child, John Emerich Edward Dalberg-Acton, 1st Baron Acton (1834–1902).

Photograph of Marie Louise Pelline von Dalberg (1813-1860)

Baptised Ferdinand Richard Edward Acton, on 20 December 1833 his name was legally changed to Ferdinand Richard Edward Dalberg-Acton by Royal Licence.

On 23 January 1837 Sir Richard and his friend Lord Augustus Loftus attended a party at the Tuileries Palace. According to Loftus it was very hot indoors amidst the crush of guests and he and Sir Richard lost their carriages, servants and coats, each catching a violent cold from walking 'some distance' in the cold to look for a carriage. Sir Richard, at his wife's behest, was treated by Dr. Scudéry, a homeopathic doctor, who dosed him with causticum, and Sir Richard's health improved enough for him to dine in town. Thereafter Sir Richard's fever worsened; he was dosed with nux vomica (strychnine) and aconite (wolf's bane) and died at 2am on 30 January 1837.

His funeral was held at the church of St Thomas Aquinas in Paris. By 11am 600 mourners had gathered outside the house where he died and "When the funeral procession left the Hotel de Mortemart to proceed to the church of St. Thomas, all the company followed on foot the funeral car, immediately after which walked - first, the family of the deceased, then the Ambassadors of Russia, Austria, and Prussia, and most of the members of the corps diplomatique. The King, who with the rest of his family had always honoured the Chevalier Acton with the most marked attention, sent one of his aides-de-camp to represent him at this mournful ceremony." His body was subsequently conveyed to Aldenham, in Shropshire, and interred in the family vault.

Baronetage of England
Preceded by John Acton	Baronet (of Aldenham); 1811–1837	Succeeded by John Dalberg-Acton
