= Richard Lyon-Dalberg-Acton, 2nd Baron Acton =

British Peer, diplomat

The Right Honourable The Lord Acton KCVO JP DL
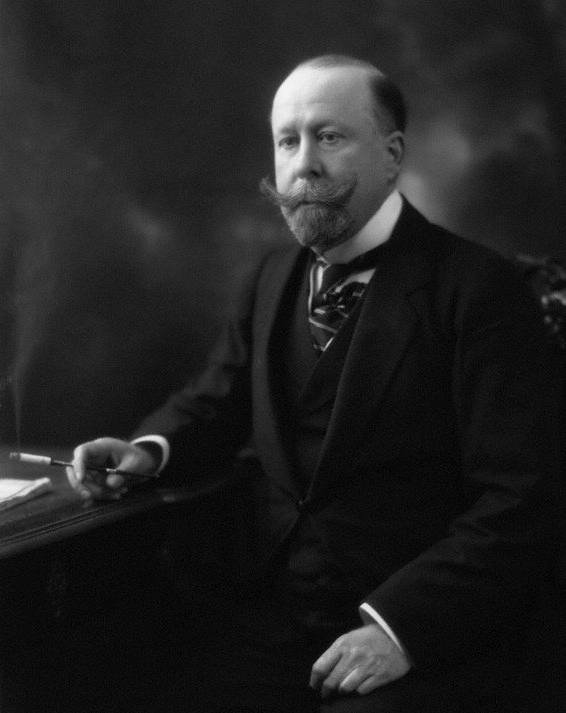
- Richard, Lord Acton, in 1922

United Kingdom Ambassador to Finland
- In office 1919–1920
- Prime Minister: David Lloyd George
- Preceded by: Coleridge Kennard
- Succeeded by: George Jardine Kidston

Personal details
- Born: Richard Maximilian Dalberg-Acton; 7 August 1870 Bavaria, German Empire
- Died: 16 June 1924 (aged 53) Knightsbridge, London, England
- Party: Liberal
- Spouse: Dorothy Lyon (m. 1904; died 1923)
- Children: 9
- Parent: John Dalberg-Acton, 1st Baron Acton (father)
- Occupation: Diplomat, politician

Richard Maximilian Lyon-Dalberg-Acton, 2nd Baron Acton, KCVO, JP, DL (7 August 1870 – 16 June 1924) was a British peer and diplomat, ultimately Britain's first Ambassador to Finland in 1919–20.

== Early life ==
The scion of an ancient and distinguished Shropshire family, Dalberg-Acton was born in Bavaria, in the then German Empire. He was the first and only surviving son of the 1st Baron Acton, a historian and politician, and his German wife, Marie Anna Ludomilla Euphrosina Gräfin von Arco auf Valley. He completed his education in England at Magdalen College, Oxford.

== Diplomatic career ==
Dalberg-Acton entered the British Foreign Office in 1894. He began a career in Europe as Third Secretary in the Diplomatic Service at the British Embassy in Berlin in 1896. He was promoted Second Secretary in 1900 and served in the Berlin embassy until 1902, also the year he succeeded to his father's peerage.

The 2nd Lord Acton then served as Second Secretary at successive embassies, in Vienna from August 1902; then Berne, Switzerland; Madrid in 1906–07, and The Hague.

In 1911 he was promoted First Secretary, in which grade he was charge d'affaires at Darmstadt and Karlsruhe in Germany until the outbreak of the First World War in 1914. He served again in Switzerland as Counsellor of Embassy at Berne in 1915–16, and became Consul-General in Zürich in 1917. In 1919 he became the first British Ambassador in recently independent Finland at Helsinki, then retired from the Foreign Office in 1920.

== Government posts ==
Alongside his diplomatic career, Lord Acton, a Liberal peer, was a Lord-in-waiting, from 1905 to 1915, to Kings Edward VII and George V under the Liberal administrations of Sir Henry Campbell-Bannerman and H. H. Asquith.

== Family ==
Lord Acton's Nationality Act 1911
- Act of Parliament
- Parliament of the United Kingdom
- Long title: An Act to remove doubts as to the nationality of Richard Maximilian Baron Acton and his issue.
- Citation: 1 & 2 Geo. 5. c. 2

Dates
- Royal assent: 16 December 1911

The fourth generation of his family to have been born abroad, he was, despite his paternal English roots and service to the British government, not formally a British subject until he was naturalised by Act of Parliament in 1911.

In 1919, he assumed by royal licence the additional surname of Lyon.

He married Dorothy Lyon, daughter of Thomas Henry Lyon, of Appleton Hall, DL, on 7 June 1904. The couple had nine children:

- Marie Immaculée Antoinette Lyon-Dalberg-Acton (1905–1994) married John Douglas Woodruff.
- Dorothy Elizabeth Anne Pelline Lyon-Dalberg-Acton (1906–1998) married Joseph Edward Eyre and had issue.
- John Emerich Henry Lyon-Dalberg-Acton, 3rd Baron Acton (1907–1989)
- Richard William Heribert Peter Lyon-Dalberg-Acton MBE (1909–1946) married Jill Ehlert; killed with wife in air crash in Gambia
- Helen Mary Grace Lyon-Dalberg-Acton (1910–2001) married Prince Guglielmo Rospigliosi and had issue.
- Gabrielle Marie Leopoldine Lyon-Dalberg-Acton (1912–1930)
- Joan Henrica Josepha Mary Clare Lyon-Dalberg-Acton (1915–1995)
- Margaret Mary Teresa Lyon-Dalberg-Acton (1919–1997)
- Ædgyth Bertha Milburg Mary Antonia Frances Lyon-Dalberg-Acton OBE (1920–1995) married John Alexander Callinicos and had issue; her son Alex Callinicos is a Marxist political theorist and activist.

Lady Acton died in 1923 and Lord Acton died the following year, leaving nine children between 18 and 3 years of age.

== Honours ==
Acton was appointed to the Royal Victorian Order as a Member (fourth class) in 1901. He was promoted to be a Knight Commander of the same order in the 1916 New Year Honours.

He was also invested with the 1st class Order of the Crown of Prussia, as a Grand Officer of the French Legion of Honour, a Grand Cross of the Danish Order of the Dannebrog, and the Serbian Royal Red Cross.

Diplomatic posts
| Preceded by Coleridge Kennard as Chargé d'Affaires | British Ambassador to Finland; 1919–1920 | Succeeded by George Jardine Kidston |
Peerage of the United Kingdom
| Preceded by John Dalberg-Acton | Baron Acton; 1902–1924 | Succeeded by John Lyon-Dalberg-Acton |
