= Emmerich Joseph de Dalberg =

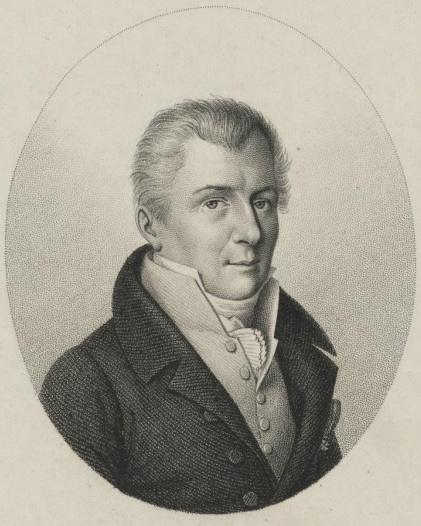
- 1815 portrait
- Born: 31 May 1773; Mainz, Electorate of Mainz
- Died: 27 April 1833 (aged 59); Schloss Herrnsheim near Worms, Germany
- Occupations: Diplomat, politician
- Parent(s): Wolfgang Heribert von Dalberg; Elisabeth Augusta Ulner von Dieburg

Emmerich Joseph Wolfgang Heribert de Dalberg, 1st Duke of Dalberg (31 May 1773 – 27 April 1833) was a German diplomat who was elevated to the French nobility in the Napoleonic era and who held senior government positions during the Bourbon Restoration.

== Early career ==
Emmerich Joseph Wolfgang Heribert von Dalberg was born in Mainz, then capital of the Electorate of Mainz, on 31 May 1773. He was the son of Wolfgang Heribert von Dalberg, a statesman of Baden, and his wife, Elisabeth Augusta Ulner von Dieburg (1751-1816). Emmerich was the nephew of Karl Theodor von Dalberg, arch-chancellor of the Holy Roman Empire, Prince primate of the Confederation of the Rhine and Grand-Duke of Frankfurt. His family meant him to pursue a clerical career, and he studied at the University of Göttingen in Lower Saxony.

Dalberg was at Vienna in the Imperial Chancellery when the stance of his uncle, who had taken the French side, ended his diplomatic career with the Austrian court. He was then named Councillor to the King of Bavaria. After the Treaty of Lunéville (9 February 1801) between the French Republic and Francis II, Holy Roman Emperor, he was accredited to Paris as minister of the Margrave of Baden. He negotiated the marriage of the young Charles, Grand Duke of Baden, with Princess Stéphanie de Beauharnais, niece of the Empress Josephine. Talleyrand befriended him and arranged for him to marry Mlle. de Brignoles, one of the ladies of the Empress.

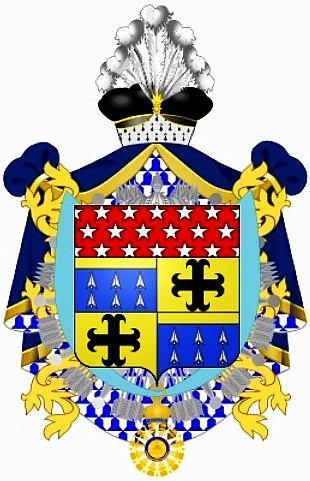
Heraldic achievement of Emmerich-Joseph de Dalberg, Duke of Dalberg, with the insignia of Grand Cross of the Order of the Reunion

After the Treaty of Vienna in 1809, Dalberg was naturalized as a French citizen and charged with negotiating Napoleon's marriage with Marie Louise of Austria. On 14 April 1810, he was created a duke of the Empire as duc de Dalberg. He was made a Councilor of State on 14 October 1810, with a large endowment. When Talleyrand was disgraced, he also fell from favor.

== Bourbon Restoration ==
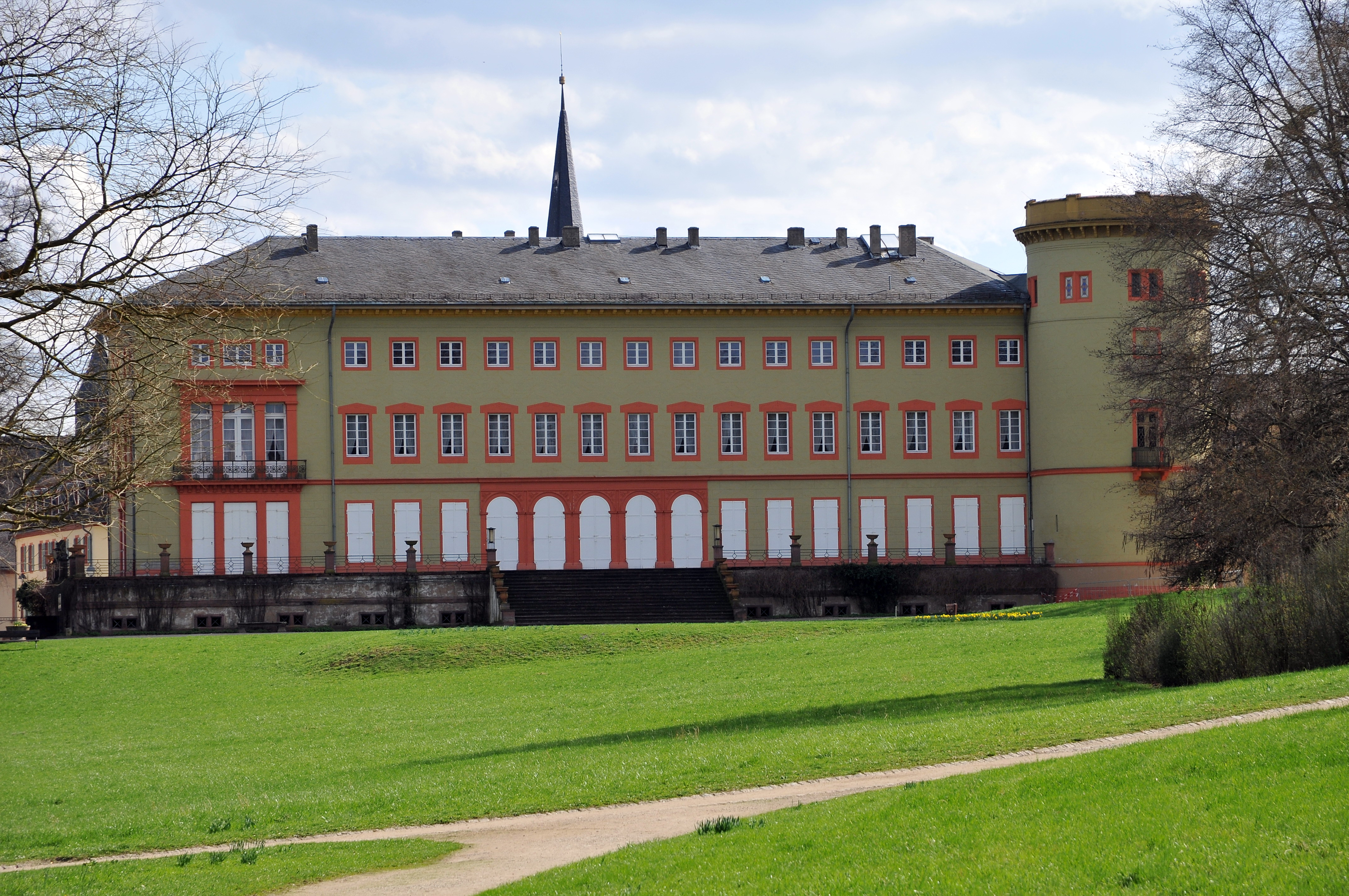
Schloss Herrnsheim

After Napoleon was defeated, Dalberg and Talleyrand both joined the French provisional government of 1814, and both assisted at the Congress of Vienna. On 22 July 1814, King Louis XVIII gave Dalberg the Grand Cordon of the Legion of Honour.

Dalberg left France during the Hundred Days, when Napoleon returned from exile, and he returned after the second Bourbon Restoration. On 17 August 1815, he was made a Peer of France and Minister of State. On 26 January 1816, he was appointed ambassador to Turin. In the chamber of peers, he showed himself in favor of the Charter of 1814.

Towards the end of the Restoration, he retired to his castle, Schloss Herrnsheim, where he died on 27 April 1833. His daughter, Marie Louise von Dalberg (1813–1860), married Sir Ferdinand Acton, 7th Baronet, who assumed the additional surname of Dalberg. After Sir Ferdinand's death in 1837, she married Granville Leveson-Gower (who became the 2nd Earl Granville in 1846).

== Works ==
- Remarques sur les émigrés et leurs droits à l'occasion de leur bannissement de nos provinces
- Documents historiques sur la mort du duc d'Enghien
- Considérations sur le projet d'une alliance entre l'Autriche et la Suisse (unpublished)
- Mémoire sur le Palatinat (unpublished)
