= Sir John Acton, 6th Baronet =

British naval officer and politician (1736–1811)

Sir John Acton Bt
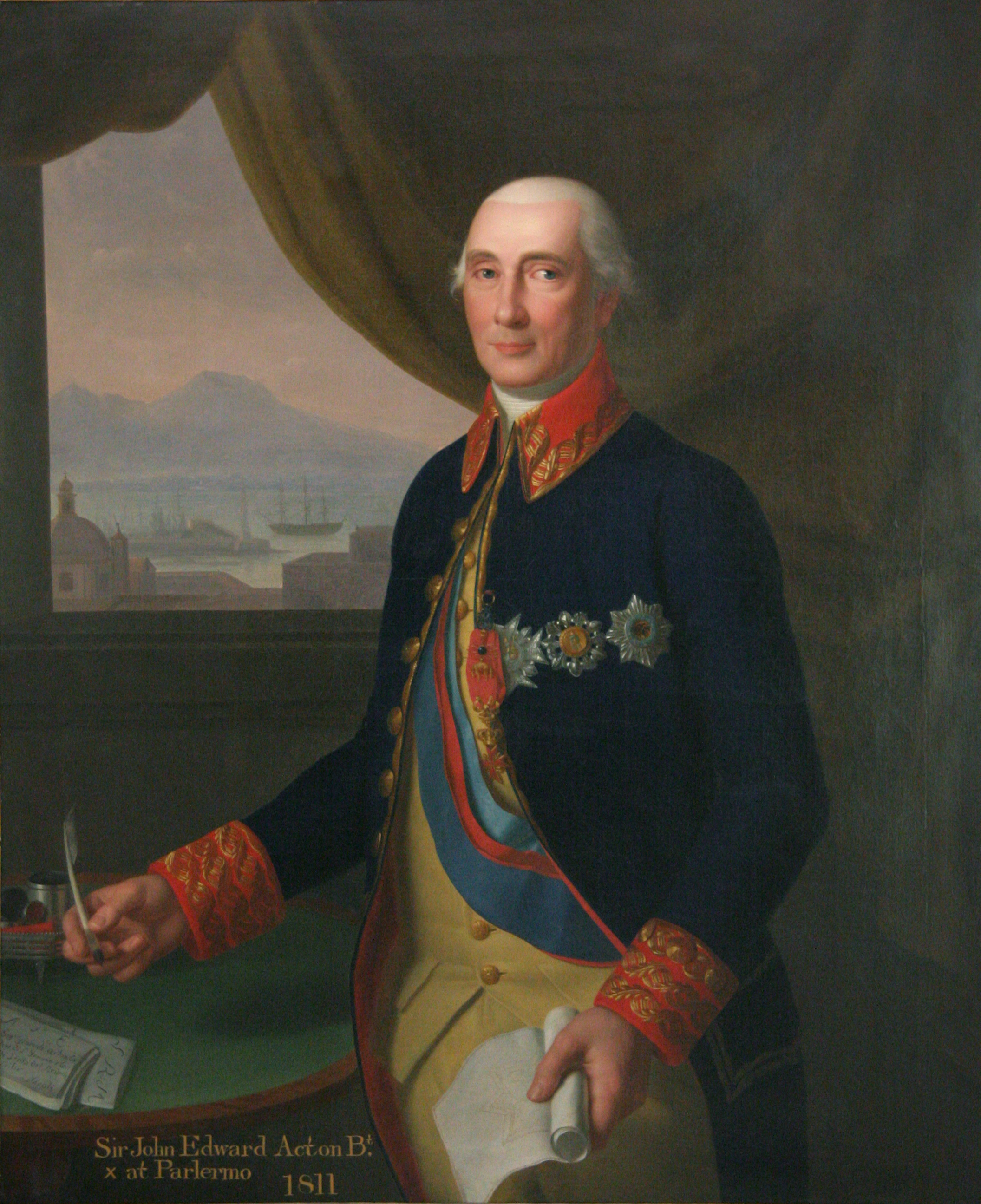
- Portrait attributed to Emanuele Napoli, 1802
- Born: 3 June 1736; Besançon, Doubs
- Died: 12 August 1811 (aged 75); Palermo, Sicily
- Burial place: Santa Ninfa dei Crociferi
- Spouse(s): Mary Ann Acton
- Military career
- Allegiance: Tuscany; Naples
- Branch: Tuscan Navy; Neapolitan Navy
- Rank: Admiral (Tuscan Navy)
- Conflicts: Invasion of Algiers (1775); French Revolutionary and Napoleonic Wars

Admiral Sir John Francis Edward Acton, 6th Baronet (3 June 1736 – 12 August 1811) was a British naval officer and politician who served in the Tuscan and Neapolitan navies. He also served as Prime Minister of Naples and Sicily under Ferdinand IV. Acton served Naples during the turbulent times when French Revolutionary Army under Napoleon was sweeping across Europe and threatening to extinguish the monarchy he served.

== Early life ==
Acton's coat of arms

John Acton was born on 3 June 1736 in Besançon, Doubs, the son of Edward Acton, an English physician who had settled in the town. Acton was the great-grandson of Sir Walter Acton, 2nd Baronet. In 1791, aged 55, John succeeded his second cousin once removed as 6th Acton baronet.

== Career ==
=== Service in Tuscany ===
Acton followed his uncle and joined the navy of the Grand Duchy of Tuscany, serving under him. In 1773, he was captaining the Tuscan frigate Austria off Tetouan when Acton was informed that two Algerian xebecs and five Salé Rovers were about to go on a piratical cruise in the Mediterranean. On 14 October, Austria encountered a 24-gun Salé Rover near Cape Spartel and captured her along with all 80 of the ship's surviving crew. Acton then ordered his crew to engage a second Salé Rover which ran aground near Algiers. While waiting for an opportune moment to destroy the grounded vessel, Austria was attacked by another Salé Rover and two xebecs, though the Tuscans drove the attacking Salé Rover ashore and destroyed her after a short chase. Acton then attempted to capture one xebec, but she managed to escape to Larache, ending the engagement; Acton later discovered the xebecs and Salé Rovers were all part of one squadron that had left Larache to capture Austria, which had suffered no casualties.

In July 1775, Acton, now at the rank of admiral, commanded the Tuscan contingent of the Spanish-Tuscan invasion of Algiers under Spanish General Alejandro O'Reilly. On 9 July, the Spanish landed two waves of troops on the Algerian coastline, which initially met with little resistance as the Algerians drew the Spaniards further inland through a feigned retreat. The Algerian defenders eventually drew the Spanish into a trap and ambushed them, inflicting heavy casualties on the Spaniards and driving them back to the shoreline. English travel writer Henry Swinburne wrote that the Spanish would have been "broken and slaughtered to a man... had not Mr. Acton, the Tuscan commander, cut his cables and let his ships drive in to shore just as the enemy was coming on us full gallop. The incessant fire of his great guns, loaded with grape-shot, not only stop't them in their career but obliged them to retire with great loss." The invaders proceeded to withdraw.

=== Service in Naples ===
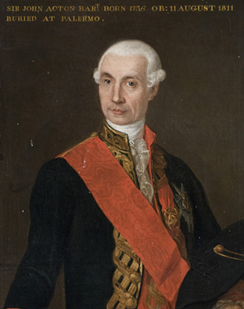
Portrait of Acton attributed to Giovanni Griffoni

In 1779, Maria Carolina of Naples persuaded her brother Leopold of Tuscany to allow Acton, who had been recommended to her by Francesco d'Aquino, Prince of Caramanico, to undertake the reorganisation of the Neapolitan Navy. The ability displayed by him in this led to his rapid advancement. He became commander-in-chief of both the Neapolitan army and the navy, minister of finance, and finally prime minister. His policy, devised in concert with Sir William Hamilton, the British ambassador to Naples, aimed at removing Spanish influence from Naples and replacing it with that of Great Britain and Austria. The policy led to open opposition to France and the French party in Italy.

The Neapolitan navy, which when Acton entered the service of Naples had been practically non-existent, he had built up by 1798 to 120 ships with 1,200 cannon, while the land forces had increased fourfold from 15 to 60 thousand. Unfortunately in no degree were the interests of Naples promoted by the vainglorious policy thus inaugurated, which speedily resulted in disaster. Although Acton had aimed to extend the commerce of the country by increasing the facilities of internal communication and restoring some of the principal ports, the increased taxation required to support the army and navy more than counter-balanced these efforts and caused acute distress and general discontent. The introduction of foreign officers into the services, which had aroused the resentment of the upper classes, was further augmented when the fleet was placed under the orders of the British Admiral Horatio Nelson.

Although Nelson and the British fleet had extinguished French naval power in the Mediterranean by his victory at the Battle of the Nile in August 1798, thereby saving the Kingdom of Naples from naval conquest by Revolutionary France, the French armies entered the north of Italy, where they met successes. In response in December 1798 the King and Queen, together with Acton, Hamilton (and his wife Lady Emma Hamilton), by order of Nelson were evacuated from Naples on board HMS Vanguard to the King's Sicilian capital of Palermo. Thereupon, freed of the royal presence, the Neapolitan citizens and nobles sympathetic to the ideals of the French Revolution promptly established the short-lived Parthenopean Republic, with the aid of the French. However the monarchy was restored in Naples five months later with the help of a Calabrian army, called the Sanfedisti, led by Cardinal Ruffo. To re-establish order and with the consent of the Queen and the help of Ruffo, Acton established at Naples the Junta of State, a reign of terror during which many prominent citizens were thrown into prison or executed.

In 1804, Acton was removed from power, on the demand of France, but nevertheless advised the king, who had agreed to an alliance with Napoleon, to permit British and Russian troops to land at Naples. Acton was granted a pension of 3000 ducats and was created Duke of Modica, which he later renounced. Shortly afterwards, the minister was recalled, but when the French entered Naples in 1806, he together with the royal family again took refuge in Sicily. A letter of 25 July 1809 reported that Acton had "returned a few days since from the baths of Termina, not in the least benefited by their waters. The painful effects of a paralytic stroke, and a severe fall last year, are now aggravated by a nearly total deprivation of sight."

== Succession to baronetcy ==
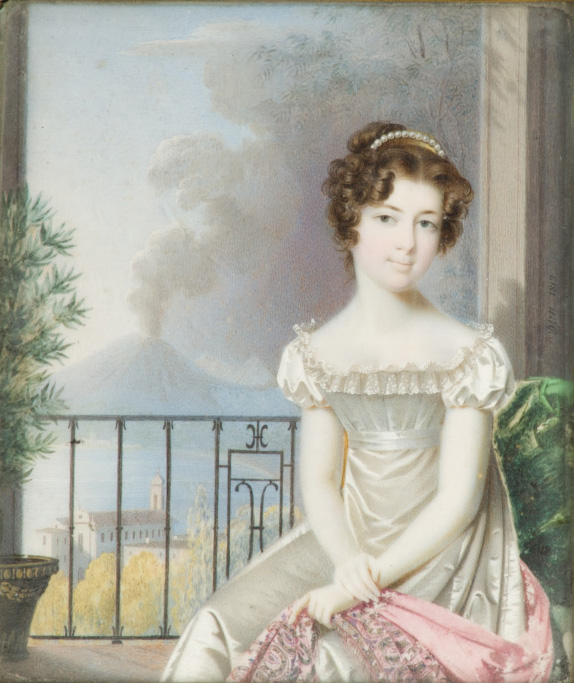
1823 portrait of Mary Acton

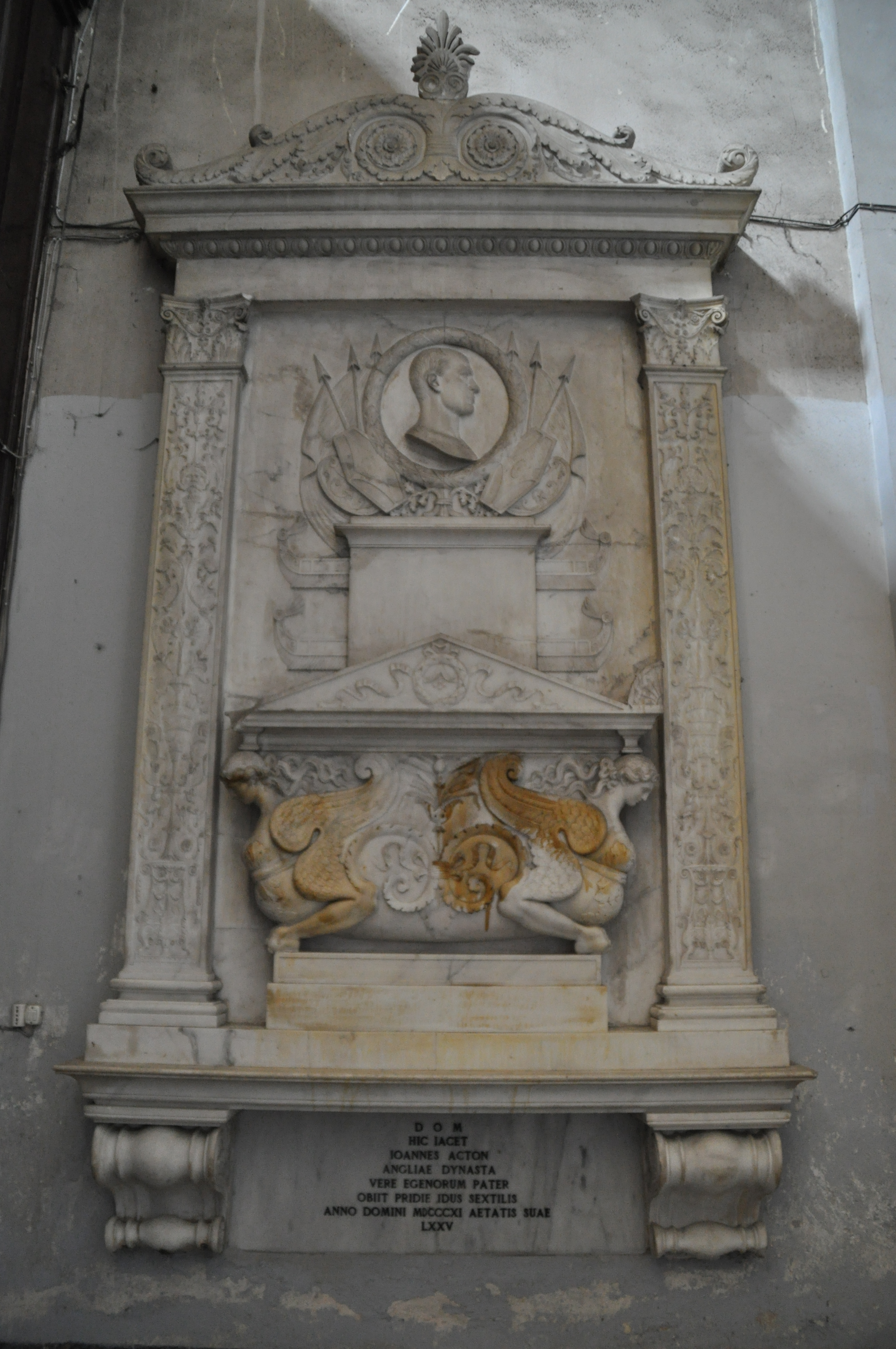
Funerary monument to Acton at the Santa Ninfa dei Crociferi

In 1791, aged 55, he succeeded to the Acton baronetcy and estates on the death of his second cousin once removed, Sir Richard Acton, 5th Baronet of Aldenham Park in Shropshire.

== Marriage and issue ==
On 2 February 1800, at the age of 63, he married his 13-year-old niece Mary Ann Acton (1786–1873), the eldest daughter of his younger brother General Joseph Edward Acton (1737–1830) and his wife, Marie Eleonore Berghe von Trips (1769–1848), sister-in-law of Louis, Landgrave of Hesse-Philippsthal. The marriage appears to have been made for dynastic purposes to keep control of the family's wealth and required papal dispensation due to consanguinity. On hearing the news Nelson commented "it is never too late to do well" and following his arrival in Naples threw a party for the newlyweds aboard his flagship, the Foudroyant. "By raising the awning twenty feet, removing the guns, and robing the masts in silk, two spacious rooms were given, and these were most splendidly decorated; and when lighted up in the evening, really presented a fairy-like appearance, while the music that floated over the calm waters of this beautiful bay was softened. All the nobles of the court, with the exception of the king and queen, were there". The festivities were somewhat marred when a drunk British lieutenant accidentally knocked an Italian princess into the water; on emerging she furiously and unsuccessfully demanded he be hanged from the foreyard arm.

By his wife he had three children:

- Sir Ferdinand Richard Edward Dalberg-Acton, 7th Baronet (1801–1837), eldest son and heir, whose son was John Emerich Edward Dalberg-Acton, 1st Baron Acton, 13th Marquess of Groppoli.
- Charles Januarius Edward Cardinal Acton (1803–1847)
- Elizabeth Acton (1806–1850), who married Sir Robert Throckmorton, 8th Baronet, of Coughton Court, Warwickshire, and had issue.

== Death, burial and monument ==
He died at Palermo on 12 August 1811, aged 75, and a "magnificent funeral was prepared for him; but during the procession, so tremendous a shower of rain came on, that the body remained abandoned in the street for a long time."

Acton was buried in the church of Santa Ninfa dei Crociferi, where survives his wall monument, displaying sculpted (all in relief) his bust within a laurel circlet and antique trophy of arms above a pedimented sarcophagus in the form of a double-bodied winged Sphinx, inscribed in Latin as follows:

DOM hic jacet Joannes Acton Angliae dynasta vere egenorum pater. Obiit pridie idus sextilis Anno Domini MDCCCXI aetatis suae LXXV ("To the greatest and best God. Here lies John Acton, from a dynasty of England, truly the father of the needy. He died on the first day of the Ides of the (i.e of the Roman year commencing in March, thus August) in the year of our Lord 1811, (in the year) of his age 75").

== Notes ==
Baronetage of England
Preceded by Richard Acton	Baronet (of Aldenham); 1791–1811	Succeeded by Ferdinand Acton
