= Marquess of Groppoli =

Marquessate of Groppoli
- Arms of the Brignole-Sale family
- Creation date: 1577 (first creation); 1592 (second creation)
- Created by: Rudolph II, Holy Roman Emperor (first creation); Ferdinando I de' Medici, Grand Duke of Tuscany (second creation)
- Peerage: Holy Roman Empire; Grand Duchy of Tuscany
- First holder: Francesco I de' Medici (first creation); Giulio Sale (second creation)
- Present holder: John Lyon-Dalberg-Acton, 5th Baron Acton
- Heir apparent: Hon. Robert Peter Lyon-Dalberg-Acton
- Remainder to: The 1st Marquess' heirs of the body lawfully begotten.
- Status: Extant
- Former seats: Palazzo Giulio Sale, Palazzo Rosso, Palazzo Bianco and Villa Brignole Sale in Genoa and Groppoli Castle in Mulazzo

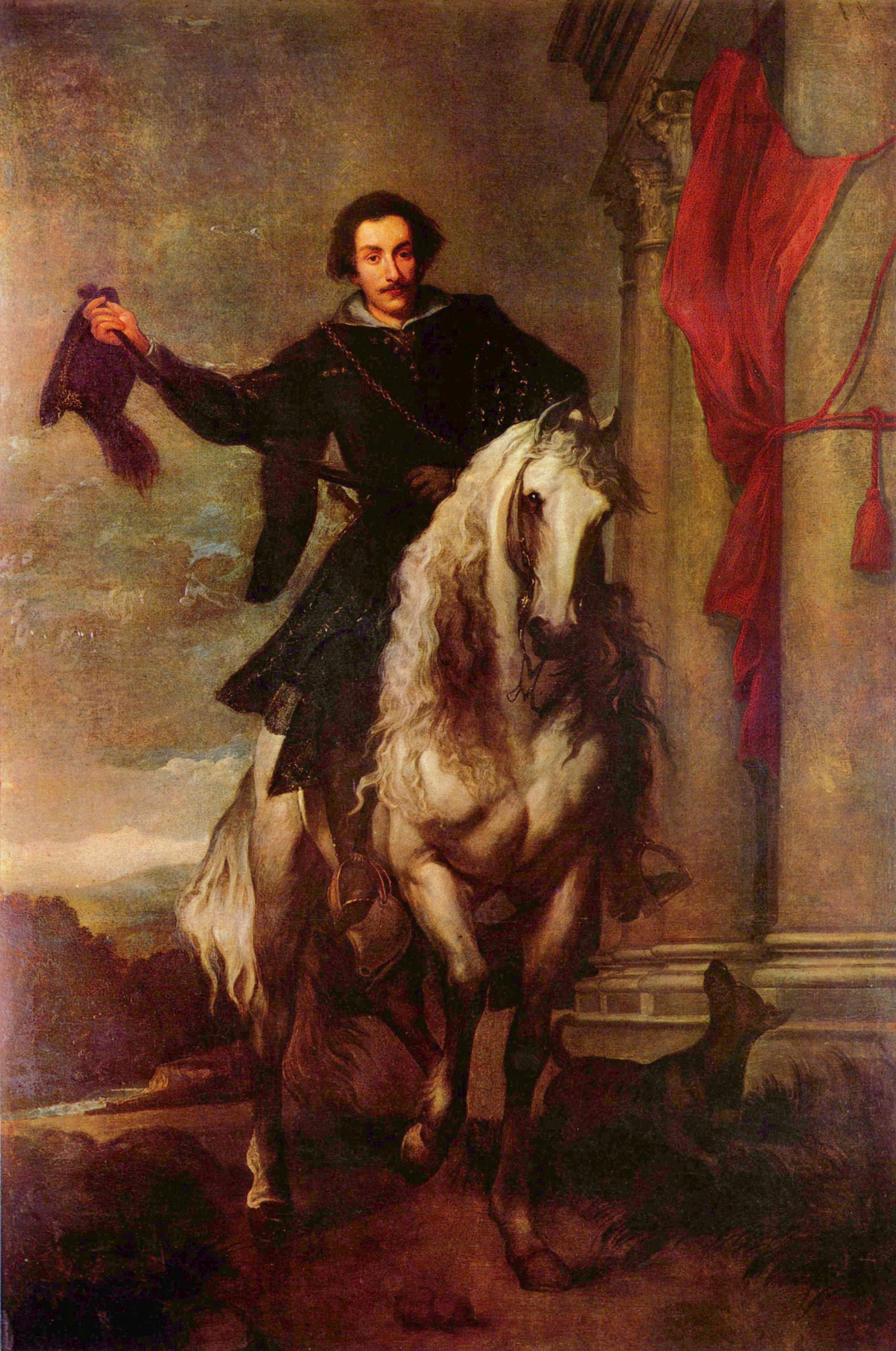
Anton Giulio Brignole-Sale, by Anthony van Dyck 1627

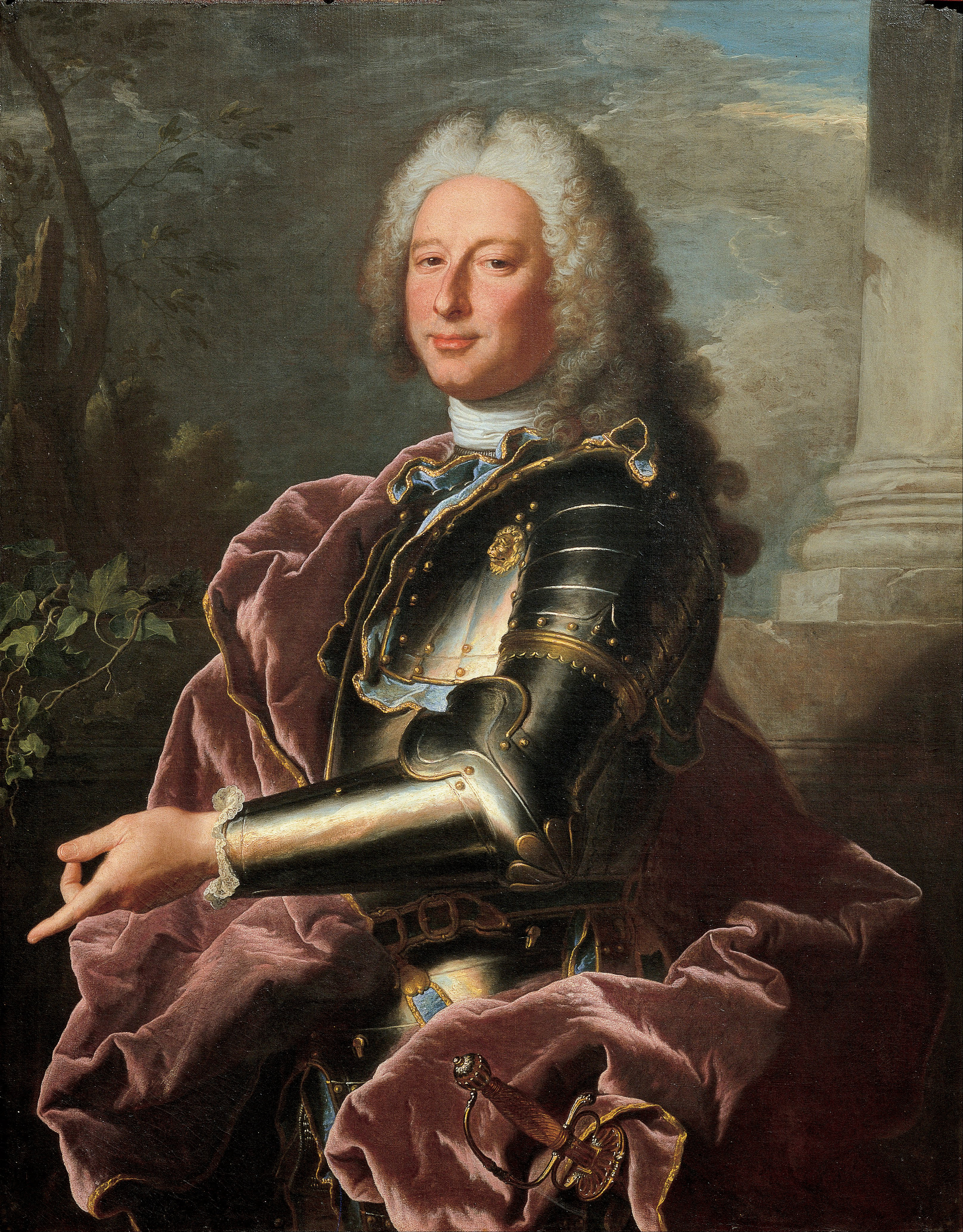
Giovanni Francesco II Brignole-Sale, Doge of Genoa 1746-48, by Hyacinthe Rigaud 1739

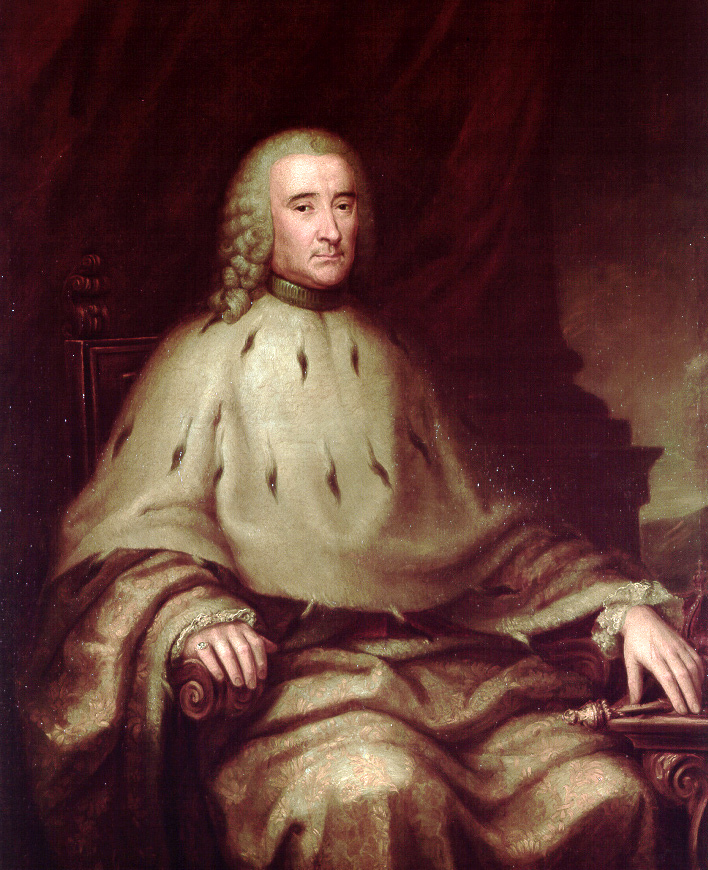
Rodolfo II Brignole-Sale, Doge of Genoa 1762-64, by Giovanni Battista Chiappe

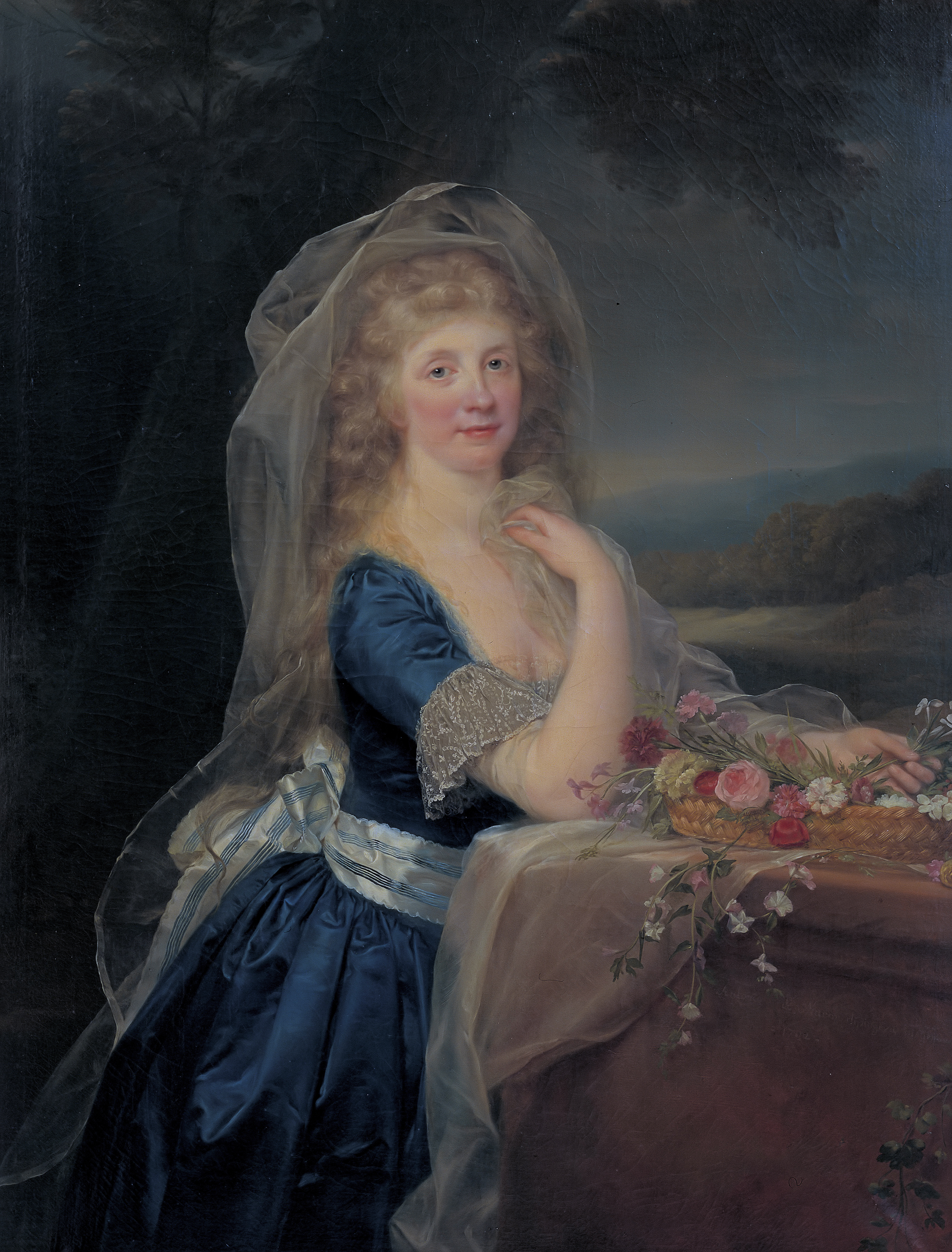
Anna Pieri, wife of the 9th Marquess, by Anton von Maron 1792

The Marquessate of Groppoli, in Tuscany and Liguria, was ruled by the House of Brignole-Sale, an illustrious patrician family of Genoa who were its sovereigns from 1592 to 1774.

It was originally an imperial fief, part of the former lands of the Malaspina di Mulazzo family, and later became a fief of the Grand Duchy of Tuscany.

The commune covered an area of 12 km². It was inhabited by 131 families and had a total population of 712 in 1833.

== The Marquessate of Groppoli ==
Due to its strategic, military and commercial position, the Marquessate served as a hinge between Liguria, Lombardy and Tuscany. As such the Republic of Genoa and the Medici family competed to extend their dominance over the region. In the medieval period Groppoli formed a part of the lands held by the Malaspina family. The imperial fief of Groppoli was acquired by Count Landi of Piacenza, as the inheritance of his wife Briseide, daughter of Azzone Malaspina, and in 1549 Landi sold it to Cosimo I de' Medici. After a five-year dispute in the Imperial Aulic Council it returned to the hands of Giovan Cristoforo Malaspina. In 1576 it became autonomous again as a result of the division between the brothers Antonio Maria, Octavian, Giovanni Gaspar and Caesar, sons of Giovan Cristoforo Malaspina. But the fief did not remain in the hands of Antonio Maria for long and in March 1577 he sold it for 21,000 scudi to Francesco I de' Medici, who received the imperial investiture the following year.

On 4 July 1592 Ferdinando I de' Medici granted the marquessate to Giulio Cibo Sale for 'the sincere devotion shown on several occasions to the Florentine court' and a payment of 30,000 scudi in gold. Giulio was installed in the fief, which included the castle and the surrounding territory, which could be inherited by males and females, provided that the marquisate was kept undivided. The new feudal lord was granted the rights and privileges of hunting, fishing, gabelle, tolls, mills, etc., but was forbidden from granting pardons and making a military levy.

Giulio's only daughter and heiress Geronima married into the Brignole family and in 1607 the lands and title passed to her two-year-old son Anton Giulio, who took the name Brignole-Sale.

The Marquessate was governed at a distance and ruled by the functionaries of the Brignole-Sale family who sometimes abused their powers, especially in the early 18th century.

The Marquessate was in effect independent and entered into the orbit of the Republic of Genoa. It was occupied from 1746 to 1748 by the Austrians, while Gian Francesco II Brignole-Sale was Doge of Genoa. In 1749, the Doge Gian Francesco II Brignole Sale, breaking with the policy of his predecessors, decided to directly administer his lands and dispense justice himself in an attempt to detach the Marquessate by refusing to apply the laws of the Grand Duchy of Tuscany. At his death in 1760, his brother Rodolfo II Brignole-Sale inherited the Marquessate and from then on the Grand Duchy of Tuscany unceasingly attempted to recover Groppoli.

In 1773, the people of Groppoli, unhappy with the fiscal policies of the Brignole-Sale family, revolted and besieged the 15th century castle.

In 1774, when Rodolfo's son succeeded, he was dispossessed of his authority and power. Thereafter the Marquessate was directly administered by Tuscany.

Maria Brignole-Sale, Duchess of Galliera created a charity, Opera Pia Brignole Sale di Voltri, and endowed it with the estate in 1877. However, following her death the charity put the estate up for auction for 201,000 lira in March 1890.

== List of Marquesses of Groppoli ==
- Giulio Sale, 1st Marquess of Groppoli (d. 1607), succeeded by his grandson,

Giulio had a daughter and heiress named Geronima who married her first cousin Gio Francesco Brignole, Doge of Genoa. Following Giulio Sale's death in 1607 the Grand Duke of Tuscany made a second investiture of the Marquessate on 27 June 1610. In accordance with the will of Giulio Sale the remainder was limited to the male line only:

- Anton Giulio Brignole-Sale, 2nd Marquess of Groppoli (1605-1662), succeeded by his son,
- Rodolfo I Brignole-Sale, 3rd Marquess of Groppoli (1631-1683), succeeded by his brother,
- Gio Francesco I Brignole-Sale, 4th Marquess of Groppoli (1643-1694), succeeded by his son,
- Anton Giulio II Brignole-Sale, 5th Marquess of Groppoli (1673-1710), succeeded by his son,
- Gio Francesco II Brignole-Sale, 6th Marquess of Groppoli (1695-1760), Doge of Genoa and 7th King of Corsica, succeeded by his brother,
- Giuseppe Brignole-Sale, 7th Marquess of Groppoli (1703-1769), succeeded by his brother,

His only surviving child was Maria Caterina Brignole, who married Honoré III, Prince of Monaco and became ancestor of the Princes of Monaco. However she did not succeed to the Marquessate, which passed to her father Giuseppe's brother,

- Rodolfo II Brignole-Sale, 8th Marquess of Groppoli (1708-1774), Doge of Genoa, succeeded by his son,

In 1774 the Marquessate was annexed to the Grand Duchy of Tuscany and the heirs were left with the title only:

- Anton Giulio III Brignole-Sale, 9th Marquess of Groppoli (1764-1802), succeeded by his son,
- Rodolfo III Brignole-Sale, 10th Marquess of Groppoli (1784-1832), ordained in 1806 and renounced the title, succeeded by his brother,
- Anton Giulio IV Brignole-Sale, 11th Marquess of Groppoli (1786-1863), succeeded by his daughter (became dormant)

Under the terms of the second investiture of 27 June 1610 (which limited the title to the male line) the Marquessate became extinct at his death. However, under the terms of the original investiture of 1592 the title was able to pass through the female line (the 2nd Marquess having succeeded in this way). When the 11th Marquess died in 1863, Italian law would have required that the succession to the title by his daughter Maria be confirmed by the new King of Italy. Since Maria made no such request, the title became dormant:

- Maria Brignole-Sale, Duchess of Galliera, 12th Marchioness of Groppoli (1811-1888), never used the title

Maria married Raffaele de Ferrari, Duke of Galliera. At her death her only surviving child, the well-known stamp collector Philipp von Ferrary, renounced his titles. The dormant title therefore passed to John Dalberg-Acton, 1st Baron Acton, the heir at line of the Brignole-Sale family (the only grandchild of Pellina Brignole-Sale, sister of the 11th Marquess and wife of Emmeric, Duc de Dalberg):

- John Dalberg-Acton, 1st Baron Acton, 13th Marquess of Groppoli (1834-1902), succeeded by his son,
- Richard Lyon-Dalberg-Acton, 2nd Baron Acton, 14th Marquess of Groppoli (1870-1924), succeeded by his son,
- John Lyon-Dalberg-Acton, 3rd Baron Acton, 15th Marquess of Groppoli (1907-1989), succeeded by his son,

In 1946, the Kingdom of Italy was replaced by a republic. Under the Italian Constitution adopted in 1948, titles of nobility are not legally recognised.

- Richard Lyon-Dalberg-Acton, 4th Baron Acton, 16th Marquess of Groppoli (1941-2010), succeeded by his son,
- John Lyon-Dalberg-Acton, 5th Baron Acton, 17th Marquess of Groppoli (b. 1966)

== See also ==
- Gio Francesco Brignole
- Anna Pieri Brignole Sale
- Giacomo Luigi Brignole
- Giacomo Maria Brignole
- Duke of Galliera
- Consulta araldica
- Corpo della Nobiltà Italiana
- List of marquesses in Italy
- Libro d'Oro
- Annuario della Nobiltà Italiana
