= Maria Brignole Sale De Ferrari =

Italian duchess

- Duchess of Galliera
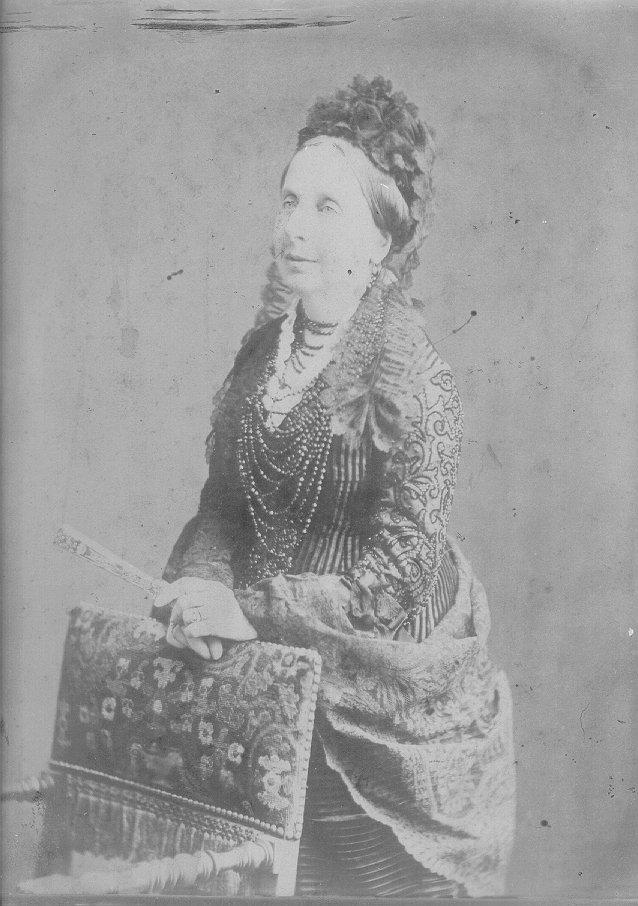
- Maria Brignole Sale De Ferrari; photograph by Nadar
- Born: Maria Brignole Sale; 5 April 1811; Genoa, Kingdom of Sardinia
- Died: 9 December 1888 (aged 77); Paris, France
- Buried: Sanctuary of Madonna delle Grazie, Voltri, Kingdom of Sardinia
- Spouses: Raffaele De Ferrari, 1st Duke of Galliera
- Issue: Filippo de Ferrari
- Father: Antonio Brignole Sale, 11th Marquess of Groppoli
- Mother: Artemisia Negrone

Maria Brignole Sale De Ferrari, Duchess of Galliera (5 April 1811 – 9 December 1888) was an Italian noblewoman and philanthropist. She enabled the foundation of the first museums in her birthplace of Genoa, the Palazzo Rosso and Palazzo Bianco as well as the Galliera Hospital and the San Filippo children's hospital. A statue of her by Giulio Monteverde stands in the hospital gardens.

== Life ==
=== Family ===
Belonging by birth to the House of Brignole-Sale, one of the most prestigious aristocratic families in Genoa and one which had produced several doges, she was born in the city's Palazzo Rosso to Antonio Brignole Sale, 11th Marquess of Groppoli and his wife Artemisia dei Marchesi Negrone. Antonio's mother Anna Pieri had been a lady-in-waiting to Napoleon's second wife Marie Louise, whilst his sister Maria Pellegrina had married Duke Emmerich von Dalberg, second only to Talleyrand in the French diplomatic corps.

Antonio too became a diplomat, taking his daughter to several European capitals and bringing her into contact with major figures of the era. Her parents' fervent Catholicism also instilled strong moral values which emerged when she had to decide how to use her huge fortune, since she had no heir to pass it onto. Maria's younger sister Luigia married the Duke of Lodi, Lodovico Melzi d'Eril.

=== Marriage ===
Aged 17 she married marquess Raffaele De Ferrari (namesake of the main square in Genoa, piazza De Ferrari), making her by marriage Duchess of Galliera (a dukedom granted by the Pope in 1837) and Princess of Lucedio (granted by the King of Italy in 1875) and gaining her many lands and their coats of arms. Their early married life was marked by Raffaele accidentally killing a servant whilst intent on cleaning a firearm. The inquest returned a verdict of accidental death but Raffaele was so disturbed by the event that he immersed himself in his work, which took them to Paris. There he made his fortune in banking and the early French railway industry, thus hugely increasing his and his wife's already large fortunes. He disliked Paris but remained there on his wife's encouragement, she having fallen in love with the city's social life.

=== Paris ===
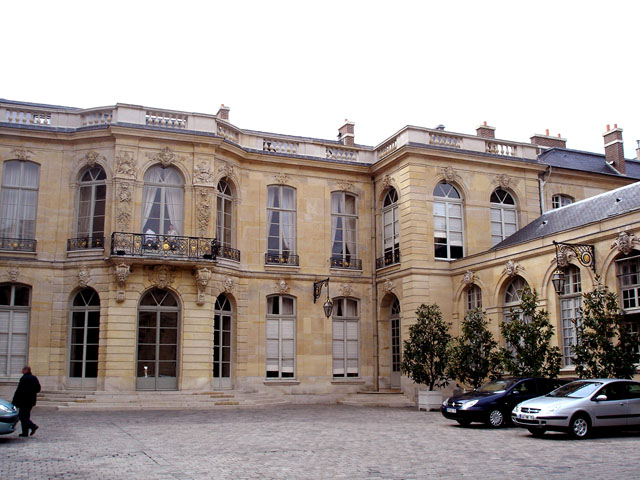
The Hôtel Matignon, now the official residence of the French Prime Minister.

Following the French Revolution of 1848 and Louis Philippe's death in 1850, the royal family sold off their properties to avoid bankruptcy. De Ferrari thus acquired the Hôtel Matignon at 57 rue de Varenne from the Duke of Montpensier in 1852. Renamed the Hôtel Galliera, this 18th-century building had the largest private park in Paris and had been the residence of Maria's ancestor Maria Caterina Brignole-Sale (1737–1813), princess of Monaco. Maria herself called it "comfortable so long as one did not have children" and her husband little by little furnished it with the Brignole family art collection, starting with portraits by Anthony van Dyck and Hyacinthe Rigaud.

The house's parties and eminent guests are still noteworthy. As a personal friend of the former royal family of Bourbon-Orleans, Maria assigned some of them parts of the house during the difficult years of the French Second Republic and the French Third Republic until all the family members had left France. Maria left the house to the Austro-Hungarian Empire to house its French embassy before she left Paris for good – it was confiscated by France in 1922 as war reparations and since 1933 has been the official residence of the country's prime minister.

The couple's first child Livia died in 1829 before her first birthday, whilst their second child Andrea (1831–1847) died at a young age. Their third child Filippo (1850–1917) became an eccentric stamp-collector and found relations with his mother strained by her nostalgia for his two dead siblings and her sympathy for new socialist ideas. He chose to assume Austro-Hungarian citizenship and became an officer in that nation's army, renouncing most of his parents' wealth and titles and dying without issue.

=== Philanthropy ===
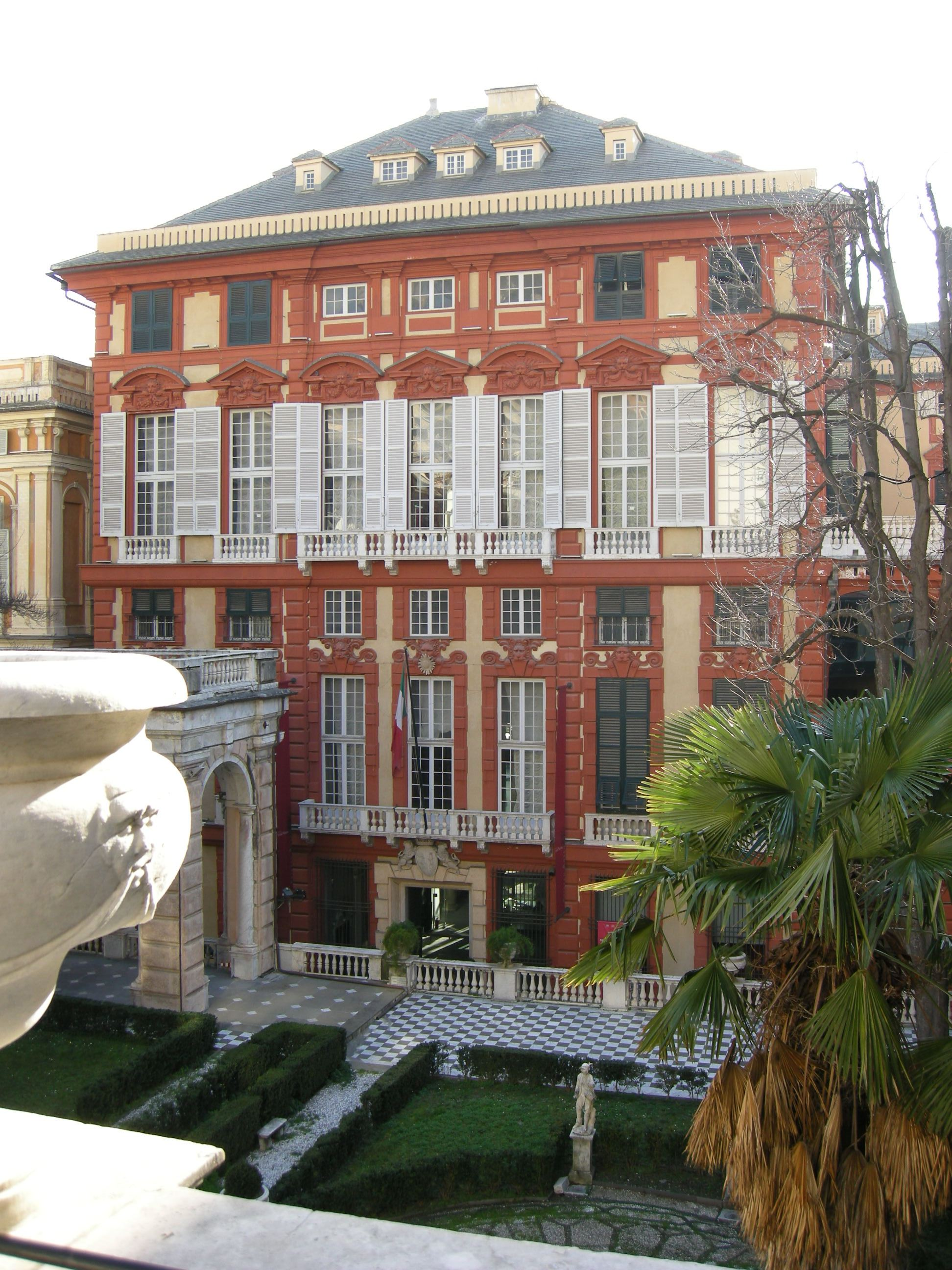
Palazzo Rosso

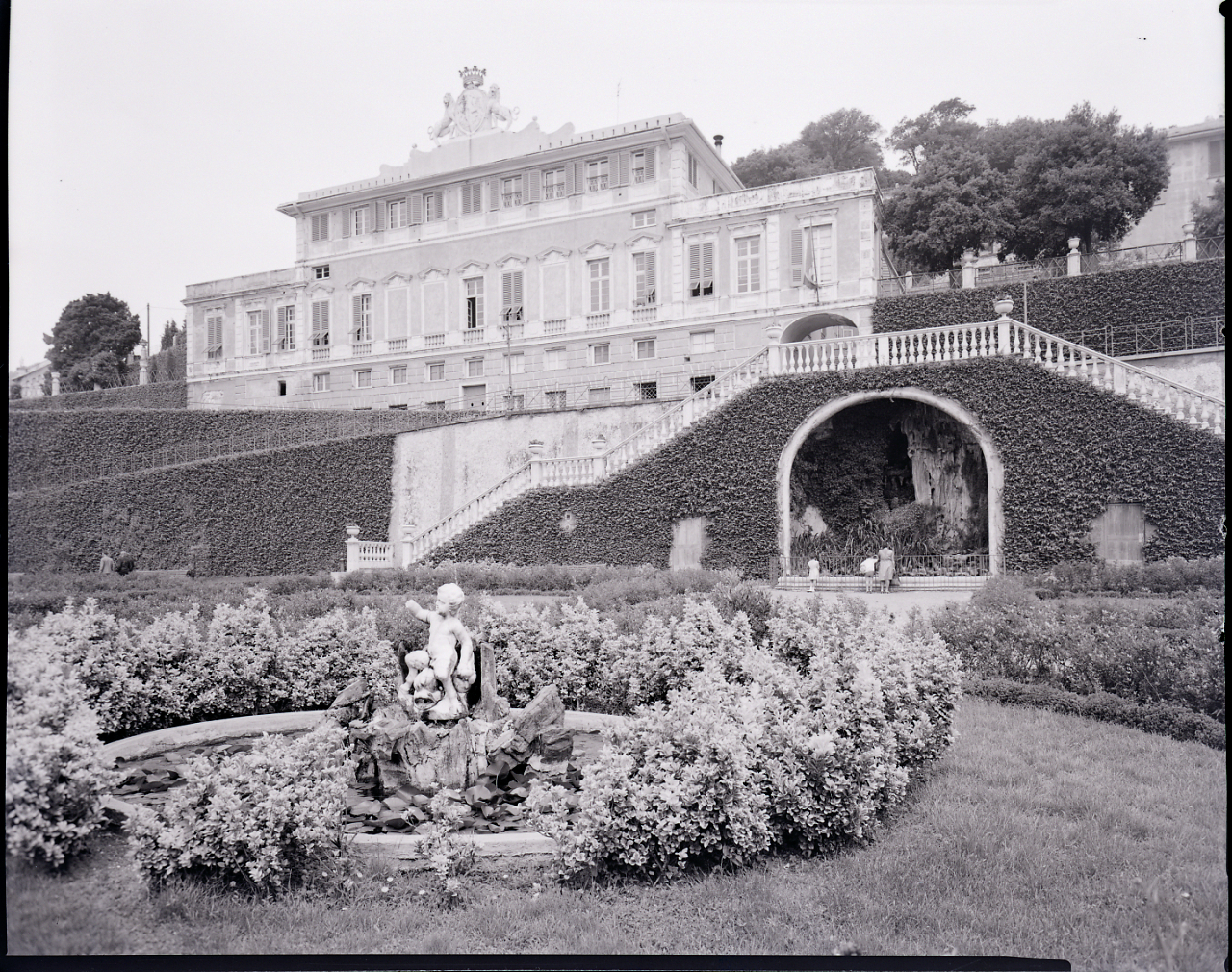
Villa Brignole Sale (Voltri). Photograph by Paolo Monti, 1964.

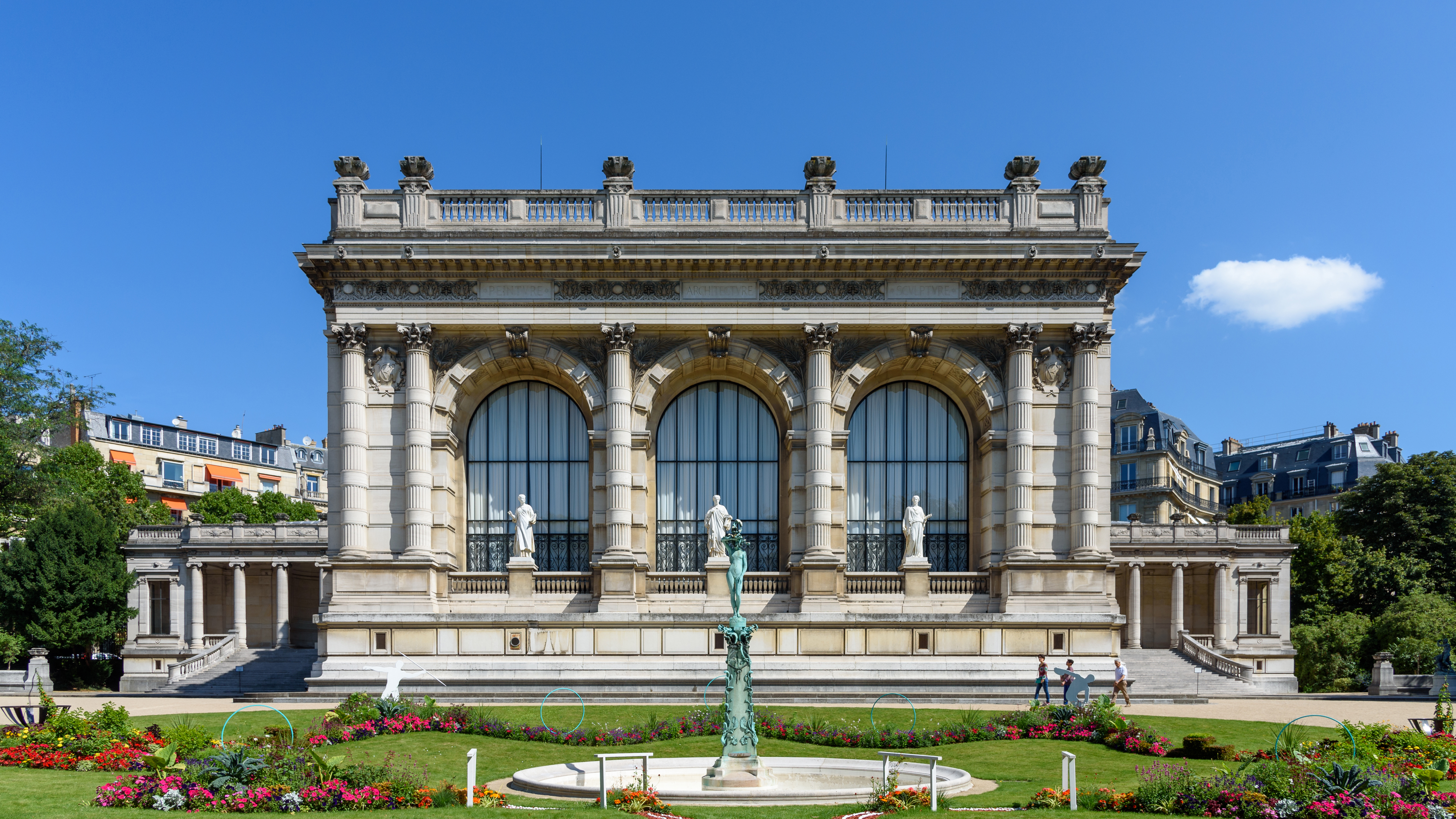
Musée Galliera, fashion museum in Paris

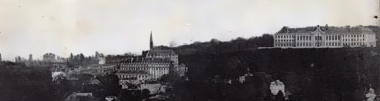
View of the orphanage in Meudon.

Raffaele had in the meantime become senator of the Kingdom of Italy in 1858 and – now effectively without an heir thanks to Filippo's decisions – he decided to devote himself to public works and philanthropy, giving 20,000,000 lira to improve the Port of Genoa, money which also funded the construction of several other pieces of infrastructure, most notably the Galliera, Lucedio and Giano jetties. Raffaele died in 1876 and his widow continued his philanthropic activity as well as that begun by her father Antonio. As well as the "Galliera", "S.Andrea" and "S.Filippo" hospitals, sited around an old Franciscan nunnery, she founded a fourth, the "San Raffaele" in the city's Coronata district.

In 1874 she donated Palazzo Rosso to the city and also left it Palazzo Bianco in her will – they became two of the three sites of the Strada Nuova Museums. In Paris she also built a palace to house her family art collection, but when the French government confiscated all the lands and buildings of the Orleans family, Maria decided to leave that palace to the city of Paris without the artworks, which she instead housed in Palazzo Rosso – the palace in Paris now houses a costume and fashion museum. She also built an old people's home and orphanage, both in Meudon near Paris, costing a total of 47,000,000 francs and both still in operation.

She died in Paris and a special train took her body to Voltri for burial beside her husband in the crypt of the Sanctuary of Madonna delle Grazie, which he had acquired from the Kingdom of Sardinia in 1864 to return it to its original Capuchin owners, from whom it had been confiscated through the laws of that kingdom. The Villa Brignole Sale Duchessa di Galliera in Voltri was left to a charitable "opera pia" – since 1931 it has been used and part-owned by the city council of Genoa. Since her son Filippo renounced his titles, the title of Duke of Galliera passed to the Duke of Montpensier, last surviving direct descendant of Louis Philippe, childhood friend of her son Andrea – it is still held by the Spanish Orleans branch. The dormant title of Marquess of Groppoli, which she inherited but never claimed, passed to her cousin Baron Acton.
