= Anna Pieri Brignole Sale =

Italian noble and court official (1765–1815)

Anna Pieri Brignole-Sale
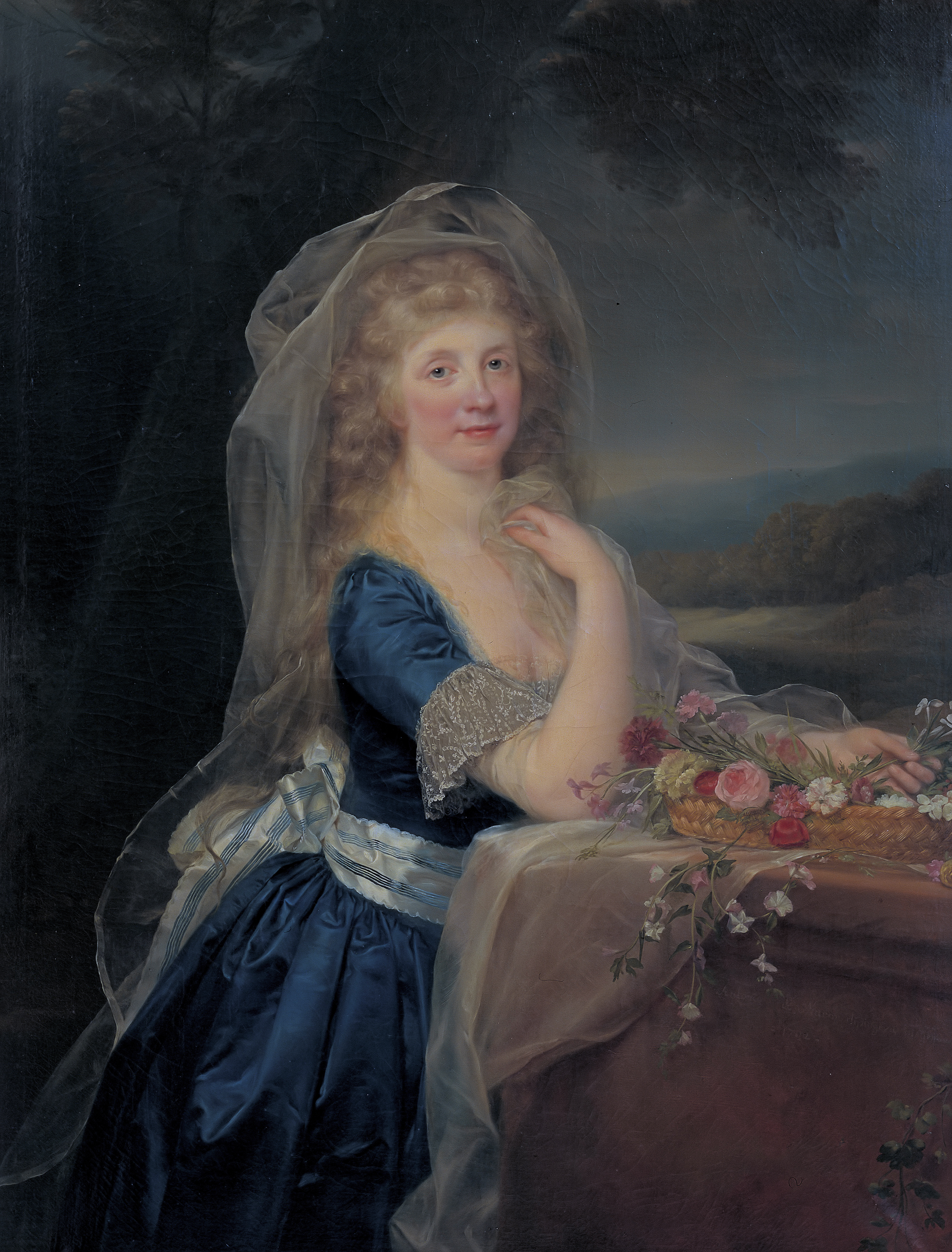
- Portrait by Anton von Maron in 1792
- Born: Anna Maria Gaspara Vincenza Pieri; 1765; Siena, Tuscany
- Died: 1815 (aged 49–50); Schönbrunn Palace, Austria
- Occupation: Aristocrat

Anna Pieri Brignole-Sale (1765–1815) was a Sienese noble and court official. She was a supporter of the French Emperor Napoleon Bonaparte, and became a lady-in-waiting to his second wife, Marie Louise of Austria.

== Life ==
Anna Pieri was born in 1765. She was described as a lively and cultivated Sienese patrician. She married the Genoese aristocrat Anton Giulio II Brignole-Sale in 1786. Her husband came from an old family of Genoa that had given doges to the Republic of Genoa including Giovanni-Francesco Brignole Sale (1635–36) and Gian-Francesco Brignole Sale II (1746–47). They lived in an apartment on the top floor of the Palazzo Rosso in Genoa, where she hosted Enlightenment intellectuals of the day in her salon. Anna Pieri's husband Anton-Giulio died in 1802.

=== Courtier ===
Anna Pieri often visited Paris during the First French Empire, and was admitted to the court as a lady in waiting to Marie Louise of Austria, the second wife of Napoleon. She was created countess in 1810 by the emperor. After Bonaparte was exiled to Elba in 1814, Anna followed Marie Lousie to Austria to try to persuade her to remain faithful to Napoleon and to sustain him during this difficult time. However, the court became increasingly hostile to Napoleon and suspicious of Anna, who was guarded by secret police in the Schönbrunn Palace, where she died in 1815.

== Legacy ==
The Villa Duchessa di Galliera in Genoa today has the only 18th century theatre in Liguria, inaugurated in 1786. Anna Pieri Brignole Sale commissioned the neoclassical decoration by the painter Giuseppe Canepa.

== Issue ==
Anna Pieri's son, Anton Giulio IV Brignole-Sale, 11th Marquess of Groppoli (1786–1863), attended the Congress of Vienna as a member of the Genoa Commission for restoration of the statehood of Genoa. He was rumored, probably without foundation, to be acting as the agent of Napoleon and Joachim Murat. Although he had a large sum of money to advance the cause, he did not succeed. She also had a daughter, Thérèse-Catherine de Brignole-Sale (1787–1865). Her granddaughter, Maria Brignole-Sale (1812–88) became Duchess of Galliera by marriage.

== Sources ==
- "A Palazzo Rosso una pièce su Anna Pieri", mentelocale (in Italian), 9 November 2006, archived from the original on 29 December 2018
- Bonaparte, Julie; Basso, Isa Dardano (1975), La princesse Julie Bonaparte, marquise de Roccagiovine et son temps: mémoires inédits, 1853–1870 (in French), Ed. di Storia e Letteratura, GGKEY:J9WBCXK0UZU
- Ritratto di Anna Pieri Brignole-Sale (in Italian), Comune di Genova
- Schneider, Karin; Werner, Eva Maria; Mazohl, Brigitte (2015-11-09), Europa in Wien: Who is Who beim Wiener Kongress 1814/15 (in German), Böhlau Verlag Wien, ISBN 978-3-205-79488-2
- Teatro di Villa Duchessa di Galliera (Cargo) (in Italian), Regione Liguria
- Valynseele, Joseph (1959), Les princes et ducs du Premier Empire, non maréchaux (in French), Centrale de l'Ouest
