= Louis Joseph, Prince of Condé =

French royal (1736–1818)

Louis Joseph de Bourbon
- Prince of Condé; Grand Master of France
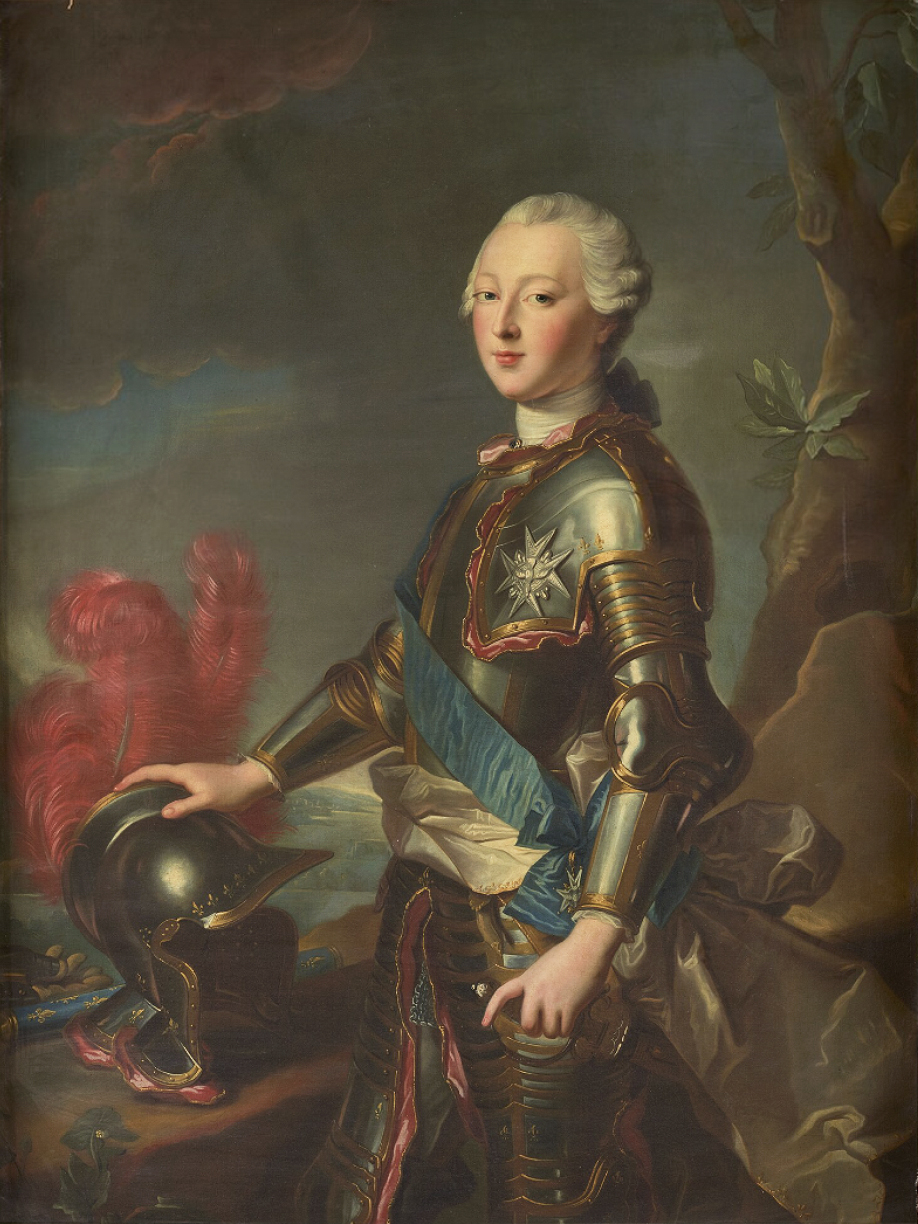
- Standing portrait by Jean-Marc Nattier, circa 1753

Prince of Condé
- Tenure: 27 January 1740 – 13 May 1818
- Predecessor: Louis Henri I
- Successor: Louis Henri II
- Born: 9 August 1736; Hôtel de Condé, Paris, Kingdom of France
- Died: 13 May 1818 (aged 81); Palais Bourbon, Paris, France
- Burial: Basilica of St Denis
- Spouse: Charlotte de Rohan (m. 1753; died 1760) Maria Caterina Brignole (m. 1798; died 1813)
- Issue Detail: Louis Henri II, Prince of Condé; Louise Adélaïde, Abbess of Remiremont
- House: Bourbon-Condé
- Father: Louis Henri I, Prince of Condé
- Mother: Caroline of Hesse-Rotenburg
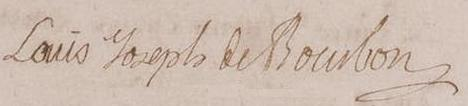
- Signature

Louis Joseph de Bourbon (9 August 1736 – 13 May 1818) was Prince of Condé from 1740 to his death. A member of the House of Bourbon, he held the prestigious rank of Prince du Sang.

During the French revolution, Louis was a supporter of the monarchy.

== Youth ==
Born on 9 August 1736 at Chantilly, Louis Joseph was the only son of Louis Henri I, Prince of Condé (1692–1740) and Landgravine Caroline of Hesse-Rotenburg (1714–41). As a cadet of the reigning House of Bourbon, he was a prince du sang. His father Louis Henri was the eldest son of Louis de Bourbon, Prince of Condé (known as Monsieur le Duc) and his wife Louise Françoise de Bourbon, legitimated daughter of Louis XIV and Françoise-Athénaïs de Rochechouart, Marquise de Montespan.

During his father's lifetime, the infant Louis Joseph was known as the Duke of Enghien, (duc d'Enghien). At the age of four, following his father's death in 1740, and his mother's death in 1741, he was placed under the care of his paternal uncle, Louis, Count of Clermont, his father's youngest brother.

== Family ==
Louis Joseph had an older half sister, Henriette de Bourbon, Mademoiselle de Verneuil (1725–1780).

Through his mother, he was a first cousin of King Victor Amadeus III of Sardinia and of Marie Thérèse of Savoy, Princess de Lamballe. His paternal cousins included Louise Henriette de Bourbon, Duchess of Orléans (mother of Philippe Égalité), the sister of Louis François de Bourbon, Prince of Conti, head of another cadet branch of the royal dynasty. Viktoria of Hesse-Rotenburg, the Princess of Soubise, was another first cousin.

In 1753, Louis Joseph married Charlotte de Rohan, the daughter of the French king Louis XV's friend, Charles de Rohan, Prince of Soubise. Charlotte's mother, Anne Marie Louise de La Tour d'Auvergne, was a daughter of Emmanuel Théodose de La Tour d'Auvergne, the reigning Duke of Bouillon. The couple were married at Versailles on 3 May 1753.

Together, they had three children: a daughter, Marie de Bourbon, who died young; an only son, Louis Henri de Bourbon, who would later become the last Prince of Condé; and a daughter, Louise Adélaïde de Bourbon. In 1770, his son married Bathilde d'Orléans, daughter of Louis Philippe I, Duke of Orléans, and sister of Philippe Égalité. The marriage was supposed to heal relations between the Condé and Orléans branches of the royal family.

Louis Joseph's wife Charlotte died in 1760, and as time passed, his relationship with Maria Caterina Brignole, Princess of Monaco, became serious. Maria was the daughter of Giuseppe Brignole, Marquis of Groppoli and Maria Anna Balbi. By 1769, Maria had begun to set up a home in the Hôtel de Lassay, an annex of the Prince of Condé's primary residence, the Palais Bourbon. In 1770, her jealous husband, Honoré III, Prince of Monaco, ordered the borders of Monaco closed in an attempt to prevent her from escaping. She managed, nonetheless, to cross into France and found her way to Le Mans, southwest of Paris, where she took refuge in a convent. Eventually, she was able to return to Paris.

Due to Maria Caterina's illicit position as the Prince of Condé's mistress, the new French queen, 18-year-old Marie Antoinette (wife of King Louis XVI), treated her poorly at court, which consequently offended Louis Joseph. In about 1774, Louis Joseph and his mistress Maria began the construction of the Hôtel de Monaco, which was to be her permanent home in Paris. It was in the rue Saint-Dominique, near the Palais Bourbon, and was completed in 1777. Subsequently, Prince Honoré of Monaco finally realized his relationship with Maria Caterina was completely finished and thereupon turned his attention to his own love affairs. Maria Caterina later wrote to her husband that their marriage could be summarised in three words: greed, bravery, and jealousy.

== Later life ==
Arms of the Prince of Condé

During both the reigns of King Louis XV and his grandson, King Louis XVI, Louis Joseph held the position of Grand Maître de France in the King's royal household, the Maison du Roi. Obtaining the rank of general, he fought in the Seven Years' War with some distinction, serving alongside his father-in-law, the Prince of Soubise. He was also Governor of Burgundy.

Furthermore, the Prince was the leader of the Condé army of émigrés. He used her great fortune to help finance the exiled French community's resistance movement.

In 1765, named the heir of his paternal aunt, Élisabeth Alexandrine de Bourbon, Louis Joseph received generous pensions which Élisabeth Alexandrine had in turn acquired from her cousin, Louise-Françoise de Bourbon. In that same year, Louis Joseph repurchased the Palais Bourbon, previously owned by his family, from King Louis XV, and decided to rebuild it from a country house into a monumental palace, in the new Classical Revival style. With this in mind, he purchased the neighboring Hôtel de Lassay in 1768, planning to make the two buildings into one. However, the palace was only finished at the end of the 1780s, when the French Revolution later swept away the old regime. He then moved from the Hôtel de Condé, where he was born, to the Palais Bourbon. The former residence was later sold to King Louis XV in 1770, becoming the subsequent site of the Odéon Theatre. Among other estates, Louis Joseph also inherited the famous Château de Chantilly, the main seat of the Condé line. At Chantilly, the prince conducted a number of improvements and embellishments in the years before the French Revolution. He had the Château d'Enghien built on the grounds of the estate to house guests when the prince entertained at Chantilly. It was constructed in 1769 by the architect, Jean François Leroy, and was later renamed the Château d'Enghien in honour of his grandson, Louis Antoine de Bourbon, Duke of Enghien, who was born at Chantilly in 1772. He also commissioned a large garden in the English style as well as an hameau, much like the contemporary one that Queen Marie Antoinette had created at Versailles and at the Petit Trianon château.

Louis Joseph lived with his mistress Maria in France until the French Revolution, when the couple left for Germany and then Great Britain. In 1792, he wrote the Brunswick Manifesto, which further spurred French people's revolutionary fervor. In 1795, Prince Honoré of Monaco died, and on 24 October 1798, the Prince of Condé and Maria were married in London. The marriage was kept secret for a decade, the couple reportedly becoming openly known as husband and wife only after 26 December 1808.

== Exile ==
During the French Revolution, Louis Joseph was a dedicated supporter of the monarchy and one of the principal leaders of the counter-revolutionary movement. After the storming of the Bastille in 1789, he fled France with his son and grandson, before the Reign of Terror which arrested, tried and guillotined most of the Bourbons still living in France: Louis XVI, Marie Antoinette and the Duke of Orleans (Philippe Égalité) were executed in 1793, and the king's sister, Madame Élisabeth, was beheaded in 1794.

Louis Joseph established himself at Coblenz in 1791, where he helped to organize and lead a large counter-revolutionary army of émigrés. In addition to containing the prince's grandson, Louis-Antoine-Henri de Bourbon-Condé, duc d'Enghien, and the two sons of his cousin, the late king's brother, the comte d'Artois, the corps included many young aristocrats who eventually became leaders during the Bourbon Restoration years later. This group also included Armand-Emmanuel du Plessis, Duc de Richelieu, Pierre Louis Jean Casimir de Blacas and François-René de Chateaubriand. In 1792, he staid with his entourage at Schloss Dürkheim.

The Army of Condé initially fought in conjunction with the Austrians. Later, due to differences with the Austrian plan of attack, however, the Prince de Condé entered with his corps into English pay in 1795. In 1796, the army fought in Swabia. In 1797, Austria signed the Treaty of Campo Formio with the French First Republic, formally ending its hostilities against the French. With the loss of its closest allies, the army transferred into the service of the Russian tsar, Paul I and was stationed in Poland, returning in 1799 to the Rhine under Alexander Suvorov. In 1800 when Russia left the Allied coalition, the army re-entered English service and fought in Bavaria.

The army was disbanded in 1801 without having achieved its principal ambition, restoring Bourbon rule in France. After the dissolution of the corps, the prince spent his exile in England, where he lived with his second wife, Maria Caterina Brignole, the divorced wife of Honoré III, Prince of Monaco, whom he had married in 1798. She died in 1813.

With the defeat of Napoleon, Louis Joseph returned to Paris, where he resumed his courtly duties as grand maître in the royal household of Louis XVIII. He died in 1818 and was succeeded by his son, Louis Henri. His daughter, Louise Adélaïde de Bourbon, who was a nun and had become the abbess of Remiremont Abbey, survived until 1824. He was buried at the Basilica of St Denis.

== Issue ==
1. Marie de Bourbon, Mademoiselle de Bourbon (16 February 1755 – 22 June 1759) died in infancy.
2. Louis Henri Joseph de Bourbon, Prince of Condé, Duke of Bourbon (13 April 1756 – 30 August 1830) married Bathilde d'Orléans and had issue.
3. Louise Adélaïde de Bourbon (5 October 1757 – 10 March 1824) died unmarried.

== References and notes ==
Louis Joseph, Prince of Condé House of Bourbon Cadet branch of the House of Bourbon Born: 9 August 1736 Died: 13 May 1818
French nobility
Preceded by Louis Henri de Bourbon	Prince of Condé; 27 January 1740 – 13 May 1818	Succeeded by Louis Henri de Bourbon
