= Giuseppe Brignole =

Giuseppe Brignole-Sale

7th Marquess of Groppoli
- Full name: Giuseppe Maria Brignole-Sale
- Born: 18 February 1703; Palazzo Rosso, Republic of Genoa
- Died: 6 January 1769 (aged 65); Palazzo Rosso, Republic of Genoa
- Spouse: Maria Anna Balbi
- Issue: Maria Caterina, Princess of Monaco
- Father: Anton Giulio Brignole-Sale
- Mother: Isabella Brignole

Giuseppe Maria Brignole-Sale (1703–1769) was a Genoese nobleman and father of Maria Caterina Brignole, Princess of Monaco and later Princess of Condé. He was the 7th Marquess of Groppoli. The reigning Albert II of Monaco is a direct descendant.

== Biography ==
Giuseppe was the son of Anton Giulio Brignole-Sale, 5th Marquess of Groppoli (1673–1710) and Isabella Brignole, one of the most powerful and wealthy families in the Republic of Genoa. His brothers Gio Francesco Brignole Sale, 6th Marquess (1695–1760) and Rodolfo Brignole-Sale, 8th Marquess (1708–1774) acted as Doges of Genoa.

At the premature death of his older brother Gian Giacomo, Giuseppe married his own sister-in-law Maria Anna Balbi, a member of the powerful Balbi family. Balbi would later become the mistress of Honoré III, Prince of Monaco, the couple's first son-in-law. She was also the mistress of the maréchal de Richelieu.

Like his brothers, Brignole acted as ambassador to the Palace of Versailles. When his wife took their young daughter to Versailles, his wife became an instant success and would frequent the palace and Paris as much as she could. While at Versailles, his wife started an affair with the young Honoré III, Prince of Monaco and when she suggested that their daughter marry her ex lover, Brignole refused fearing for his reputation. Honoré III pressured for seventeen months but then opened negotiations to marry the daughter of the Duke of La Vallière. However, the French King Louis XV spoiled the relations between Honoré III and the Duke of La Vallière. Negotiations then changed and their daughter Maria Caterina married Honrore III by Proxy on 15 June 1757. Mother and daughter then went to Monaco by ship.

In 1760 he became the 7th Marquess of Groppoli having inherited the title from his brother. At his own death his properties passed to his younger brother Rodolfo Brignole-Sale. Giuseppe died at the Palazzo Rosso in Genoa.

== Issue ==
1. Maria Caterina Brignole (7 October 1737 – 18 March 1813) married Honoré III, Prince of Monaco and had issue. Remarried in 1798 to Louis Joseph de Bourbon, Prince of Condé, no issue.
