= Schloss Dürkheim =

Former palace in Dürkheim, Germany

Coordinates: 49°27′46″N 8°10′08″E

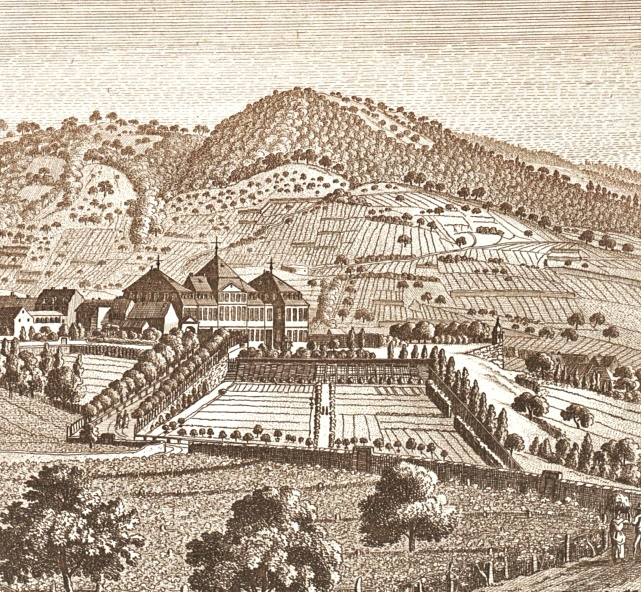
Schloss Dürkheim (1787)

Schloss Dürkheim (English: Dürkheim palace) is a former Baroque-style palace in Bad Dürkheim, a spa town in Rhineland-Palatinate, Germany. It was the seat of the Counts and later Princes of Leiningen. Except for a few remnants, it has disappeared; today, the Kurhaus and the Kurpark-Hotel stand in its place.

== History ==
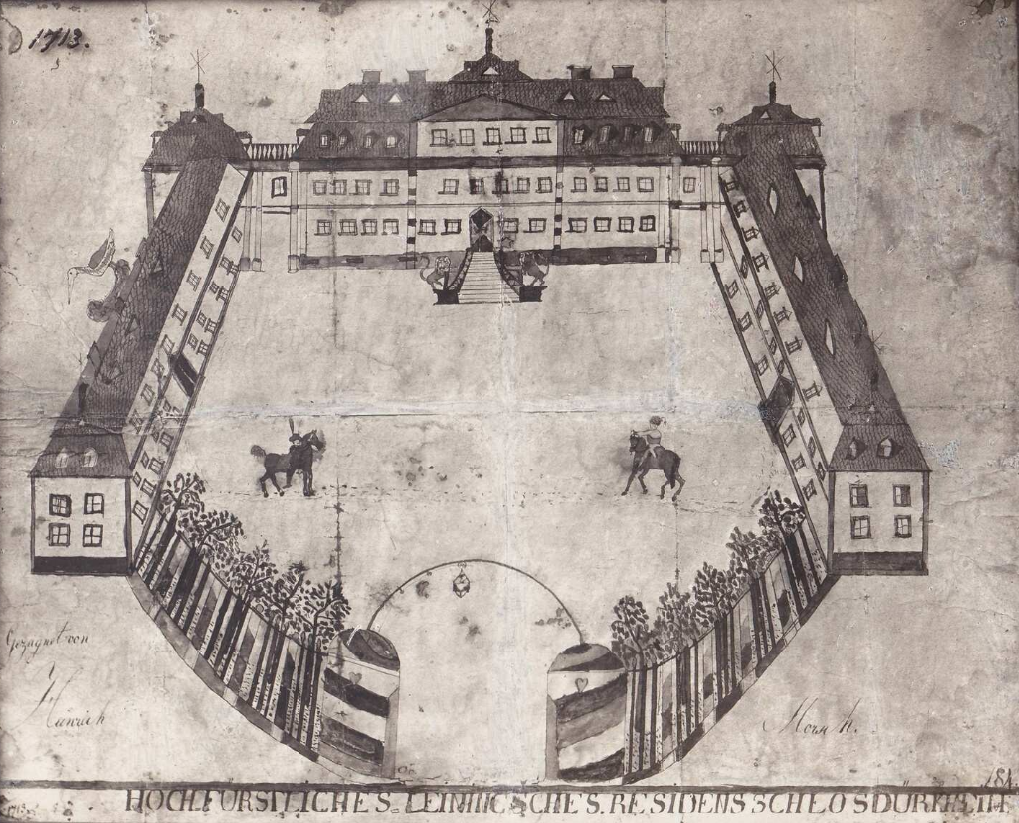
Schloss Dürkheim ouf of memory by Heinrich Morsch (1843)

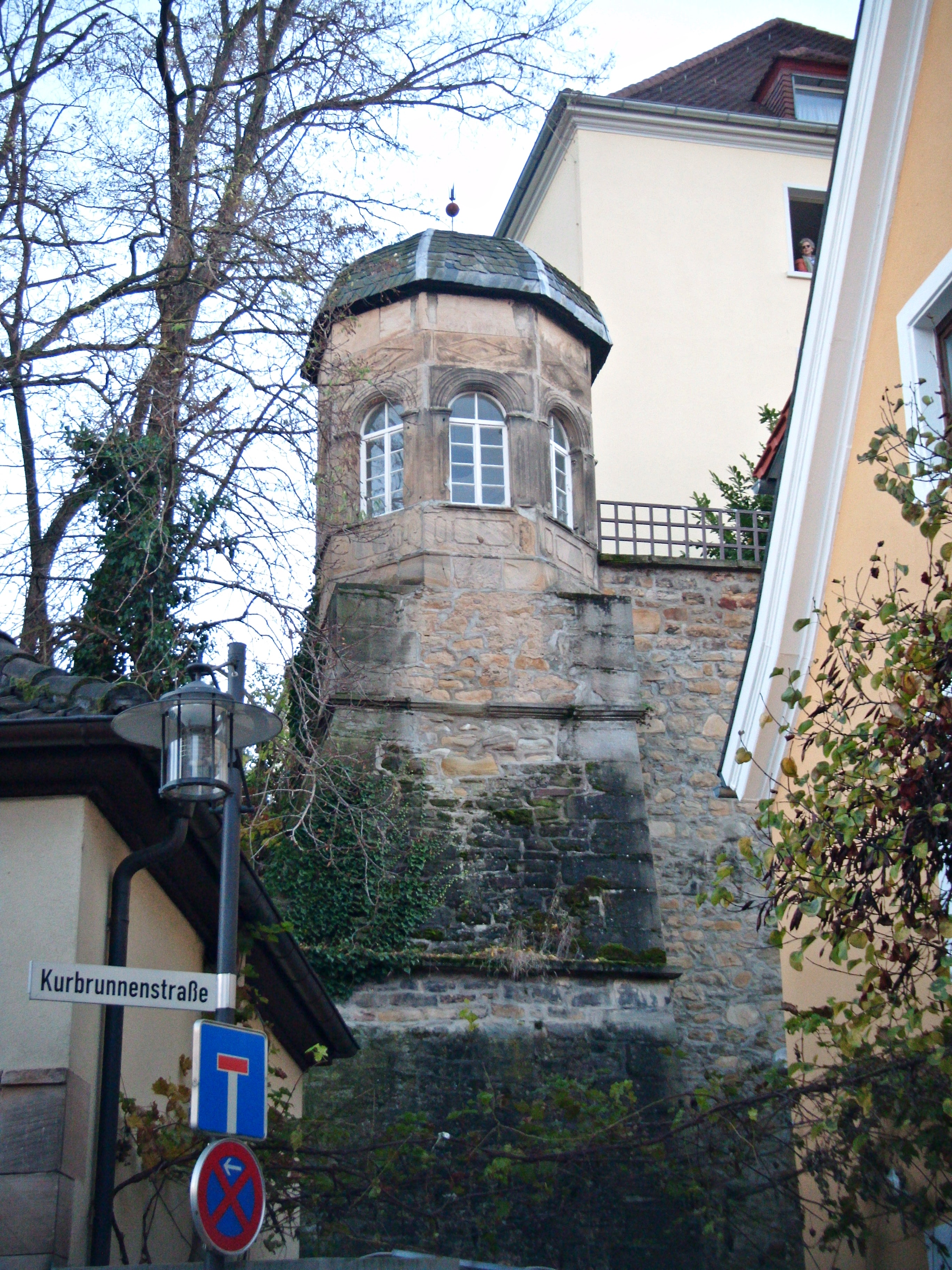
The baroque pavilion on the northern wall of the former palace, with the Kurpark-Hotel behind it.

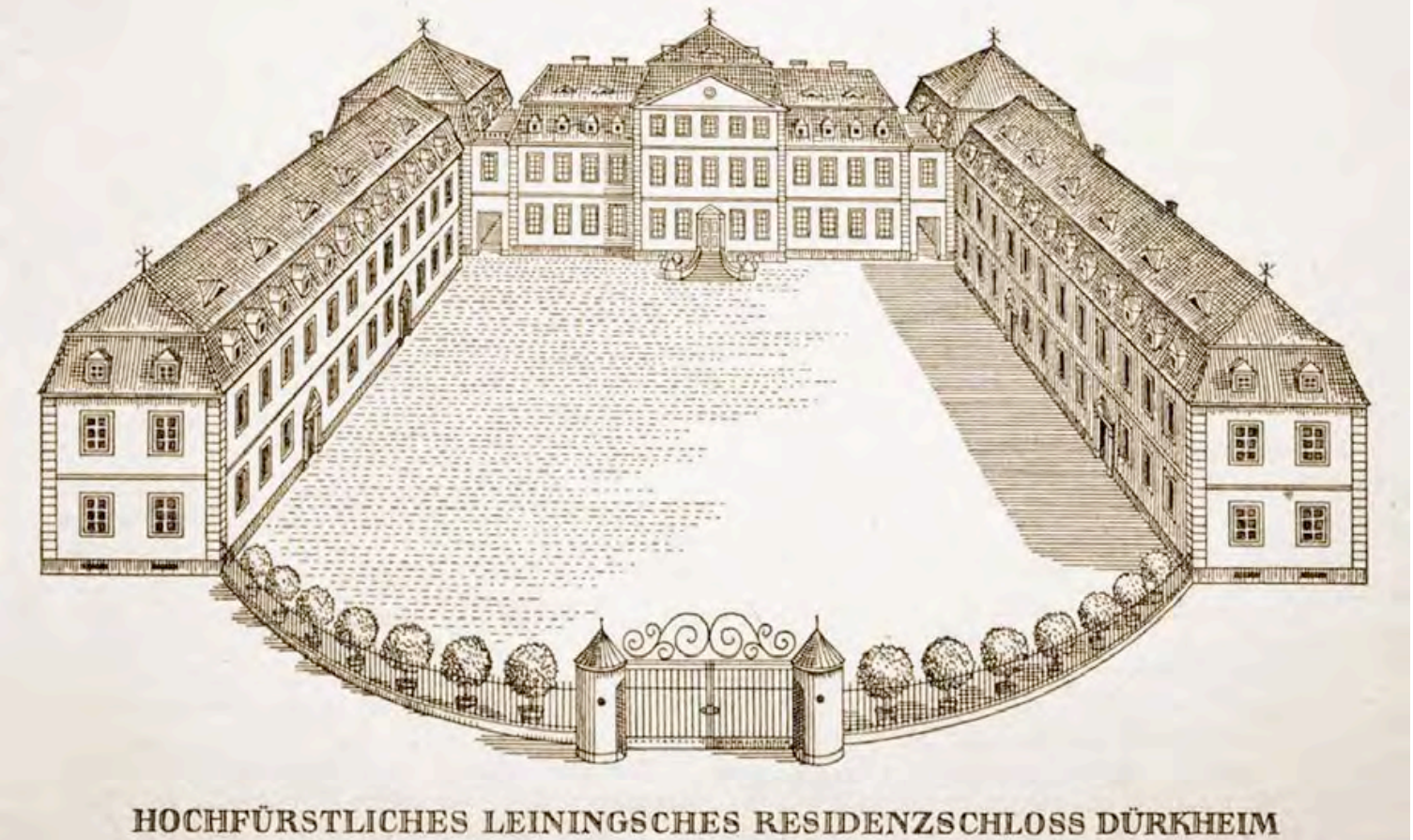
Schloss Dürkheim (1787)

From 1560 to 1725, the Hardenburg castle was the main residence of the Counts of Leiningen-Dagsburg-Hardenburg. In 1725, they moved their residence to the centrally located town of Dürkheim, which also gained economic importance and became the capital of the county. To this end, the ruling Count Friedrich Magnus of Leiningen-Dagsburg-Hardenburg (1703–1756) had the Baroque-style Dürkheim Palace built as a residence between 1720 and 1725 on a hill at the northeastern corner of Bad Dürkheim. To the north, he incorporated the medieval city wall as the outer boundary of the palace grounds. From 1739 onward, he extended or heightened this wall and laid out a garden between it and the palace, where today the buildings and parking lot of the Kurpark-Hotel are located. During this time, Count Friedrich Magnus had a Latin builder's inscription placed on the wall, which has been preserved. At the northeastern corner, the garden pavilion with a bell roof was probably built at the same time, and today it is the last remaining structure of the palace.

His son and successor, Carl Friedrich Wilhelm, the 1st Prince of Leiningen from 1779, had side wings added to the palace and, starting in 1762, laid out a large garden or park to the east, the present Kurpark area. Around 1780, he converted one wing of the palace into a public theater, which citizens could visit free of charge. The theater was organized and managed by August Wilhelm Iffland, who worked in nearby Mannheim and occasionally premiered his works there, such as the play "The Hunters" on 9 March 1785. Under Iffland's personal direction, the future Prince Emich Carl of Leiningen (1763–1814), son of the theater patron, played one of the lead roles, along with his relative Heinrich Ernst Ludwig of Leiningen-Westerburg-Neuleiningen (1752–1799) from Grünstadt.

In the same time, prince Carl Friedrich also erected a hunting lodge in Jägerthal, ten kilometers to the south of Dürkheim, where he also established a theater. Iffland directed here as well. The princely family spent the summer months at Jägerthal, while Dürkheim was the main seat of the family in the principality.

In August 1792, the exiled Louis Joseph, Prince of Condé from revolutionary France stayed at Dürkheim Palace with his entourage. In September of that year, French general Adam-Philippe de Custine established his headquarters there. His troops were driven out by the Prussians in April 1793, who also made the palace their headquarters and remained until the end of the year. During this period, Prussian king Frederick William II and his son, the future king Frederick William III of Prussia, visited the palace several times.

On 31 January 1794, the returning French Revolutionary Army burned down Dürkheim Palace and forbade any firefighting efforts. As the lands on the Left Bank of the Rhine became permanently part of France, the princely family of Leiningen could not return, and the palace was never rebuilt. The French also destroyed the summer palace in Jägerthal.

=== Kurhaus ===
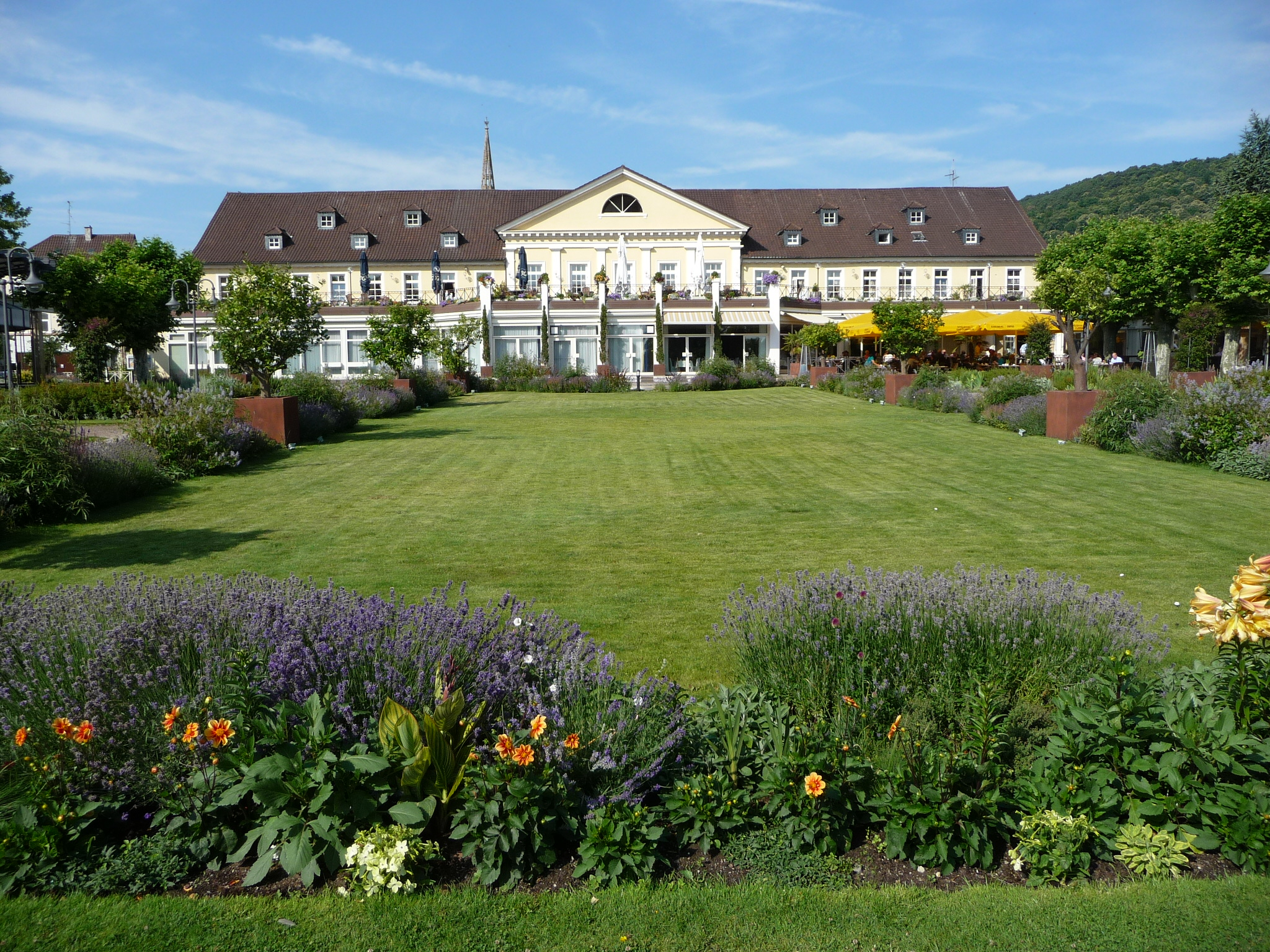
The Kurhaus stands on the former location of the Dürkheim Palace

After Bad Dürkheim became part of the Kingdom of Bavaria in 1816, the present Kurhaus was built on its site between 1822 and 1826, based on plans by Johann Bernhard Spatz (1782–1840), serving as the town hall and city hall. An inscription on its south side commemorates Dürkheim Palace and its destruction.

The building has served as a Kurhaus since 1936. Today, in addition to housing a restaurant (the Kurpark-Hotel's restaurant) and event rooms, it also contains the Bad Dürkheim casino, which is a branch of the Bad Neuenahr casino.

On 7 June 1829, King Ludwig I of Bavaria and his wife, Queen Therese, visited the town, where they were received in front of today's Kurhaus by the district president, Joseph von Stichaner, along with General Karl August von Beckers zu Westerstetten. As they entered the building, flowers were scattered on the entrance steps. The royal couple dined in the house and greeted the citizens from the balcony above the main entrance.

== Building structure ==
According to a surviving drawing, the palace was a long, two-story building with 23 window bays and a raised central projection with a triangular gable. Side wings were later added to the right and left, which were expanded again after 1779. These and the central part of the main building had Mansard roofs. To the north, the steeply sloping former city wall enclosed the site, and the still-preserved garden pavilion was built atop it. To the east of the palace was a large, park-like garden, laid out in the English landscape style in 1762, which also included an orangery with a greenhouse. This area is now the Kurpark. A broad, rising avenue led from the east to the palace.

Today, the garden pavilion and the elevated city wall with a Baroque inscription are the remaining structures of the palace. In the Kurpark, there is a group of putti, likely part of the original palace park. In front of the Fitz-Ritter Winery at Weinstraße Nord 51 in Bad Dürkheim, there is a round, Baroque sandstone guardhouse that was moved from the nearby palace ruins. Another similar structure is located in the Leininger Lehnshof in Herxheim am Berg, which also originated from Dürkheim Palace.

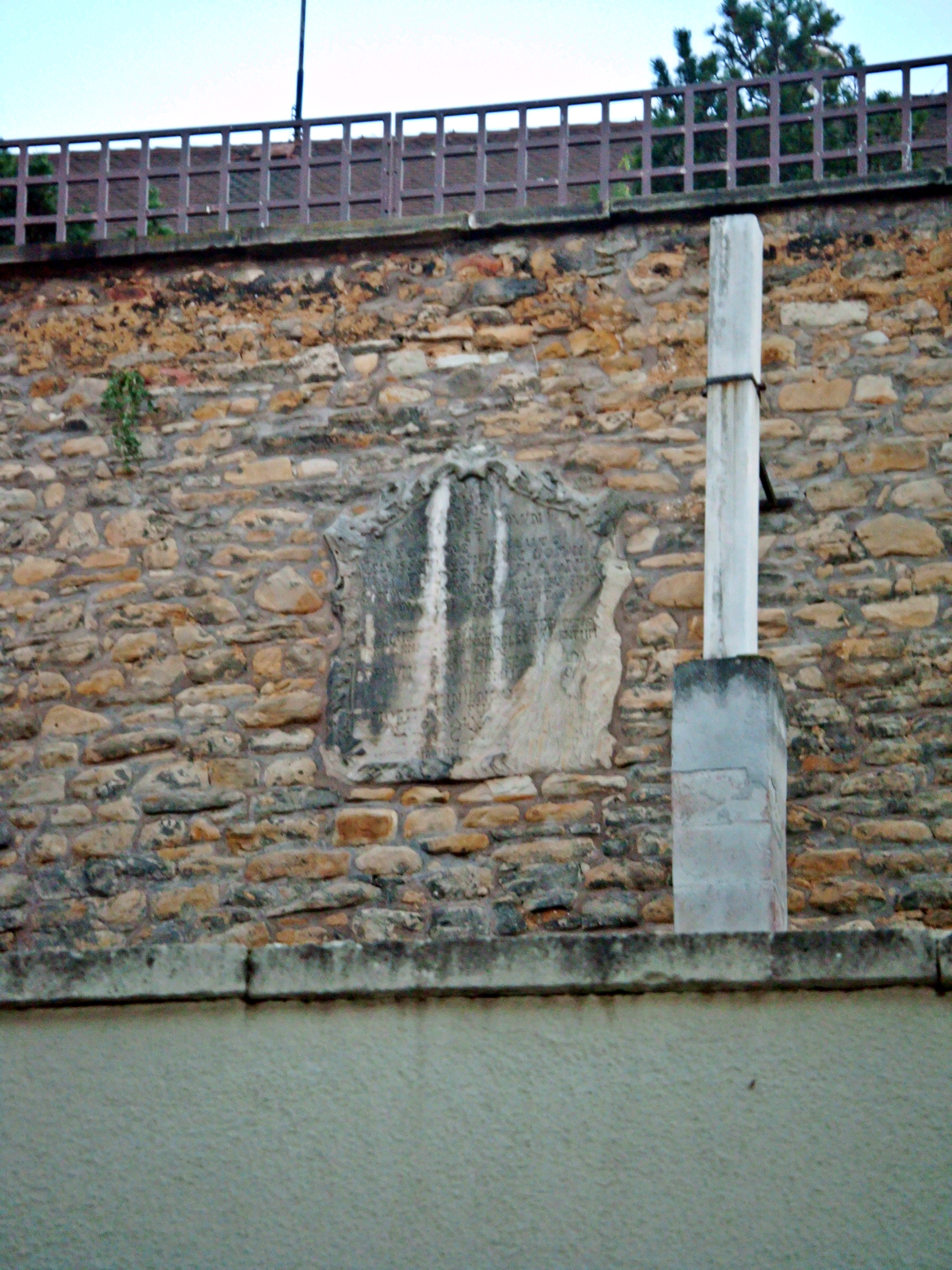
The northern boundary wall of the palace grounds, featuring a Baroque construction inscription, located beneath the present-day Kurpark-Hotel.

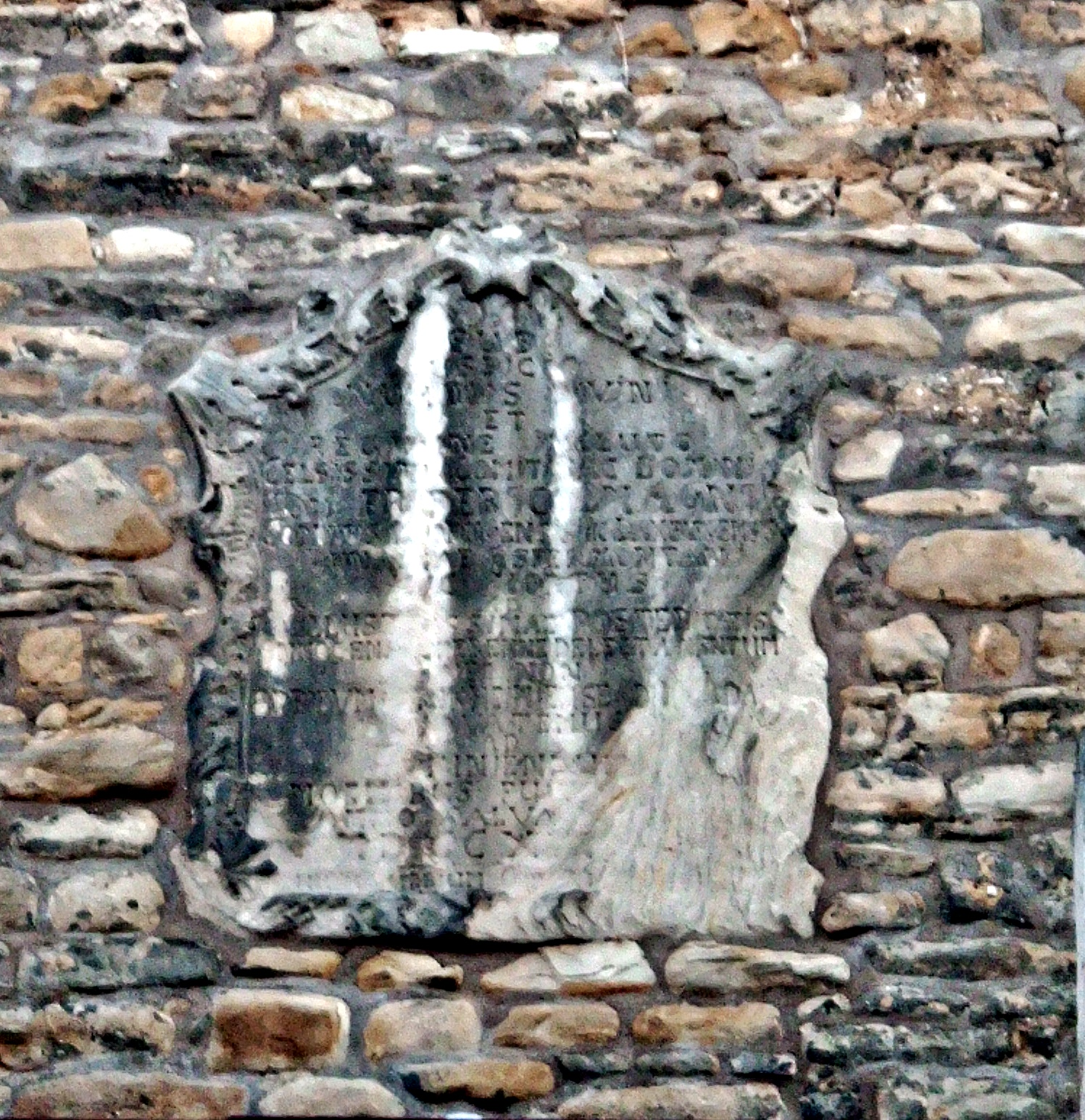
Baroque inscription

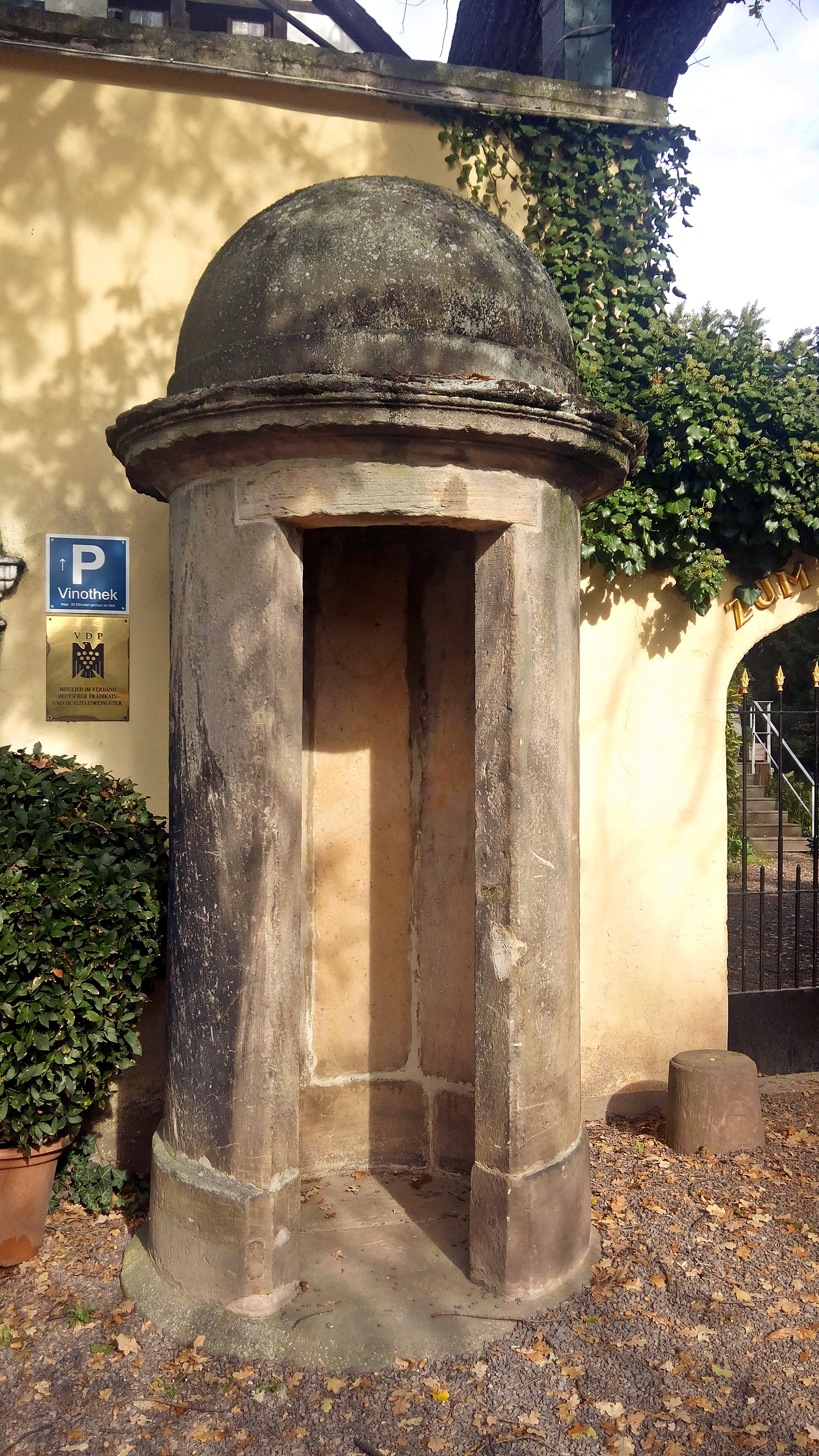
One of the former palace guard houses at Fitz-Ritter Winery in Bad Dürkheim

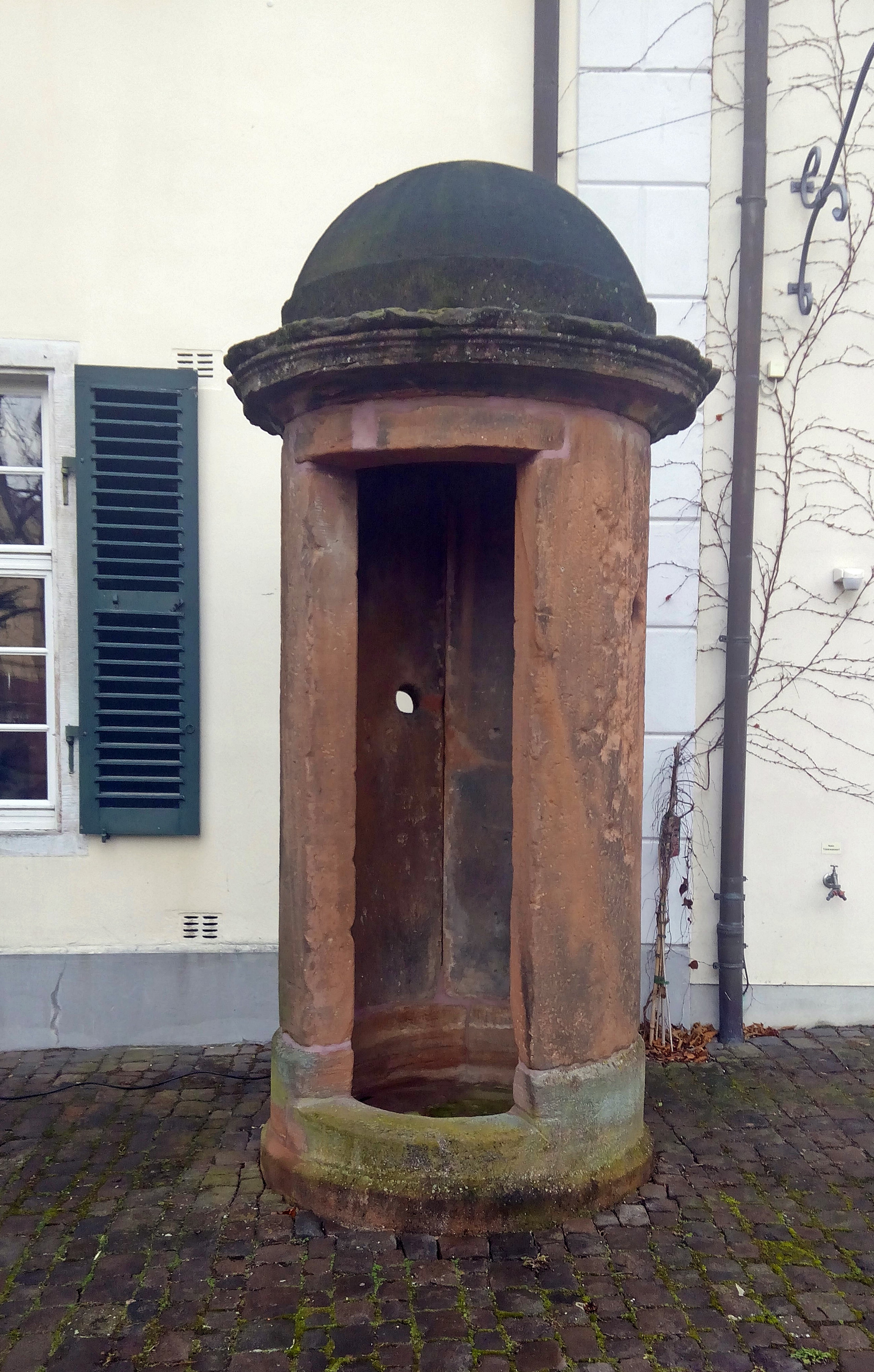
The other guard house in Herxheim am Berg

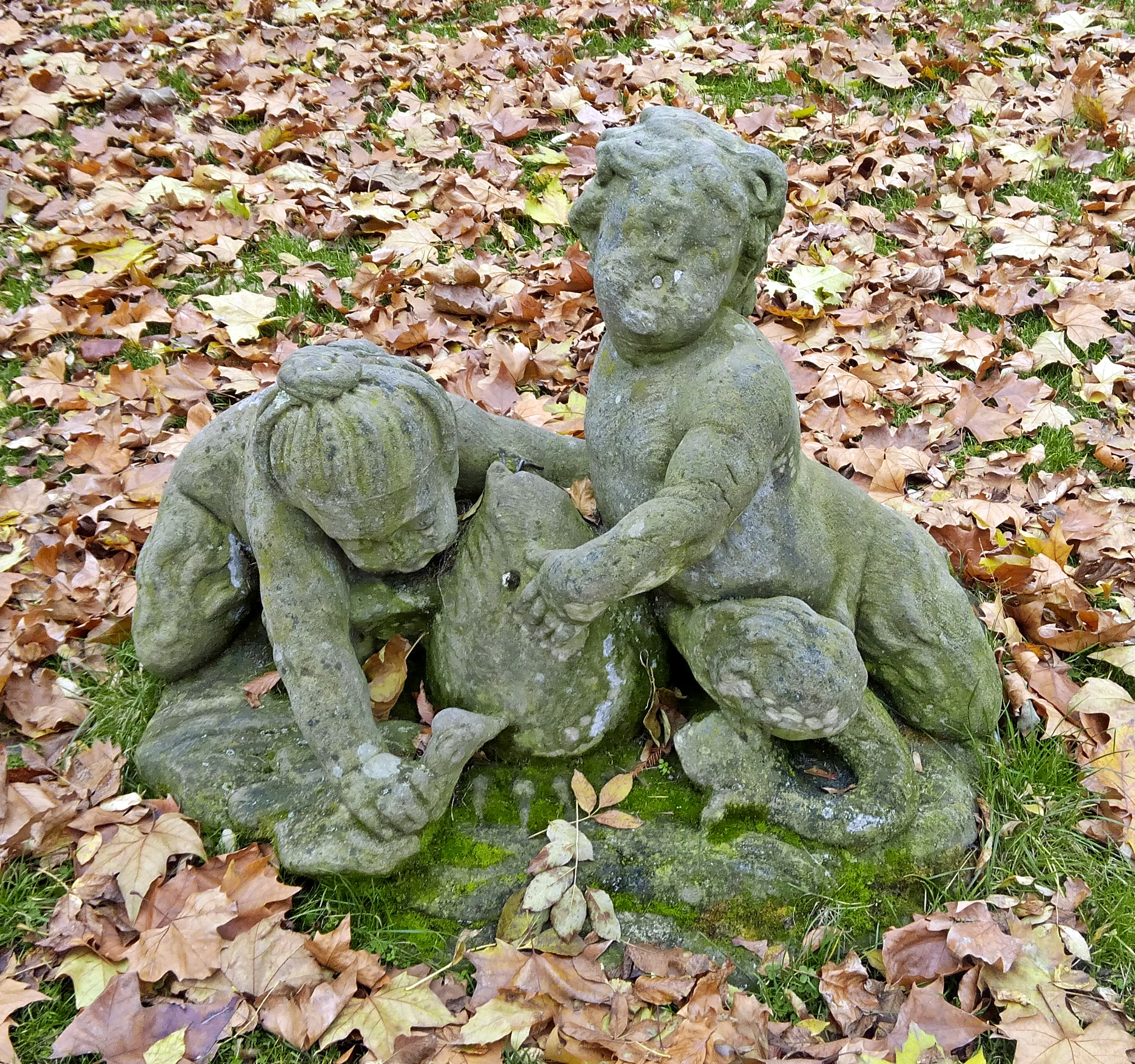
Baroque Group of Putti in the Kurpark

== Panorama of Dürkheim ==
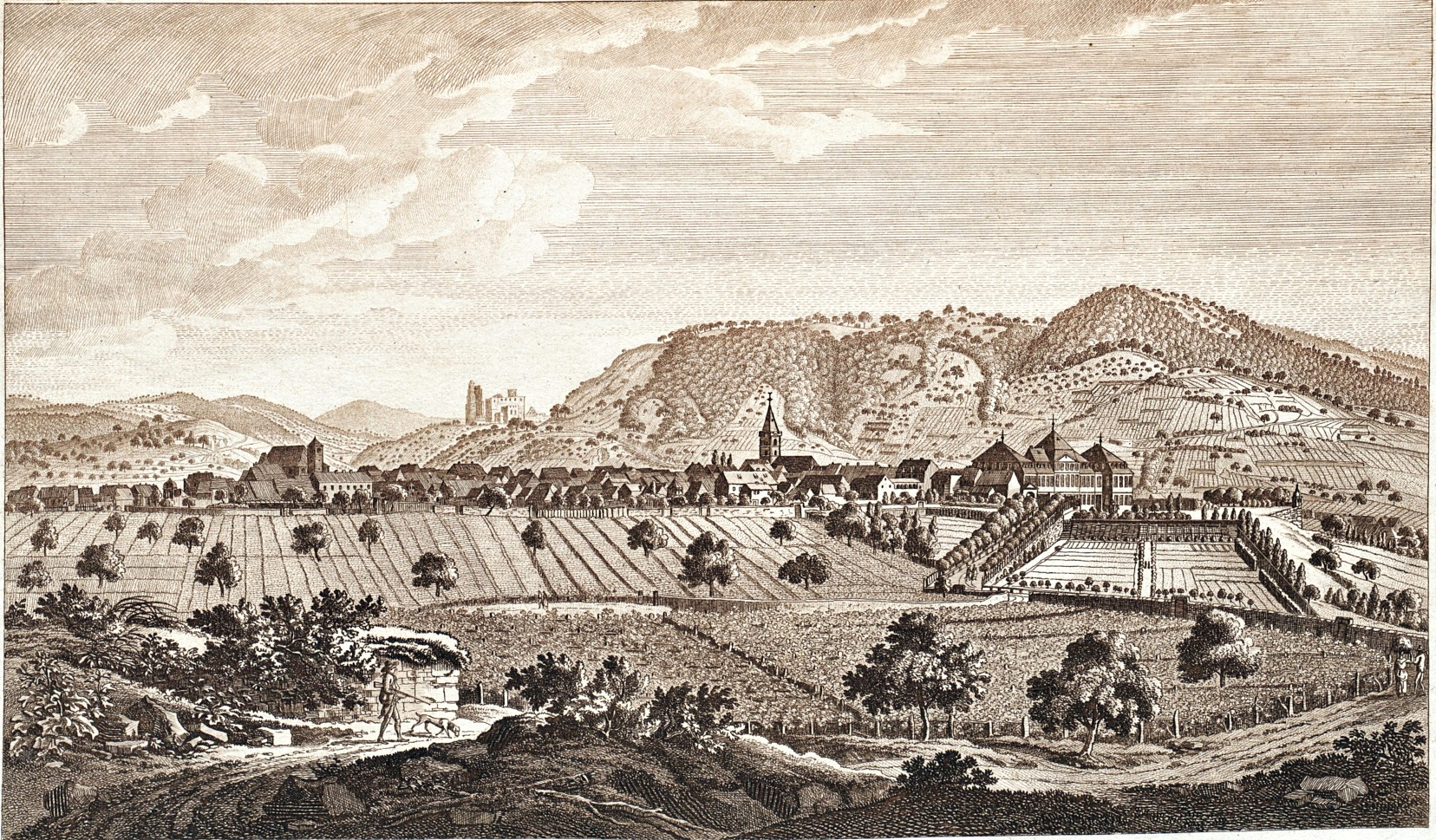
Bad Dürkheim in the 18th century with the palace of the princes of Leiningen to the right
