= Maria Caterina Brignole =

Princess of Monaco from 1757 to 1770

- Princess of Condé
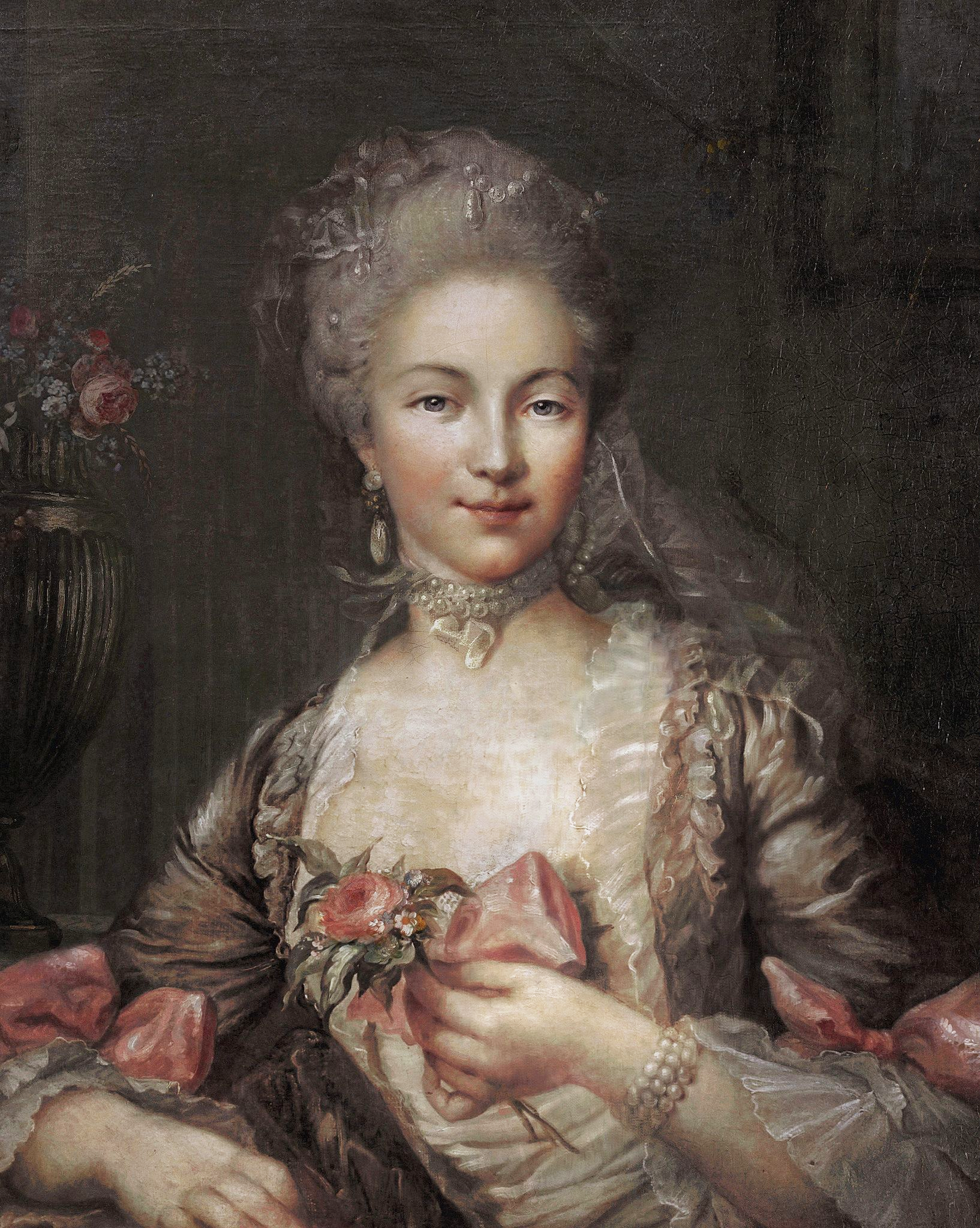
- Portrait by unknown, 18th century

Princess consort of Monaco
- Tenure: 1757–1770
- Born: 7 October 1737; Palazzo Rosso, Genoa
- Died: 18 March 1813 (aged 75); Wimbledon House, Wimbledon, London, United Kingdom of Great Britain and Ireland
- Burial: 5 April 1813; St Aloysius Church, Somers Town, London
- Spouses: Honoré III, Prince of Monaco (m. 1757; died 1795) Louis Joseph, Prince of Condé (m. 1798)
- Issue: Honoré IV, Prince of Monaco; Prince Joseph of Monaco
Names
- Maria Caterina Brignole Sale
- Father: Giuseppe Brignole
- Mother: Maria Anna Balbi

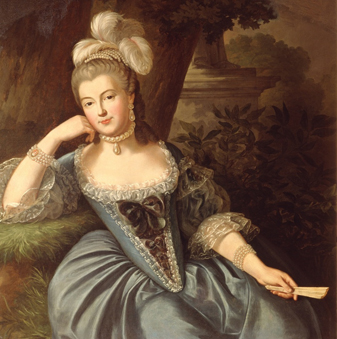
Maria Caterina Brignole-Sale, Princess of Monaco

Coat of arms of Maria Caterina as Princess of Monaco

Maria Caterina Brignole (or Marie-Christine de Brignole; 7 October 1737 – 18 March 1813) was Princess of Monaco by marriage to Prince Honoré III.

Maria Caterina separated from her husband in 1770. Honoré died in 1795, and in 1798, she married Louis Joseph, Prince of Condé.

== Life ==
=== Early life ===
Born into the illustrious House of Brignole-Sale, Maria Caterina was the daughter of Giuseppe Brignole-Sale, Marquis di Groppoli, and Maria Anna Balbi, daughter of Francesco Maria Balbi, who had been Doge of Genoa in 1732. As her father was the Genovese ambassador to France, Maria Caterina and her mother frequented the salons of Paris and the royal court of Versailles.

In 1755, a marriage was proposed between Maria Caterina and Prince Honoré III of Monaco. Honoré III had previously been the lover of her mother, but wished to marry to provide an heir to his throne, and was attracted by Maria Caterina's beauty.

The Prince had declined many marriage proposals, but was willing to marry Maria Caterina because of her beauty and dowry. Her father, however, disagreed because of the bad reputation of Prince Honoré as well as the prospect of the Prince inheriting his fortune.

=== Princess of Monaco ===
The marriage ceremony took place 15 June 1757 in Genoa per procura without the groom present. Maria Caterina came to Monaco by boat accompanied by a suite of the Genovese nobility. When they arrived, however, Prince Honoré did not come aboard the ship to welcome his bride. When they asked him to do so, he replied that his status as a monarch demanded that she come to him instead. The Genovese entourage answered that Maria Caterina, was a member of a ruling family of the Republic of Genoa (her uncles, Gian Francesco and Rodolfo Brignole-Sale, held the dogeship in, respectively, 1746–48 and 1762–64). and refused to do so. The ship was therefore stranded offshore for several days, until the predicament was resolved by the couple meeting halfway on a bridge between the boat and the shore.

The relationship was at first amicable, and the couple had two sons, Honoré IV, Prince of Monaco (born 17 May 1758) and Prince Joseph (born in 1763). Maria Caterina was described as beautiful and charming and, initially, as truly in love with her spouse.

Honoré III was however not satisfied with his life in Monaco, where the political issues were managed by his uncle the Chevalier de Grimaldi, and in the summer of 1760, he left for Paris and left Maria Caterina behind. When he eventually allowed her to join him in Paris, the marriage deteriorated, with Honoré spending more and more time with his mistress in Normandy. Maria Caterina attended the French royal court and high society life, but was described as an introverted personality who preferred to sit with the elderly during the balls rather than to dance and who did not use make up, but also considered a great beauty. Maria Caterina lived in Matignon, where she spent her days with the Prince de Condé, Louis Joseph de Bourbon, and seldom took part in court life. Honoré became more and more jealous, and demanded that she write down her thoughts for him. Once, she was alone for several hours with a handsome nobleman, who helped her to open a cupboard which had been stuck.

In 1765, it attracted attention in Paris that she was courted by the Prince of Condé, her spouse was informed by his brother's wife Marie Christine de Rouvroy, he returned from his own adultery in Normandy to scold her: when he left, Maria Caterina, who until then had regarded Condé as merely a friend, reportedly responded to Condé's feelings, and they became involved in a love affair. Honoré III and Maria Caterina lived separate lives with their own lovers, and he did not bring her with him during his state visit to London in 1768. By 1769 she had begun to set up a home in the Hôtel de Lassay, an annex of the Prince de Condé's primary residence in Paris, the Palais-Bourbon.

In 1769, Honoré III, who was informed of Maria Caterina's adultery, responded by returning to Paris and openly flaunted his lovers and his adultery, upon which Maria Caterina left Paris to seek asylum in the convent of Visitation in Le Mans under the protection of her uncle, who was the bishop there. Mediation by her mother brought about a temporary reconciliation, but when her father died and left his fortune to his daughter on the condition that her husband should have no access to it, Honoré III threatened to have her sent back to Monaco, upon which Maria Caterina again sought asylum in Le Mans.

=== Mistress of Condé ===
On 9 January 1770, the lover of Maria Caterina, the Prince de Condé, managed to use his influence to obtain a legal separation from her husband and the right to manage her own fortune. Maria Caterina moved in with her lover days after her official separation was approved, and openly lived happily with him in his residence Chateau de Chantilly in Paris. Honoré finally realized his relationship with Maria Caterina was finished and turned his attention to his own lovers. Honoré III eventually accepted the relationship, and she acquired the Chateau de Betz, where Honoré allowed her to meet her sons.

In 1774, due to Maria Caterina's illicit position as Condé's mistress and status as a separated woman, the new French queen, 18-year-old Marie Antoinette, offended Condé by refusing to receive Maria Caterina at court. Around 1774, Condé and Maria Caterina began the construction of the Hôtel de Monaco, to be her permanent home in Paris. It was in the rue Saint-Dominique, near the Palais Bourbon, and was completed in 1777.

=== Exile ===
Maria lived with Condé in France until the outbreak of the French Revolution in 1789, when the couple left for Germany.

In 1791, she lived with Condé in Koblenz, where she was one of the leading ladies of the French exile émigrée court, termed as one of the 'Queens of the Emigration' along with the mistress of the count of Provence, Anne de Balbi, and the mistress of the count of Artois, Louise de Polastron. The prince was the leader of the Condé army of émigrés. She used her great fortune to help finance the exiled French community's armed resistance. The émigrée court at Koblenz was dissolved in 1792, and the couple left for Great Britain.

In 1795, Prince Honoré died, and on 24 October 1798 she and the prince de Condé were married in London. The marriage was kept secret for a decade, the couple reportedly only becoming openly known as husband and wife as of 26 December 1808.

She suffered swelling in her legs at a party given by the Prince Regent at Carlton House and died at Wimbledon House in Wimbledon on 28 March 1813. Her body was laid out in state in one of the rooms and she was buried at the French émigré chapel, St Aloysius Church in Somers Town, London on 4 April.

== Ancestry ==
Ancestors of Maria Caterina Brignole

16. Antonio Giulio Brignole Sale, 2nd Marchese di Groppoli
8. Giovanni Francesco Brignole Sale, 4th Marchese di Groppoli
17. Paola Maria Adorno
4. Anton Giulio Brignole Sale, 5th Marchese di Groppoli
18. Giuseppe Maria Durazzo
9. Maria Anna Durazzo
19. Francesca Balbi
2. Giuseppe Maria Brignole Sale, 7th Marchese di Groppoli
20. Giovanni Battista Brignole Sale
10. Giovanni Giacomo Brignole Sale
21. Isabella Raggi
5. Isabella Brignole Sale
22. Angelo Pallavicini
11. Lucrezia Pallavicini
23. Anna Raggi
1. Maria Caterina Brignole
24. Francesco Balbi
12. Giacomo Balbi
25. Barbara Airoli
6. Francesco Maria Balbi, Doge of Genoa
26. Agostino Pinelli
13. Olimpia Pinelli
3. Maria Anna Balbi
28. Giovanni Domenico Durazzo
14. Giovanni Agostino Durazzo
29. Maria Chiavari
7. Maria Clarice Durazzo
30. Napoleone Spinola
15. Maddalena Spinola
31. Agata Girolama Brignole Sale

== Sources ==
This page is a translation of its French equivalent unless otherwise noted.

- Braham, Allan (1980). The architecture of the French enlightenment, pp. 210–219. Berkeley, California: University of California Press. ISBN 978-0-520-04117-2. Limited view at Google Books.

Monegasque royalty
Vacant Title last held by Jacques Goyon de Matignon as prince consort	Princess consort of Monaco; 1757–1770	Vacant Title next held by Maria Caroline Gibert de Lametz
