= Raffaele de Ferrari =

Italian philanthropist and politician

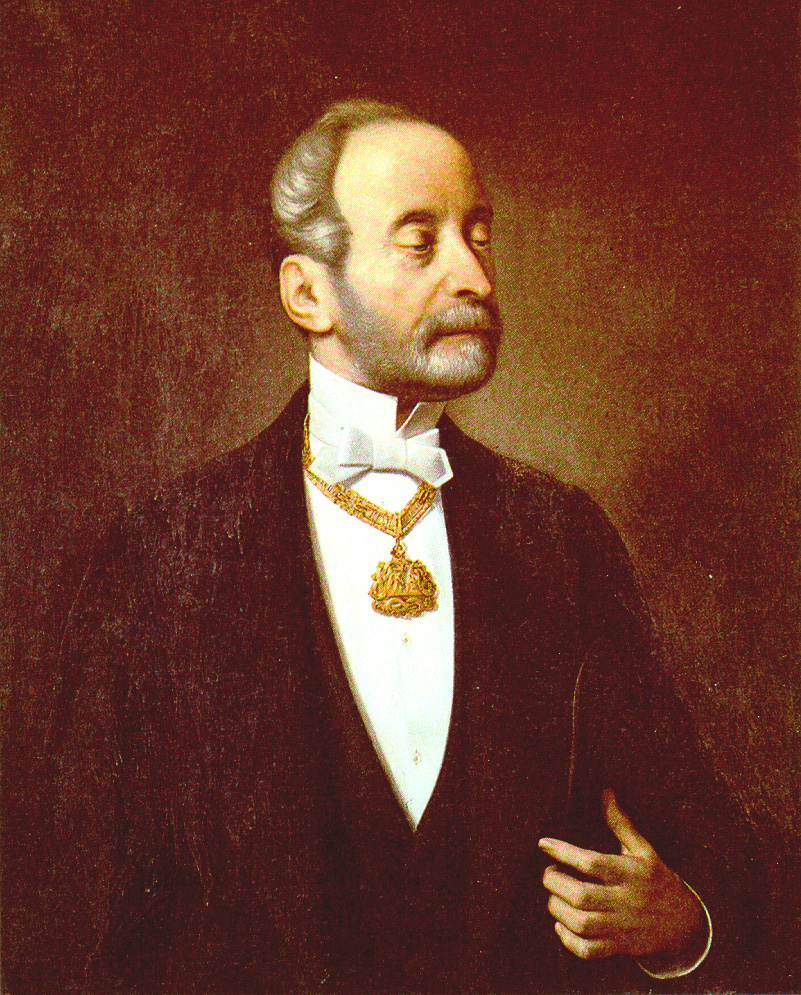
Luigi Raffaele De Ferrari (1876) by Giuseppe Isola

Marquis Raffaele Luigi De Ferrari, Prince of Lucedio, Duke of Galliera (6 July 1803 – 23 November 1876) was an Italian philanthropist and politician.

Raffaele was born at Genoa from an aristocratic family, the third child of Andrea de Ferrari and Livia Pallavicino. His father died in January 1828 when Raffaele was twenty years old and he inherited the family estate. He was a senator of the Kingdom of Sardinia and had the title of Duke of Galliera from 18 September 1838 at the behest of Pope Gregory XVI. The title was recognized by King Charles Albert of Sardinia on 18 July 1843, he was also created Prince of Lucedio.

Raffaele made his economic fortune in Paris, where he lived most of the time.

== Marriage and family ==
Coat of arms of Raffaele de Ferrari

He married in 1828 to Maria Brignole-Sale (1811–1888), daughter of Marquis Antoine Brignole-Sale and Marquise Arthemisa Negrone, of Genoa.

They had three children:

- Livia (1828–1829)
- Andrea (1831–1847)
- Philipp (1850–1917), an eccentric stamp collector, who at the death of his father, refused to inherit his fortune and the title of Duke to which he was entitled.

== Duke of Galliera ==
His biographical profile as a politician and patron is traced in the memorial service made to the Senate on 27 December 1876. In it he remembered how in 1837 he acquired by Prince Oscar, who later became King of Sweden, and his wife Josephine of Leuchtenberg (daughter of Eugène de Beauharnais), all possessions which Emperor Napoleon I of France granted in 1812.

== Honours ==
- Grand Officer of the Order of Saints Maurice and Lazarus, 13 January 1856.
- Grand Cordon of the Order of Saints Maurice and Lazarus, 3 August 1862.
- Knight of the Supreme Order of the Most Holy Annunciation, 8 December 1875.
- Grand Officer of the Order of the Crown of Italy

== Notes and sources ==
Italian nobility
Preceded by Josephine and Oscar	Duke of Galliera; 18 September 1838 – 23 November 1876	Succeeded by Maria Brignole-Sale
