= Chiostro del Bramante =

Italian Renaissance building in Rome

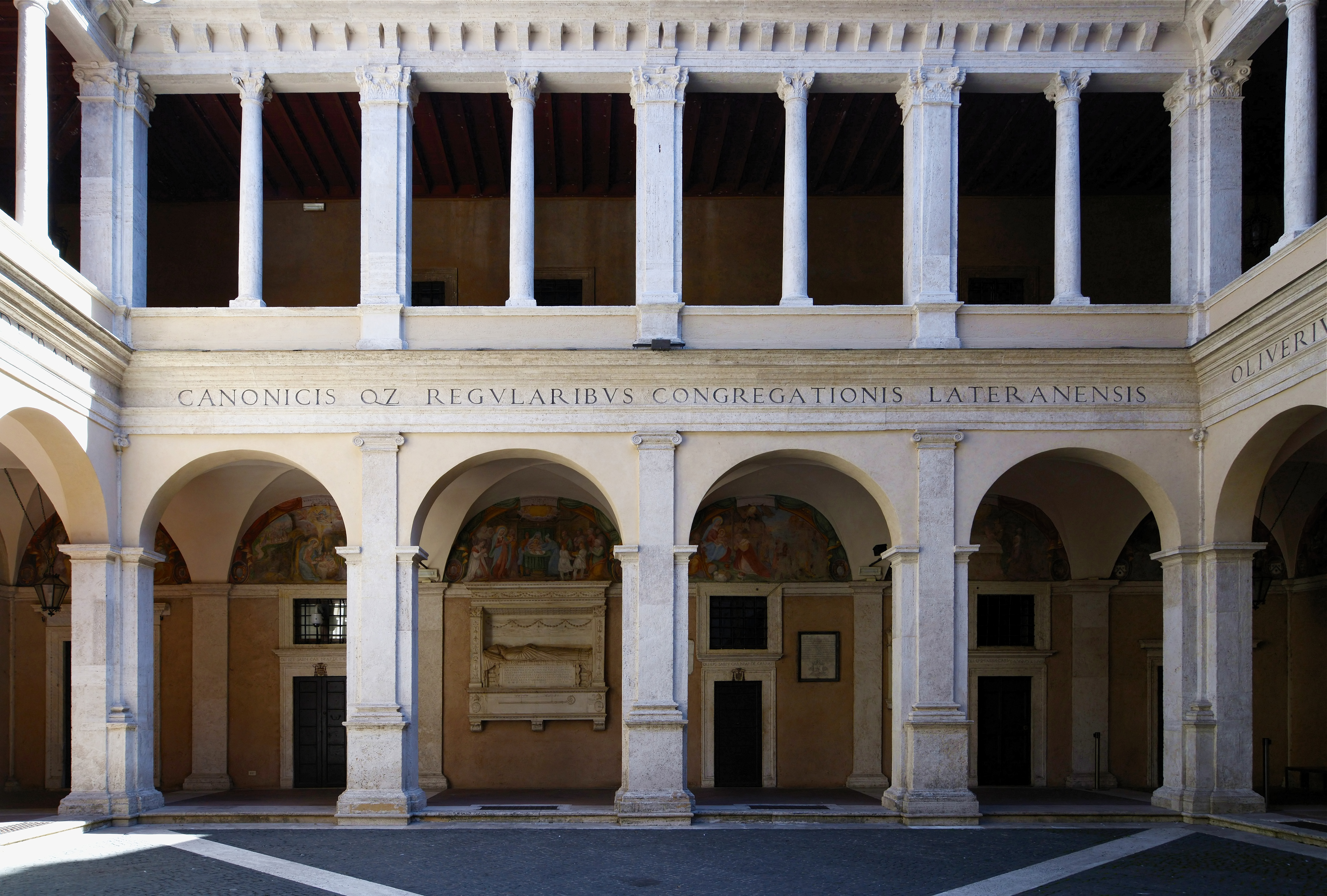
- The cloister’s Renaissance courtyard

- Location in Rome

General information
- Type: Monastic cloister (now cultural center)
- Architectural style: Renaissance
- Location: Arco della Pace 5, Rome, Italy
- Coordinates: 41.9008°N 12.4724°E
- Current tenants: Chiostro del Bramante Foundation (art exhibitions, cultural events)
- Construction started: c. 1500
- Completed: 1504
- Client: Oliviero Carafa
- Owner: Santa Maria della Pace (historically), now private foundation

Technical details
- Material: Brick, marble, fresco

Design and construction
- Architect: Donato Bramante

Website
- chiostrodelbramante.it

The Chiostro del Bramante (Cloisters of Bramante) is an Italian Renaissance building in Rome, commissioned by Cardinal Oliviero Carafa in around 1500, and designed by the architect Donato Bramante.

Today the building serves as a space for exhibitions, meetings and concerts. A cafe and bookshop are housed within the building. A fresco painting by Raphael, The Sibyls in the next-door church of Santa Maria della Pace, is visible from the first floor.
