= Giuseppe Antonio Sala =

Italian cardinal

His Eminence Giuseppe Antonio Sala
- Prefect of the Congregation of Bishops and Regulars
- Church: Roman Catholic Church
- Appointed: 21 November 1834
- Term ended: 23 June 1839
- Predecessor: Carlo Odescalchi
- Successor: Costantino Patrizi Naro
- Other posts: Cardinal-Priest of Santa Maria della Pace (1832-39); Prefect of the Congregation of the Index (1834-39); Archpriest of Santa Maria Maggiore (1838-39)

Orders
- Created cardinal: 30 September 1831 by Pope Gregory XVI
- Rank: Cardinal-Priest

Personal details
- Born: Giuseppe Antonio Sala; 27 October 1762 Rome, Papal States
- Died: 23 June 1839 (aged 76) Rome, Papal States
- Buried: Santa Maria della Pace
- Parents: Giuseppe Antonio Maria Sala; Ana Sacchetti
- Education: Collegio Romano

Giuseppe Antonio Sala (27 October 1762 – 23 June 1839) was an Italian cardinal of the Catholic Church who served in numerous high-profile positions in the Roman Curia.

== Early life ==
Giuseppe Antonio Sala was born on 27 October 1762 in Rome to Giuseppe Antonio Maria Sala and Ana Sacchetti; he had six siblings. He was educated in philosophy at the Pontifical Gregorian University and in theology at the Dominican faculty at the Santa Maria Sopra Minerva, where he received a doctorate in theology in 1761.

Sala was the Secretary to the papal legation to France from 1801 to 1804, and was involved in the negotiations between the Holy See and the post-Revolutionary French Republic that resulted in the Concordat of 1801. He was also Secretary to the papal legation established by Pope Pius VII in 1809 during his exile from Rome. He was appointed the Secretary of the Sacred Congregation for Extraordinary Ecclesiastical Affairs and of the Reform in 1814, as the Secretary of the Sacred Congregation of Rites and the Tridentine Council in December 1825.

== Cardinal ==
Sala was created a cardinal by Pope Gregory XVI in the consistory on September 30, 1831, and was given the titular church of Santa Maria della Pace on February 24, 1832. On March 21, 1834, he was appointed Prefect of the Sacred Congregation for the Index, and on November 21, 1834, he was named Prefect of the Sacred Congregation for Bishops and Regulars. He was named the archpriest of Santa Maria Maggiore on 11 December 1838. Sala died on 23 June 1839 in Rome, and was interred in the church of Santa Maria della Pace.

== See also ==
- Cardinals created by Gregory XVI

Catholic Church titles
Preceded by Pietro Caprano	Secretary of the Congregation for Extraordinary Ecclesiastical Affairs; 1823—1825	Succeeded by Castruccio Castracane degli Antelminelli
Preceded by —	Secretary of the Sacred Congregation of Rites; 1825—1831	Succeeded by Annibale Capalti
Preceded by Antonio Domenico Gamberini	Secretary of the Sacred Congregation of the Council; 1825—1831	Succeeded by Gerolamo Marquese d'Andrea
Preceded by Carlo Maria Pedicini	Cardinal-priest of Santa Maria della Pace; 1832—1839	Succeeded by Charles Januarius Acton
Preceded by Pietro Caprano	Prefect of the Sacred Congregation for the Index; 1834	Succeeded by Giacomo Giustiniani
Preceded by Carlo Odescalchi	Prefect of the Sacred Congregation for Consultations about Regulars; 1834—1839	Succeeded by Costantino Patrizi Naro
Preceded by Carlo Odescalchi	Archpriest of the Basilica di Santa Maria Maggiore; 1838—1839	Succeeded by Luigi Del Drago
