= Concatenation (architecture) =

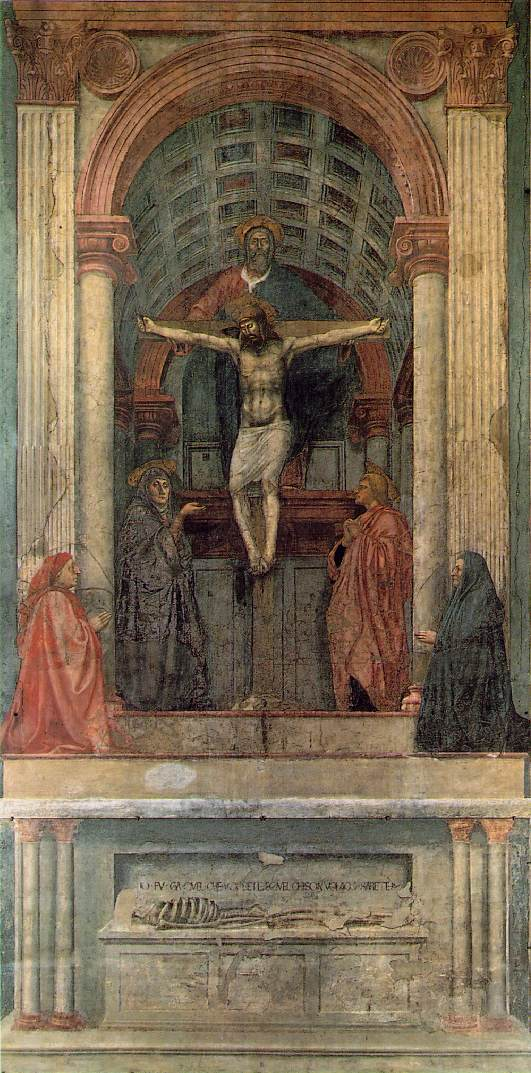
The concatenation of the orders in Masaccio's fresco of the Trinity

The concatenation (enchainement) is an architectural composition that unites chaining parts together—as with separate elements in long façades, with the fronts being brought forward or recessed.

== Overview ==
The concatenation usually articulates the wall by superimposing elements of the architectural order, such as pilasters or engaged columns, inside which a round arch or a series of arches open. Two hierarchical orders are usually superimposed: the minor order supports the arch, which, in turn, is framed under the entablature of the major order. The concatenation is different from the serliana that usually employs a single order on which both the arches and the architrave rest.

== History ==
As an element of architectural language, the concatenation was common in the Roman architecture both in an isolated form (triumphal arches) and in series. It was also widely used in multi-level buildings, such as Colosseum. As a compositional element, it saw new interest in the first half of the 15th century, becoming a fundamental syntagm of the classical architecture. In the Renaissance architecture, the concatenation was widely used in all types of buildings, internal courtyards, and cloisters. William Kent and other Palladians favoured concatenated façades for their articulation.

== Gallery ==
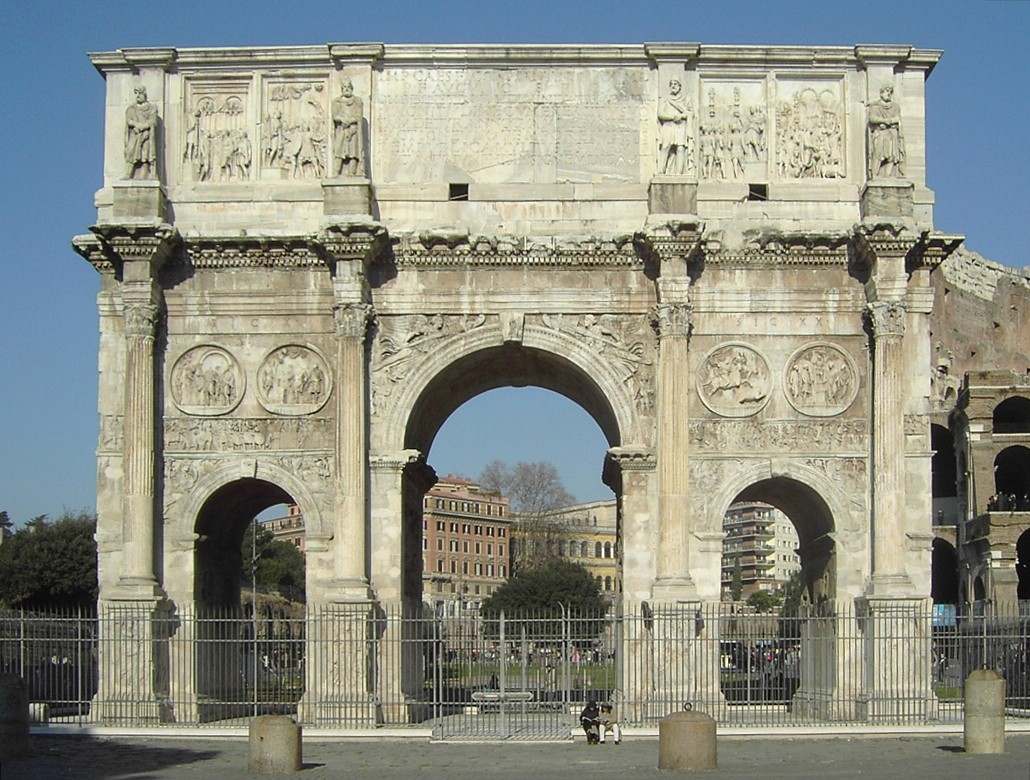
Arch of Constantine, Rome

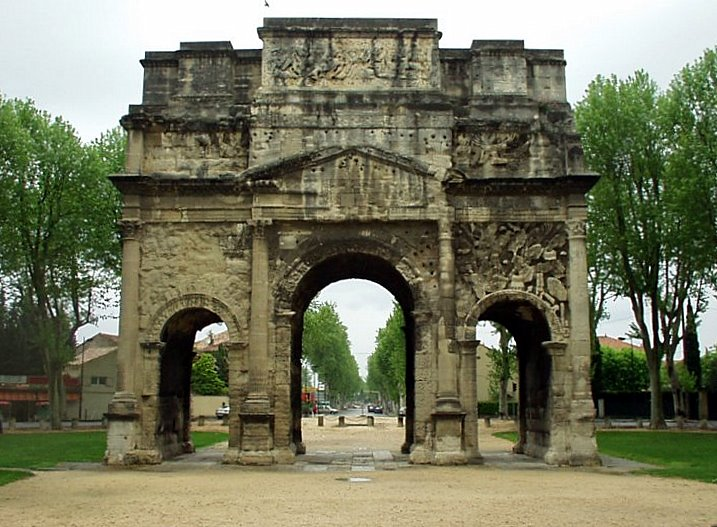
Triumphal Arch of Orange

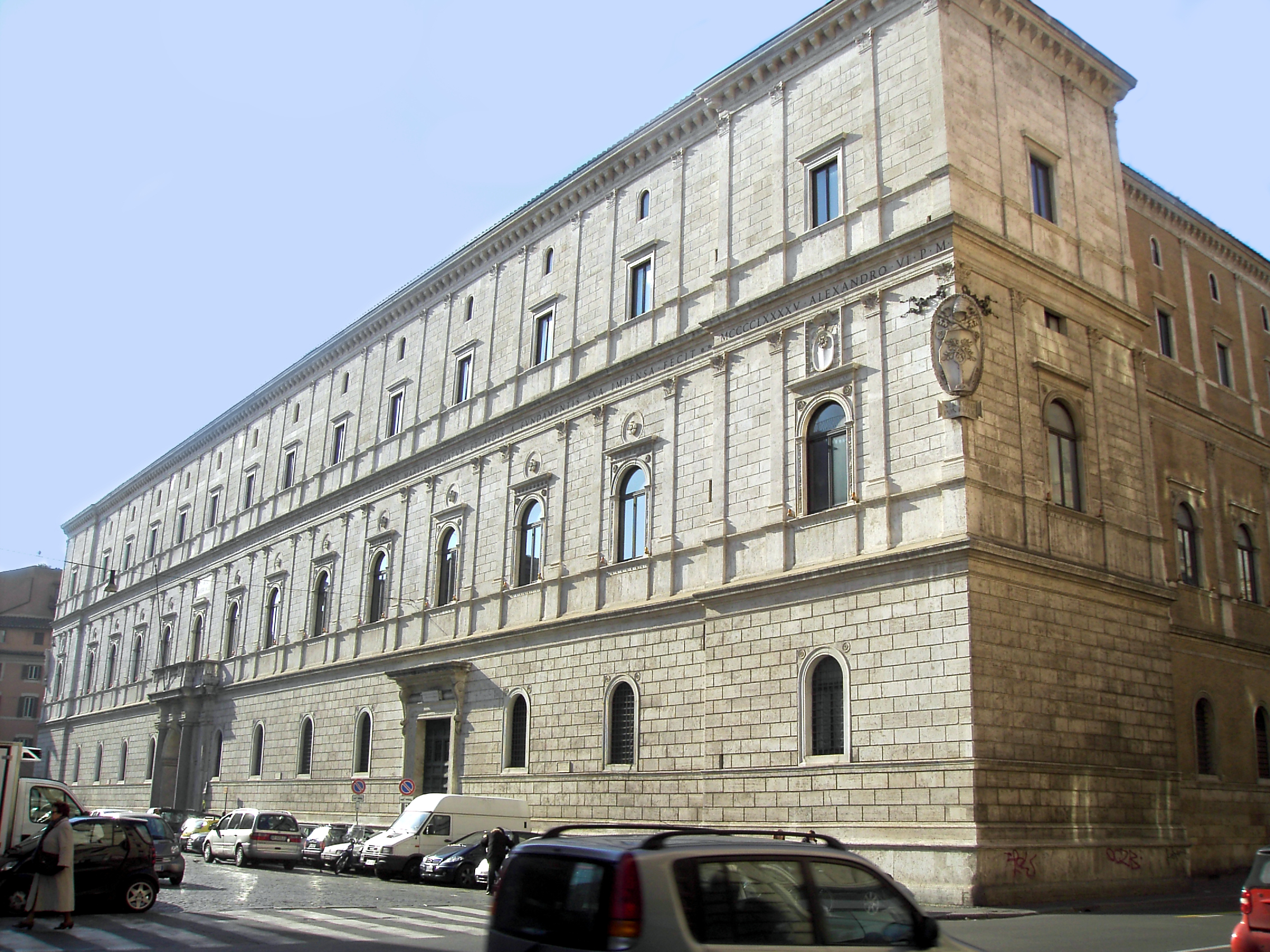
Façade of the Palazzo della Cancelleria in Rome

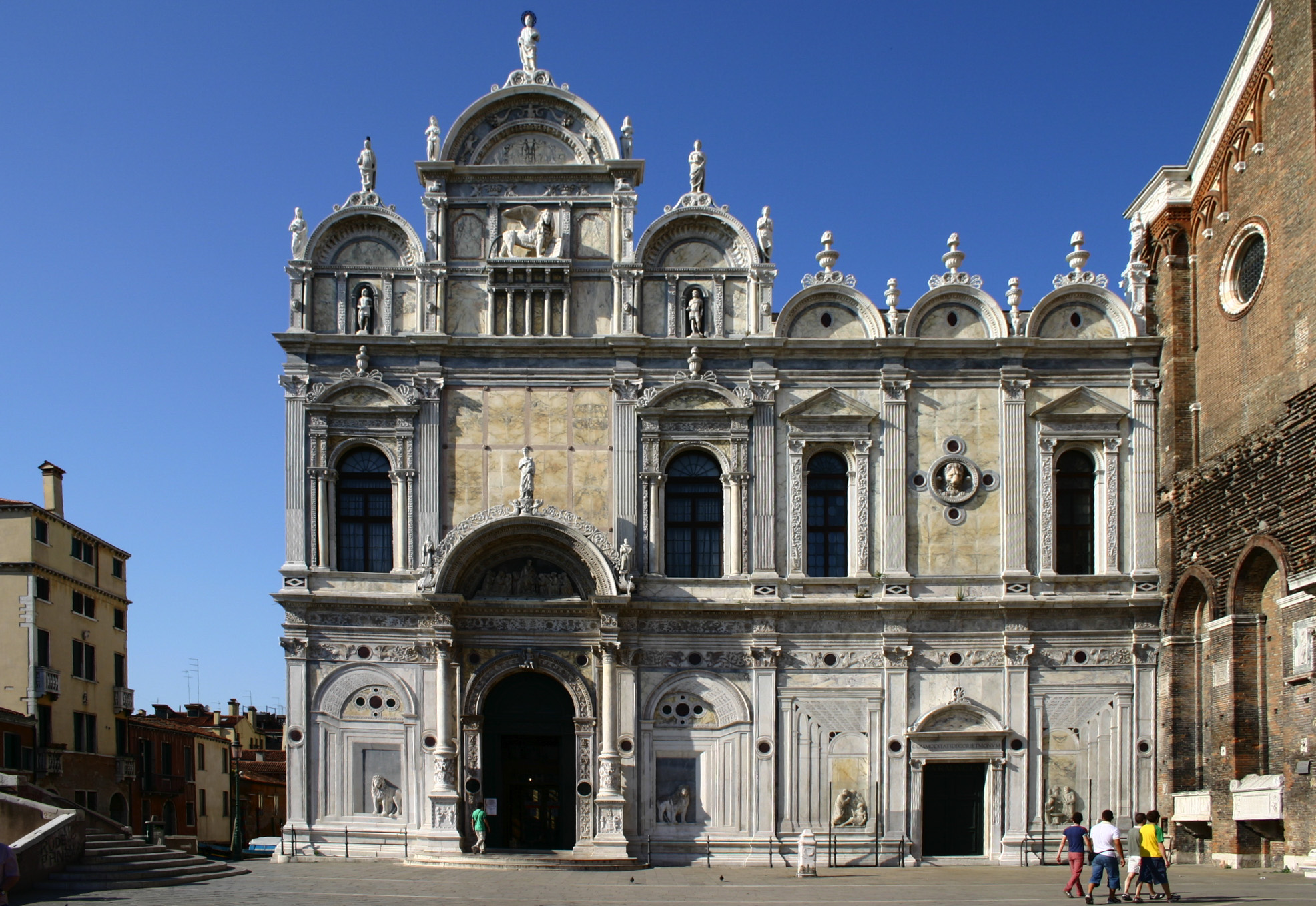
Scuola Grande di San Marco

Cloister of the Convent of Christ, Tomar, Portugal, (1557–1591), Diogo de Torralva and Filippo Terzi.
