= Carlo Odescalchi =

Italian prince and priest (1785–1841)

His Eminence Carlo Odescalchi Servant of God
- Archbishop of Ferrara; Cardinal-Bishop of Sabina
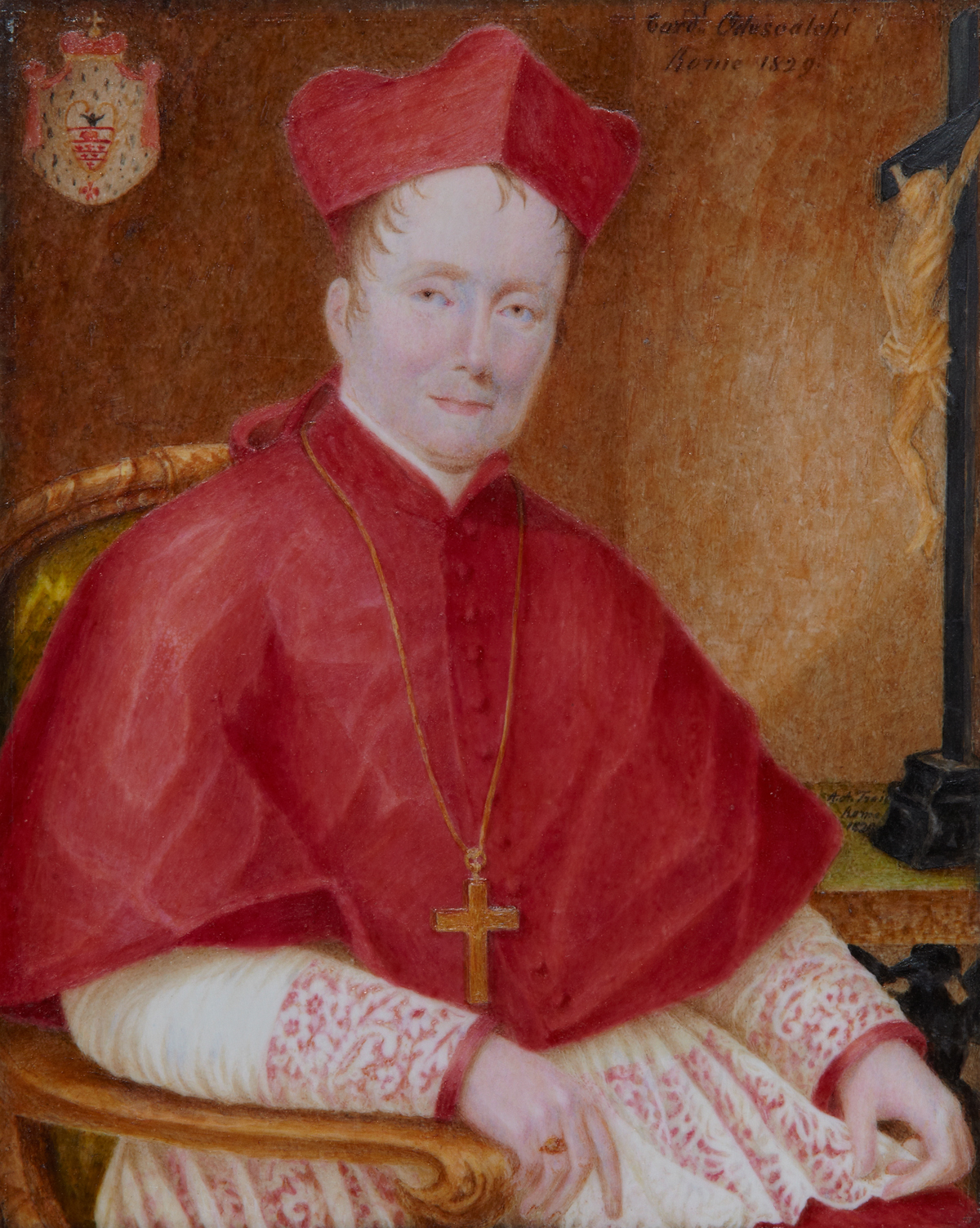
- Portrait in oils by Agnes Xavier Trail
- See: Ferrara, then Sabina
- Appointed: 10 March 1823, then 15 April 1833
- Other posts: Grand Prior of the Sovereign Military Order of Malta; Prefect of the Congregation of Bishops and Regulars

Orders
- Ordination: 31 December 1808 by Marco Agrippa Dandini
- Consecration: 25 May 1823 by Cardinal Giulio Maria della Somaglia, Cardinal Giuseppe della Porta Rodiani, and Cardinal Lorenzo Girolamo Mattei
- Created cardinal: 10 March 1823 by Pope Pius VII
- Rank: Cardinal-bishop

Personal details
- Born: 5 March 1785 Rome, Papal States
- Died: 17 August 1841 (aged 56) Modena, Duchy of Modena and Reggio
- Denomination: Catholic

Carlo Odescalchi SJ (5 March 1785 – 17 August 1841) was an Italian prince and priest, Archbishop of Ferrara, cardinal of the Catholic Church and Vicar General of the Diocese of Rome. For years a close collaborator of popes Pius VII and Gregory XVI, in 1838 he renounced his titles in order to become a Jesuit.

== Early life ==
A great-great-great-grandnephew of Benedetto Odescalchi, who reigned as Pope Innocent XI from 1676 until 1689, Carlo was born in Rome, the second son of the noble Baldassare Odescalchi, 3rd Prince of the Holy Roman Empire Odescalchi and 3rd Duke of Bracciano, Syrmia in the Kingdom of Slavonia and Ceri, and his wife Valeria Caterina Giustiniani of the Princes of Bassano, who also belonged to a family of nobles.

Carlo was first educated at home by his father, but from 1798 to 1800 studied in a seminary in Hungary, where the family lived for a time in exile after fleeing from the invading armies of the French First Consul Napoleon Bonaparte. He had received the clerical tonsure in 1797 and was eventually ordained to the priesthood on 31 December 1808, celebrating his first Mass on the next day, 1 January. Having completed higher studies in Italy, in 1809 he was awarded a doctorate in utroque iure (both canon and civil law). After becoming acquainted with Joseph Pignatelli and subsequent to Pope Pius VII's restoration of the Society of Jesus, he planned on entering the Society and was given preliminary acceptance but gave up the attempt due to the resistance of his sister Vittoria, who desperately sought to live near her brother. Pius VII himself agreed with Vittoria and promised Carlo that he could enter at a more appropriate time, but after Vittoria's marriage three years later, Pius decided to keep Carlo and appointed him papal auditor.

== In Papal service ==
Pius VII, following his release from France, sent Odescalchi to Olomouc in 1815 as a papal legate to Antonín Colloredo-Waldsee, and again in 1819 to bestow the cardinalatial red biretta on Archduke Rudolf of Austria. From 1815 to 1820, Odescalchi served as auditor of the Sacra Rota Romana for Austria, auditor of the pope, and canon of St. Peter's Basilica.

On 10 March 1823, Pius VII appointed Odescalchi the Archbishop of Ferrara and also created him Cardinal Priest with the title of Santi Apostoli. Odescalchi was consecrated a bishop on the following 25 May by Cardinal Giulio Maria della Somaglia, with Cardinals Giuseppe della Porta Rodiani and Lorenzo Mattei serving as co-consecrators. He served as the papal legate for the opening of the holy door of the Lateran Basilica in the 1825 Holy Year.

Odescalchi resigned as Archbishop of Ferrara on 2 July 1826. He was then named the Prefect of the Congregation of Bishops and Regulars on 5 February 1828.

He was later appointed to two cardinal's posts on 15 April 1833: Cardinal Bishop of Sabina (which he resigned on 30 November 1838, along with the post of Prefect of Bishops and Regulars) and Cardinal Priest of San Lorenzo in Damaso (which he resigned on 19 December 1834). In 1837 he ordained Gioacchino Pecci, the future Pope Leo XIII). As a cardinal, Odescalchi participated in the conclaves of 1823, 1829, and 1830–31.

== Jesuit ==
In 1837, Odescalchi submitted to Pope Gregory XVI his resignation from all his offices to enter the Society of Jesus, but the Pope refused. Appointed Grand Prior of the Sovereign Military Order of Malta in Rome, he again asked the Pope to accept his resignation, which Gregory did this time. After abdicating his cardinalate and episcopate in 1838, Odescalchi finally entered the Jesuit Order on 6 December and took the habit on the 8 December, professing his vows on 2 February 1840.

For three years he was much in demand for spiritual retreats to the clergy and rural missions in the Northern part of Italy. The correspondence that followed his death suggests that many considered him a saint.

== Veneration ==
Odescalchi died at the age of 56, on 17 August 1841 at 10:30 a.m., in the San Bartolomeo Jesuit school in Modena, then an independent state, and was buried in the adjoining church of San Bartolomeo. As part of the beatification process, the canonical recognition of the body took place on 31 March 1927.
