= Sibyls (Raphael) =

Fresco by Raphael

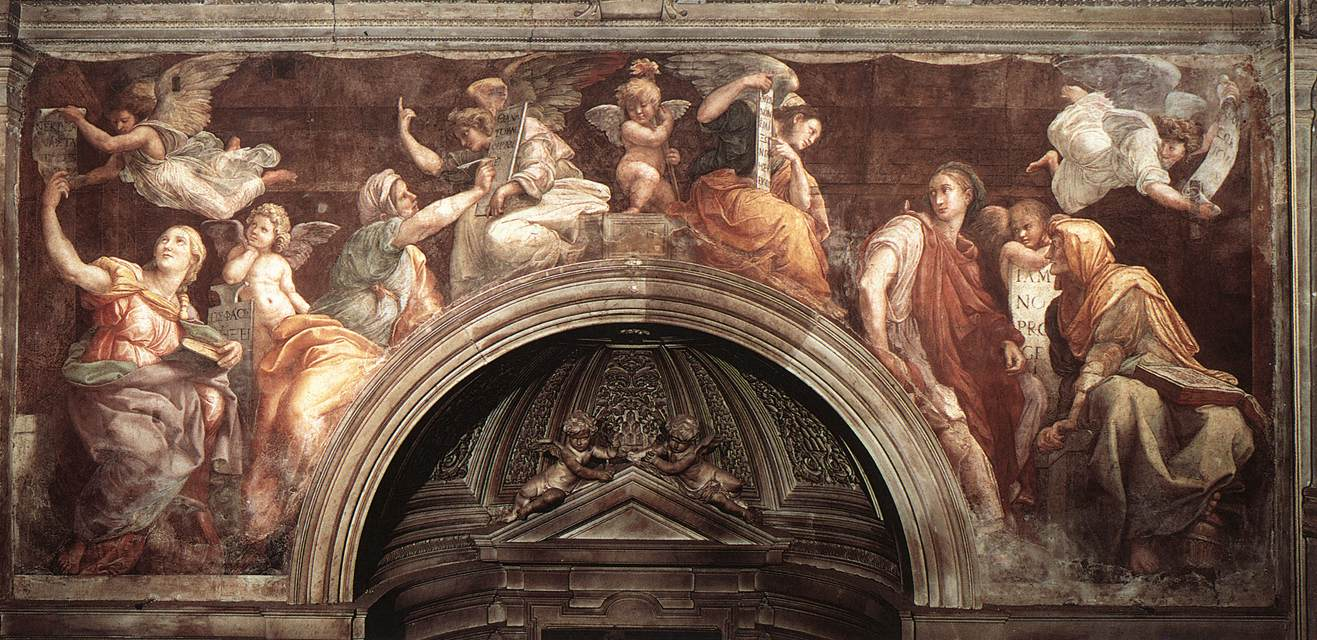
- Artist: Raphael
- Year: 1514
- Type: Fresco
- Location: Santa Maria della Pace; Rome

The Sibyls, or Sibyls receiving instruction from Angels, is a painting by the Italian renaissance artist Raphael. It was painted in 1514, as part of a commission Raphael had received from the Sienese banker Agostino Chigi to decorate the interior of Santa Maria della Pace in Rome.

The painting shows four Sibyls—Cumaean, Persian, Phrygian and Tiburtine—accompanied by attendant angels. Art historian Michael Hirst notes a "striking" parallel between the figures of the Sibyls and the practice sketches of Michelangelo.

== See also ==
- List of paintings by Raphael
