= God's Wonderful Railway =

UK television series

God's Wonderful Railway is a British children's drama television series made by the BBC. It was first shown in eight 30-minute episodes, from 6 February 1980. The cast includes Gorden Kaye, June Brown, Gerard Kelly, Richard Pearson and Terry Molloy.

== Plot ==
The series focuses on three generations of the Grant family working on a Great Western Railway branch line which isn't explicitly named, but stations such as Hampton Loade, Highley and Arley on the Severn Valley Railway are identified. The first section, entitled Permanent Way, depicts the construction of the line in the reign of Queen Victoria, the second, entitled Clear Ahead, shows the line in operation in Edwardian times, and the third, Fire on the Line, is set during the Second World War.

Since the series was made for children, each part of the story focuses on events from the perspective of then younger members of the Grant family. The same characters reappear as adults as the story progresses, but in incidental roles.

"God's Wonderful Railway" was a nickname for the pre-nationalisation Great Western Railway.

== Production ==
The series was written by Avril Rowlands with episodes directed by Fiona Cumming and John Prowse.

The location filming was done on and around the Severn Valley Railway. A reference is made to the area in the music for the opening and closing credits: a version of the first movement of Elgar's The Severn Suite arranged for brass band by David Lyon.

== List of episodes ==
Episode number	Title	Synopsis
1	The Permanent Way Part 1	1860, and Robbie Grant injures his leg placing explosive fuses in an embankment while working as a Navvy with his father Giant while local farmers oppose the new railway. Engineer John Fowler has high expectations of manager Henry Bridgman and low expectations of the navvies on payday. Robbie has to prove himself in the sight of the other navvies, as he gets to know their landlady Martha's niece Deborah.
2	The Permanent Way Part 2	Engineer of the line Mr Fowler offers Robbie a job, and Deborah teaches him to read and write. Giant plans to seek Martha's hand in marriage. Tragedy strikes and Robbie wants to leave instead of taking his job at Hampton Loade.
3	Clear Ahead Part 1	46 years on, and in 1906, Highley Signalman Robbie has just lost his wife Deborah. Daughter Jane persuades him to move in with her and his grandson George, overweight, innocent, clumsy and scared of his mother and his grandfather, and is about to start work as a lad porter at the station under the redoubtable Albert Jellicoe, while best friend Ted Jarvis starts as an engine cleaner.
4	Clear Ahead Part 2	Jane sends George with a mug of tea for Robbie, who tells him that the trouble he has had today will pass, and so will Mr Jellicoe's anger. Ted tells George that if he has any trouble with Mr Jellicoe to ask how his wife is. George meets Annie, a young lady going into service as under-kitchen maid for William Crowhurst and carries her trunk to his house. Mr Holmes asks George to cover for him for an hour, and George is asked for a special train to Shrewsbury for the King.
5	Clear Ahead Part 3	George runs for Mr Jellicoe, who is fishing on his day off. Mr Holmes returns in time to help George look for carpet in Mr Jellicoe's attic, and George also finds bunting from the Queen's Diamond Jubilee in 1897 to decorate the station for the Royal Train which is being cleaned by Ted Jarvis. Jane tells George how pleased she is with how George handled the situation with the King, and Mr Allen, general Superintendent of the line, inspects the station to surprise Robbie with a watch for his long service for the company and the staff a bonus for their handling of the royal train. Annie breaks his heart by introducing her fiancé Walter. George is promoted as a new lad porter joins the staff and Mr Holmes catches the train to his new station, wishing him luck.
6	Fire on the Line Part 1	1939, George is now station master at Arley, and Ted is a train driver giving George's son Andy footplate rides on the way home from school. George is married to Elsie and they also have Andy's big sister Marj. Andy is excited that Ted is going to let him come on the pick-up goods the next day, but Elsie is less than enthusiastic about Andy's plans to be an engine driver. The Second World War begins, Marj cycles into a young man, Andy spots an LMS loco travelling through the station, and the next day Andy has a treat as Ted lets him travel to school on the footplate of a Manor class loco. However, the arrival of evacuee Alice is about to turn Andy's life upside down, starting with his beloved model railway.
7	Fire on the Line Part 2	Marj is surprised to learn that the teacher who accompanied Alice and the other evacuees, Geoffrey Green, is the young man. Andy shows Alice round the station with no enthusiasm and learns of her home in Edgbaston, brothers, sisters and pets. Andy teases Marj for going on a nature ramble with Geoffrey and the other children, but Elsie makes him join the ramble. Cycling away from the ramble, Andy goes down to the engine shed where Ted tells him that he can't visit the engine shed or get footplate rides any more because of the war. Alice finds an Andy upset about his mum's opposition to his engine driver dreams and everything that has changed in the last few weeks and tells him the truth - she was jealous of him because she has no family or pets, only an "Auntie" Glad and they live in Sparkbrook rather than Edgbaston. After an air raid during a dance, Marj discovers Geoffrey has been writing numbers down in his notebook, and George tells Andy why the Severn Valley Railway is so important to the war – it allows trains to bypass all the big cities.
8	Fire on the Line Part 3	Ted tells Elsie and Andy how they had dug into a bombed house where they heard a voice - it was a parrot. After school, Andy takes Alice fishing. They see Geoffrey using binoculars and writing in his notebook, and follow him as he stops at his lodgings then takes Marj to the cinema where he tells her about seeing a hen harrier before a passing train disturbed it. Not knowing that Geoffrey is a birdwatcher, Andy tells George, who agrees to tell Sergeant Jones. The next day Geoffrey is arrested, and a wrathful Marj tells Andy that she isn't his sister and he doesn't belong to any of them. Andy runs away - Alice chases after him but trips over what turns out to be a bomb. Andy and Alice climb the viaduct to run along the track for help, thinking there are no trains. Elsie, Marj and George search for Andy round the station before Geoffrey is released, and George joins Ted on the footplate of the troop train, Andy flags down the train, the soldiers defuse the bomb, George tells Andy the truth about how they found him in a first class carriage, and Ted takes the heroes home on the footplate.

== Cast ==
=== Series 1 ===
- Giant Grant - Brian Coburn
- Robbie Grant - Gerard Kelly
- Martha - Anne Kristen
- Deborah - Anne Burns
- Spider - Brian Grellis
- Green Eye - Ralph Arliss
- Rusty - Craig Stokes
- Jem - Gorden Kaye
- Scarecrow - Max Faulkner
- Shorty - Eugene Geasley
- John Fowler - Hugh Dickson
- Henry Bridgman - Albert Shepherd
- Fight Arranger - Terry Walsh
- Reporter - Steve Hodson
- Mr Hartwell - John Rapley

=== Series 2 ===
- George Grant - Ian Sandy
- Jane Grant - Shirley Cain
- Robbie Grant - John Barrett
- Vicar - Roger Hume
- Ted Jarvis - Dale Bayford
- Albert Jellicoe - Richard Pearson
- Davies - Frank Veasey
- Holmes - Ralph Lawton
- Harvey - Terry Pearson
- Fry - Terry Molloy
- Annie - Suzy O'Hara
- Equerry - Blake Butler
- Landlord - Raymond Brooks
- Edward VII - Len Marten
- Mr Colebatch - Lloyd Lamble
- Mr Allen - Arnold Peters
- Walter - Nigel Greaves

=== Series 3 ===
- Andy Grant - Andrew Hughes
- George Grant - Colin Douglas
- Elsie Grant - June Brown
- Marjerie Grant - Annette Ekblom
- Geoffrey Green - Phillip Joseph
- Ted Jarvis - Bill Dean
- Alice Stone - Katherine Roberts
- Sergeant - Jeremy Young

== Other media ==
The series remains available on DVD, as a download on Amazon Prime Video in the UK, and in excerpts on YouTube.

The scripts were adapted into a series of three juvenile fiction books.
