= Hampton Loade Ferry =

Reaction ferry across the River Severn in Shropshire, England

Coordinates: 52.476442°N 2.374442°W

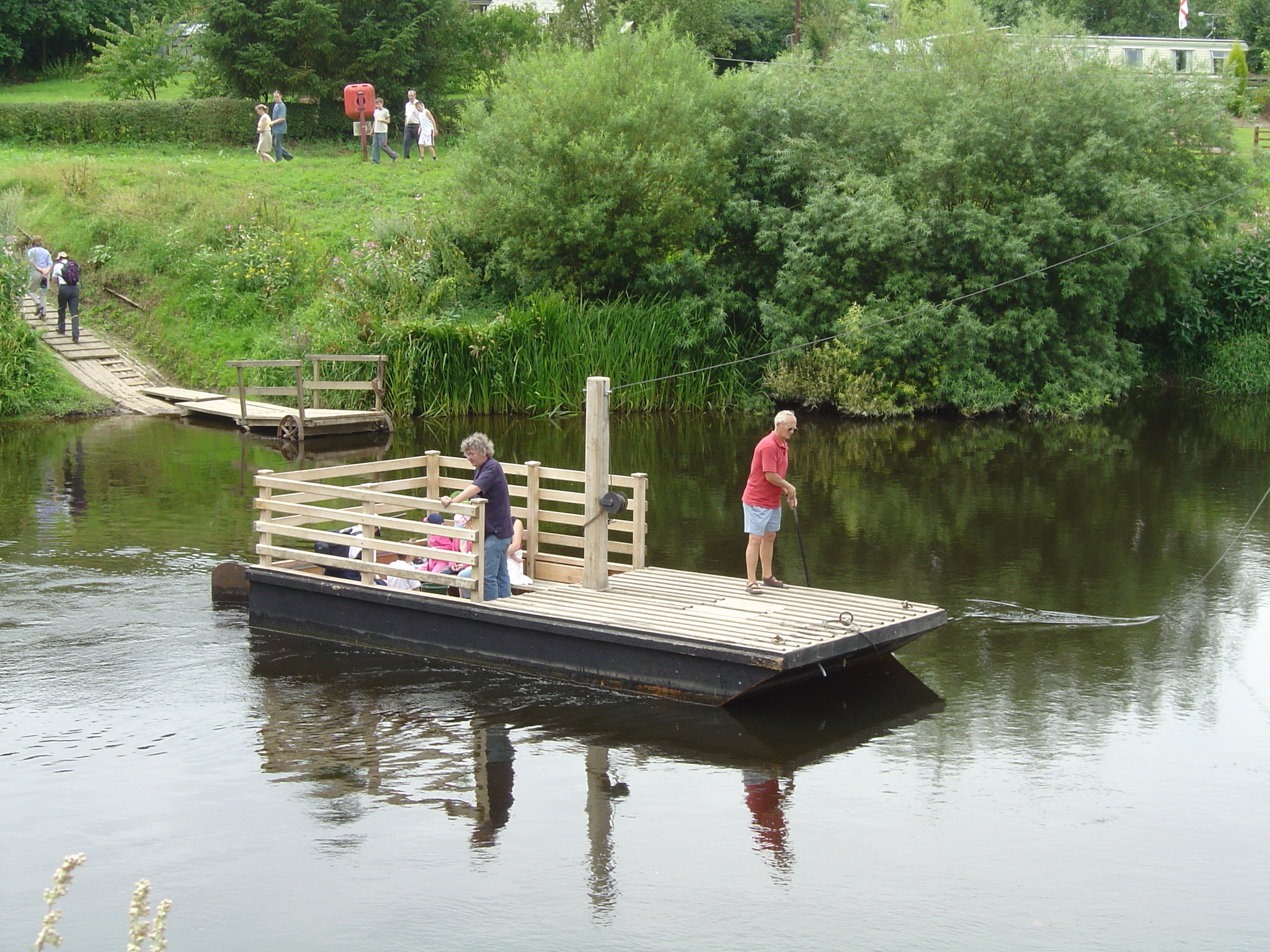
Hampton Loade Ferry

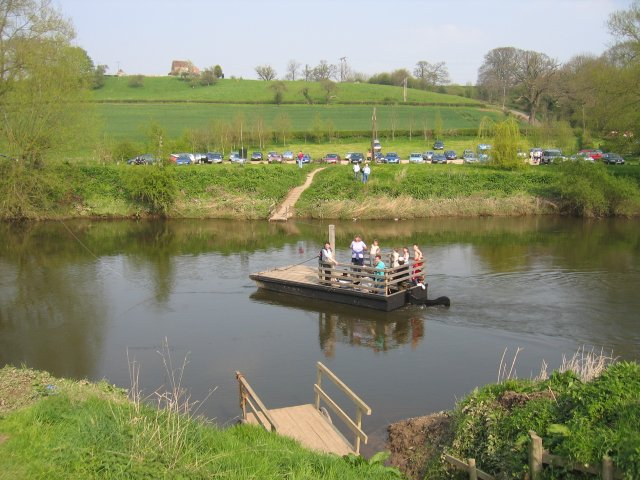
The pulley and suspended cable can just be seen to the left of the picture

Hampton Loade Ferry was a pedestrian cable ferry linking the villages of Hampton Loade and Hampton across the River Severn in the English county of Shropshire and providing a link to Hampton Loade village from Hampton Loade station on the heritage Severn Valley Railway, in Hampton village.

The crossing had been in use for around 400 years, and may have provided a route across the Severn during the Middle Ages.

During flooding on Sunday 13 December 1964 at 3.25 PM the ferry sank drowning the operator and caused inconvenience for the hamlet residents who had to take detours. The service was restored the following year.

In 2004 a new ferry was built by the nearby Ironbridge Gorge Museum to the design of the previous boat, which had seen 38 years' service. The new craft was of wooden construction, measures 20 feet by 9 feet, and carried up to 12 passengers.

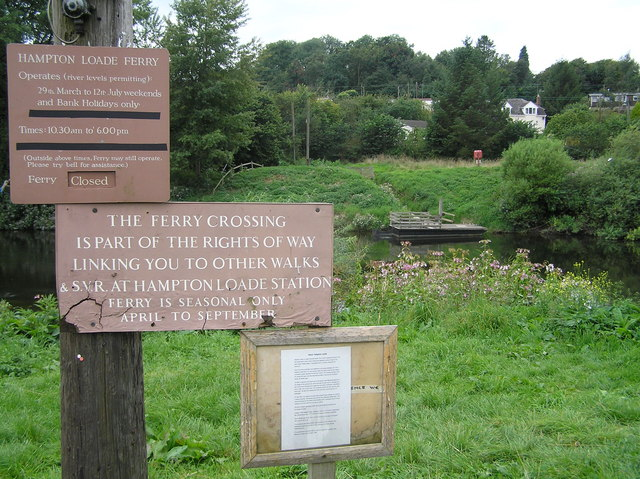
Hampton Loade Ferry information for passengers

The ferry was affected by the floods of 2007, which damaged the river banks and access roads and also affected the Severn Valley Railway, with a consequent loss of tourist revenue to the ferry. As a result, the ferry did not operate during the remainder of 2007 or during 2008, and the owner put it up for sale. Local people created the Hampton Loade Community Trust, a charitable trust, to reopen the ferry. This was achieved in April 2009.

The Hampton Loade Ferry was a reaction ferry, propelled by the river current. An overhead cable is suspended across the river, and the ferry was tethered by a second cable, to a pulley block that ran on the suspended cable. To operate the ferry it was angled into the current, causing the current to move it across the river.

The ferry has not been run since 2016 and now lies in a state of disrepair half submerged in the river. According to the Severn Valley Railway, which operates Hampton Loade station (actually on the Hampton side), the ferry has ceased operation.

== See also ==
- Crossings of the River Severn
