= Linley Halt railway station =

Former railway station in Shropshire, England

Linley Halt
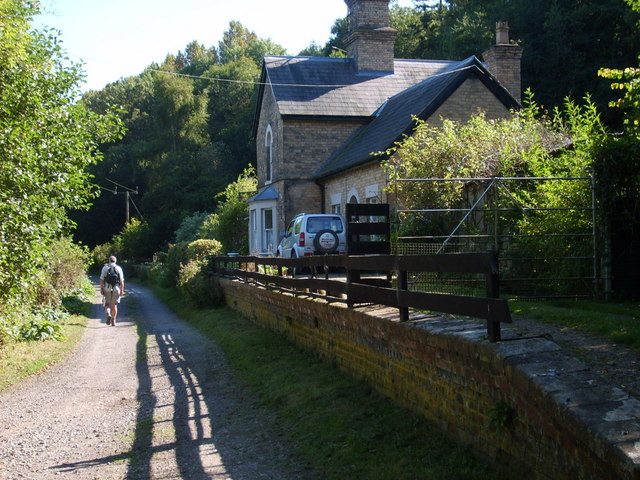
- Linley Halt, in 2007

General information
- Location: Astley Abbotts, Shropshire; England
- Coordinates: 52.5817°N 2.4371°W
- Grid reference: SO705983
- Platforms: 1

Other information
- Status: Disused

History
- Original company: Severn Valley Railway
- Pre-grouping: Great Western Railway
- Post-grouping: Great Western Railway

Key dates
- 1 February 1862: Station opened as Linley
- 1 January 1917: Temporarily closed
- 2 April 1917: Reopened
- 10 September 1951: Renamed Linley Halt
- 9 September 1963: Closed
Location

Linley, later Linley Halt, was a small railway station on the Severn Valley line in Shropshire, England.

The station was built as a condition of constructing the railway at the behest of Thomas C. Whitmore of Apley Park estate, through which the railway runs. Apley Hall lies on the opposite bank of the River Severn to the station. Access from the estate to the station was originally by ferry and later via a chain suspension bridge.

The single siding accessed by means of a ground frame was taken out of use in December 1957. The siding connected with the running line with a trailing connection in the up direction. The station closed on 9 September 1963 as part of the planned closure of the northern end of the Severn Valley Line which pre-dated the Beeching report.

The little altered station building survives as a private residence although the canopy that provided shelter to passengers on the platform has been removed. The building is to the same design as Hampton Loade, on the preserved Severn Valley Railway.

| Preceding station | Disused railways | Following station |
|---|---|---|
| Coalport West; Line and station closed | Great Western Railway; Severn Valley Railway | Bridgnorth; Line closed, station open |
