= Hampton Loade =

Hamlet in Shropshire, England

Coordinates: 52.474°N 2.373°W

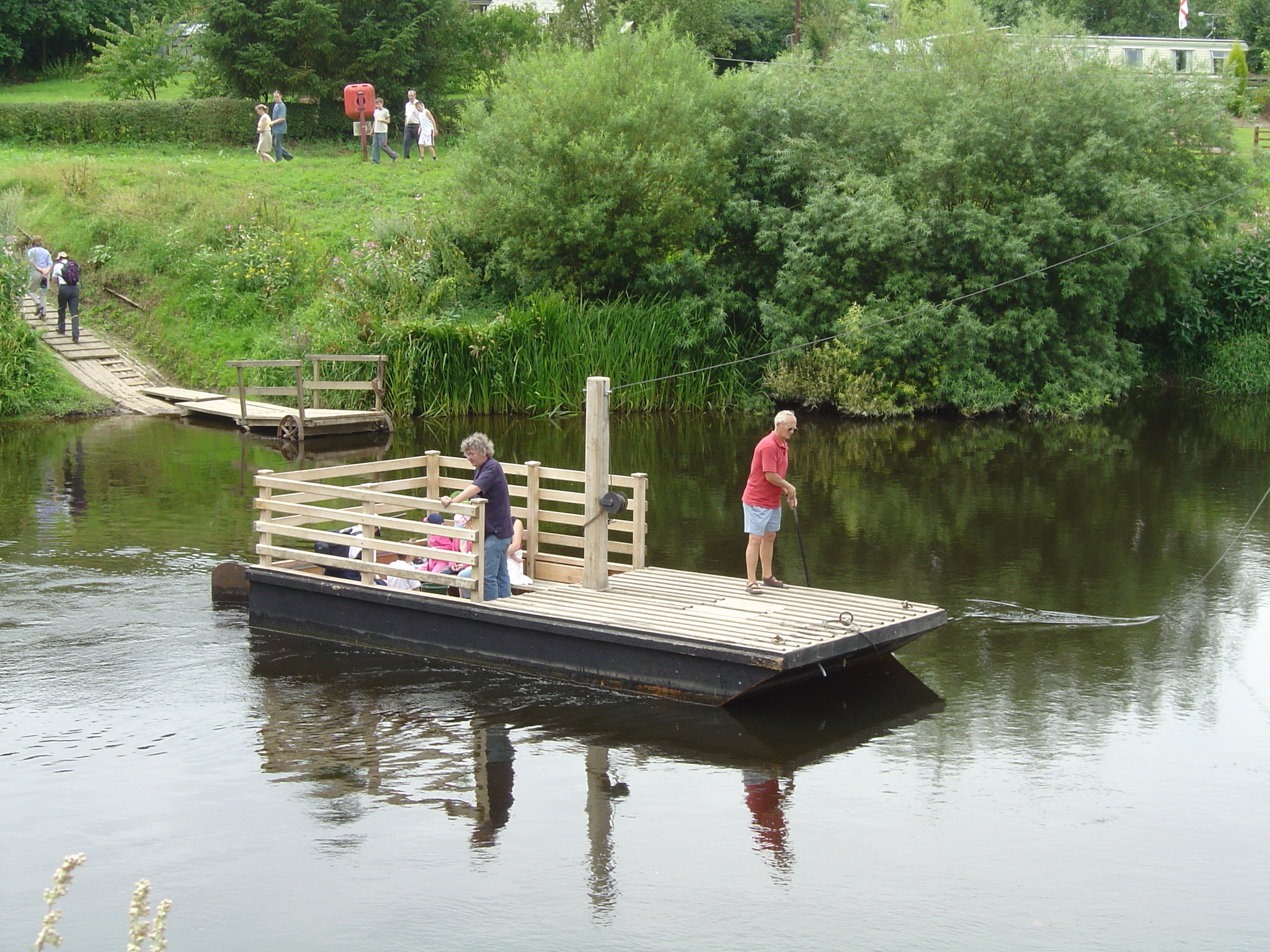
- Hampton Loade reaction ferry, 24 July 2004

- Location within Shropshire
- OS grid reference: SO747864
- Civil parish: Quatt Malvern
- Unitary authority: Shropshire
- Ceremonial county: Shropshire
- Region: West Midlands
- Country: England
- Sovereign state: United Kingdom
- Post town: BRIDGNORTH
- Postcode district: WV15
- Dialling code: 01746
- Police: West Mercia
- Fire: Shropshire
- Ambulance: West Midlands
- UK Parliament: South Shropshire

Hampton Loade is a hamlet in Shropshire, England along the Severn Valley. It is situated on the east bank of the River Severn at grid reference SO747864, some five miles south of Bridgnorth.

The unusual current-operated Hampton Loade Ferry, a reaction ferry to the hamlet of Hampton on the west bank, is responsible for Hampton Loade's name, as Loade is derived from lode, an old English word for ferry. However, the ferry has not been run since 2016, prompting speculation that it is permanently closed. This has not been confirmed by any reliable news sources, but according to the Severn Valley Railway it has ceased operation.

The hamlet is notable for the forge that stood there from 1608 to 1922. There are remnants of the forge still standing beside the river and in the houses. "Old Forge House" is where the owner of the forge lived and it is stated that there were over 6 owners of the forge in the 306 years of its use. "Old Forge Cottage" is where it is thought the workers lived.

Hampton Loade station, on the preserved Severn Valley Railway, is actually located on the Hampton side of the river although the whole area is often known locally Hampton Loade due to the presence of the station.

== Waterworks bridge ==
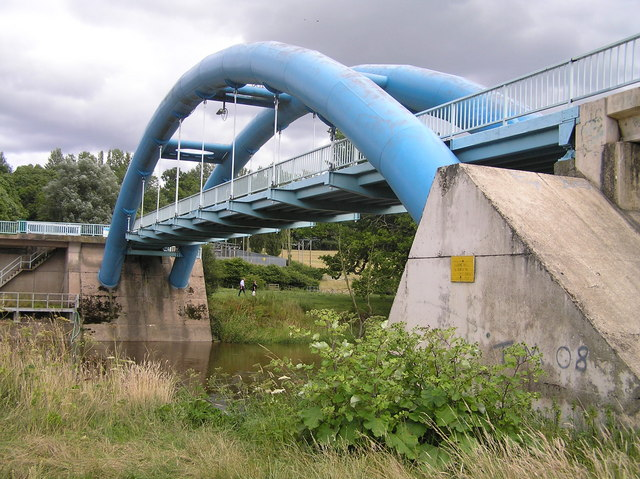
Unusual waterworks bridge at Hampton Loade

There is an unusual bridge close to Hampton Loade: a small private roadway belonging to South Staffordshire Water is suspended below two large water pipe arches, used to pump water from the river to Chelmarsh Reservoir, by the South Staffordshire Water works.

== Sat-nav error ==
The hamlet is also home to a satellite navigation error where the ferry is listed as a car ferry or a bridge on certain sat-nav systems; there are now road signs in place warning of the error on the approach to the hamlet.

== Landslide of June 2007 ==
On the night of 19 June 2007, the village of Hampton on the west bank suffered major damage as a result of a severe rainstorm. The one and only road into the village was washed away (BBC photo), and large sections of nearby Severn Valley Railway track subsided.
