= Chelmarsh Reservoir =

Coordinates: 52.485334°N 2.393113°W

Chelmarsh
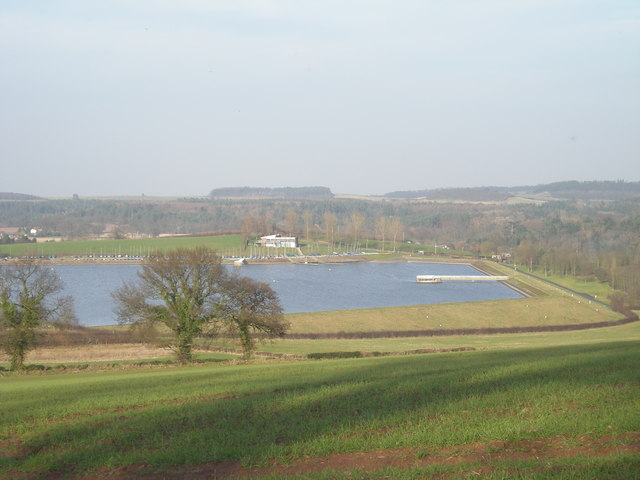
- Interactive map of Chelmarsh
- Country: England
- Location: Shropshire
- Construction began: 1963
- Opening date: 1966
- Construction cost: £680,000
- Owner: South Staffordshire Water

Dam and spillways
- Type of dam: Embankment dam
- Impounds: Chelmarsh Brook
- Height: 27 m (89 ft)
- Length: 700 m (2,300 ft)
- Elevation at crest: 70.1m
- Spillway capacity: 18m^{3}

Reservoir
- Total capacity: 3,063,000m^{3}
- Catchment area: 1km^{2}
- Surface area: 0.39km^{2}
- Normal elevation: 68.9m

Power Station
- Hydraulic head: 28m

Chelmarsh Reservoir is a water supply reservoir located in the village of Chelmarsh, Shropshire. The reservoir is operated by South Staffordshire Water and was created in 1963 to augment the supply of water in a large area of South Staffordshire and the Black Country. The main source of water to the reservoir is from abstraction from the River Severn.

The reservoir is the main source of supply for Sedgley beacon service reservoir that feeds potable water to some parts of Wolverhampton. Chelmarsh Reservoir attracts many species of wild birds.

== Hydrology ==
The site chosen for the reservoir was the valley of Chelmarsh Brook on the west bank of the Severn, about ¾ mile from Hampton Loade Ferry. Previously the site had been the location of a small dam which created Park Pond and served as an ornamental lake for Chelmarsh Hall.

== Recreational ==
The reservoir is home to a sailing club (www.chelmarshsailing.org.uk) whose refurbished facilities were opened by the Princess Anne in 2004. Chelmarsh Sailing club encourages people of all ages to learn to sail, it has an expanding fleet of modern sailing boats which are suitable for people of all ages and abilities. It has arguably the best sailing facilities within 50 miles range.
