= Alveley Halt railway station =

Former railway station in Shropshire, England

Alveley Halt
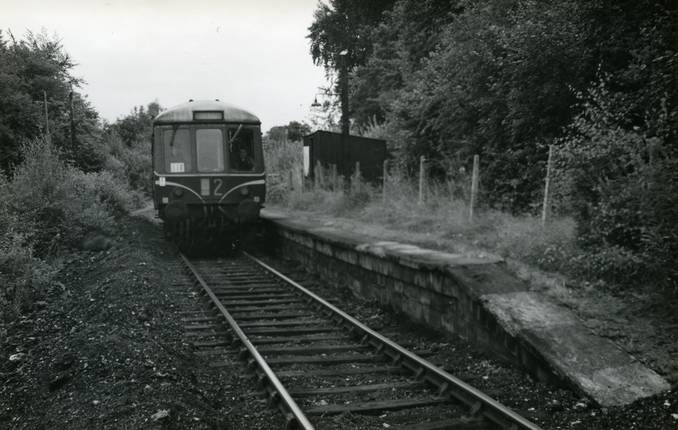
- The halt in 1963

General information
- Location: Highley, Shropshire; England
- Coordinates: 52°27′09″N 2°22′24″W
- Grid reference: SO746839
- Platforms: 1

Other information
- Status: Disused

History
- Original company: Great Western Railway
- Post-grouping: Great Western Railway

Key dates
- 1944: Station opens as Alveley Colliery Sidings
- Unknown Date: Station renamed Alveley Colliery Halt
- by June 1954: Station renamed Alveley Halt
- 9 September 1963: Station closes
Location

Alveley Halt was a halt on the original Severn Valley Line, situated between the villages of Highley and Alveley, in the English county of Shropshire. The station, which was not re-opened by the heritage Severn Valley Railway, has been replaced by the adjacent Country Park Halt around one-quarter of a mile (0.4 km) up the line.

== History ==
Mining at the Alveley Colliery began in 1938, and the halt opened around 1944 for the workers at the Colliery.

Ownership of the halt passed from the Great Western Railway to the Western Region of British Railways during the nationalisation of 1948. The Severn Valley Railway between Shrewsbury and Bewdley was closed to passenger and through goods traffic by the British Transport Commission in 1963. However, the southern section of track from the Colliery, which included the halt, remained open for coal traffic until the Colliery closed in January 1969.

== The site today ==
In summer 1973, the halt was demolished as the platform-face was collapsing towards the track. At the time, preparations were underway for the 1974 re-opening of the line by the Severn Valley Railway between Hampton Loade and Bewdley. Today, the former halt is a grass-covered piece of raised rough-ground, situated on the western side of the line adjacent to a level crossing. A section of GWR bridge rail, presumably a former signpost, still stands upright on the site.

The line passing through the halt is still active, and heritage trains from the Severn Valley Railway travel up it between Hampton Loade and Highley stations.

Preceding station	Historical railways	Following station
Hampton Loade; Line and station open	West Midland Railway (Severn Valley Line); Great Western Railway	Highley; Line and station open
