= Rifle Range Halt railway station =

Former railway station in England

Rifle Range Halt

General information
- Location: Kidderminster, Worcestershire; England
- Coordinates: 52.3690°N 2.2880°W
- Grid reference: SO804745
- Platforms: 1

Other information
- Status: Disused

History
- Opened: June 1905
- Closed: 4 October 1920
- Pre-grouping: Great Western Railway
Location

Rifle Range Halt was a short-lived unstaffed request stop on the GWR Kidderminster to Bewdley loop line which now forms part of the Severn Valley Railway. It was west of Bewdley tunnel near the “Devil’s Spittleful”, the sandstone outcrop on the nature reserve now managed by the Worcestershire Wildlife Trust.

== History ==
Rifle Range Halt opened in June 1905. The halt was mainly served by a steam railmotor service which was introduced on the Kidderminster - Bewdley - Stourport section of the railway in the same year. The nearby rifle range was used mainly during the First World War by volunteers from the Yeomanry.

The railmotors operated until 1918, and the halt was closed on 4 October 1920. No remains are now visible.

== See also ==
- Severn Valley Railway

Preceding station	Disused railways	Following station
Bewdley; Line and station open	Great Western Railway; Severn Valley Railway	Foley Park Halt; Line open, station closed
