= Fiona Cumming =

Scottish television director (1937–2015)

- Born: Fiona Margaret Cumming; 9 October 1937; Edinburgh, Scotland
- Died: January 1, 2015 (aged 77); Garlieston, Wigtownshire, Scotland
- Occupations: Television director, actress
- Known for: Female director of Doctor Who

Fiona Cumming (9 October 1937 – 1 January 2015) was a Scottish television director, noted for her work on the BBC television series Doctor Who during the show's Fifth Doctor era.

Her credits included the 1982 serial, Castrovalva, the Season 19 premiere, which marked the debut of Peter Davison as the show's fifth Doctor. Her other work with the show included Snakedance in January 1983 and Enlightenment in March 1983 for season 20. Cumming shot much of the 1984 serial, Planet of Fire, on location in Lanzarote, Canary Islands.

== Early life ==
Cumming was raised in Glasgow and Edinburgh, Scotland. She began her career as an actress at the Royal Scottish Academy of Music and Drama (RSAMD). There, she first met her husband-to-be Ian Fraser but it would be a number of years before they became a couple.

== Career ==
After training, Cumming appeared on stage, primarily at the Citizens Theatre in Glasgow, as well as appearing on radio and television. Her early roles included an episode of the BBC television series, Dr. Finlay's Casebook in 1963. She also worked as an announcer on Border Television (present-day ITV Border).

She transitioned from acting to television production in 1964. She had initially applied to the BBC and taught school in Scotland before breaking into production. She recalled her entry into the industry in a 2014 interview, telling Scotland Now, "I had applied to the BBC in 1964 when they were getting ready for BBC2, and I had been accepted - but they lost my file and because I had a teaching degree, I came back up to Glasgow and started teaching at Bellahouston Academy. I can remember in 1963 when the kids came in, talking about this brilliant TV show they had seen the Saturday night before, and I said, 'What do you mean, it's set in a police box?'...Then in 1964 I went to the BBC as a relief assistant floor manager, where you were slotted into various programmes. I was doing the twice-weekly soaps Compact and Swizzlewick, and the first time I was moved on to something different it was Doctor Who."

In 1965, she was hired as an assistant floor manager on the set of The Massacre of St Bartholomew's Eve. "I was put onto The Massacre in 1965 - so it's now 48 years since I first worked on Doctor Who. Peter Purves was William Hartnell's assistant at that time and the director was Paddy Russell, who had such a great reputation," she recalled in 2014. Cumming later worked as a production assistant for several episodes of Doctor Who during the 1960s and 1970s, including The Highlanders, The Seeds of Death, and The Mutants.

In 1974, Cumming was hired as a staff television director for the BBC. She directed episodes for some of the BBC's leading dramatic series during the 1970s, including Angels, Play for Today, Z-Cars, and The Omega Factor, a short-lived series which aired in 1979. In 1980, Cumming directed two episodes of Blake's 7 during the show's third season, Sarcophagus and Rumours of Death. She also contributed in that year to directing the three-film children's TV series God's Wonderful Railway.

Cumming was booked to direct The Ultimate Evil during Doctor Who's 23rd season in 1986, but the production was cancelled when the show was put on hiatus. While she did not direct additional episodes on Doctor Who, she maintained a working relationship with the show's producer, John Nathan-Turner, and collaborated with him at Teynham Productions, a company focussing mainly on pantomime productions.

In 1988, Cumming made a cameo appearance as a tourist at Windsor Castle in Silver Nemesis for Doctor Who's 25th season. She also oversaw the re-edit of her 1983 serial, Enlightenment, for its re-release as part of the Black Guardian Trilogy DVD box set in 2009 as well as the re-edit of her 1984 serial, Planet of Fire for its re-release as part of the Kamelion Tales DVD box set in 2010.

== Personal life ==
Cumming and Fraser were reunited years later while working on The Omega Factor, where he was working as a production assistant. On 15 August 1980, they were married at Martha Street Registry Office. The couple moved to Denmark in the mid-1990s, where they spent five years teaching directing at a film college.

Returning to the UK, Cumming successfully battled cancer. By 2009, the disease was in remission, enabling her to enjoy her retirement for another five years, until her health deteriorated quickly in late 2014. A resident in Dumfries and Galloway, Cumming died on New Year's Day 2015, at the age of 77.
