= Foley Park Halt railway station =

Former railway station in England

Foley Park Halt

General information
- Location: Kidderminster, Worcestershire; England
- Coordinates: 52.3721°N 2.2604°W
- Grid reference: SO823749
- Platforms: 1

Other information
- Status: Disused

History
- Pre-grouping: Great Western Railway
- Post-grouping: Great Western Railway

Key dates
- January 1905: Opened
- 1925: resited to opposite of the line
- 1970: Closed
Location

Foley Park Halt was the first stop on the GWR Kidderminster to Bewdley loop line which now forms part of the Severn Valley Railway. It was located in the Kidderminster suburb of Foley Park where the railway went under the A451 Stourport Road. Facilities included a single wooden platform, a ticket booth and a Pagoda Platform Shelter.

== History ==
Foley Park Halt opened in January 1905 and was originally situated to the south of the line. In 1925 the halt was relocated to the north side of the line to accommodate sidings for the British Sugar factory at Foley Park.

The halt closed in 1970 when public services between Bewdley and Kidderminster ended. When SVR services started operating in 1984, the halt was not reopened.

== See also ==
- Kidderminster Town railway station
- Severn Valley Railway

== Sources ==
- http://www.miac.org.uk/sugar.htm
- http://www.miac.org.uk/foleypark.htm

Preceding station	Disused railways	Following station
Rifle Range Halt; Line open, station closed	Great Western Railway; Severn Valley Railway	Kidderminster; Line and station open
