= Country Park Halt railway station =

Railway station in Shropshire, England

Coordinates: 52.45497°N 2.37586°W

Country Park Halt is an unstaffed request stop on the Severn Valley Railway heritage line in Shropshire, situated near the west bank of the River Severn, about 300 yards north of the footbridge between Highley and Alveley in the Severn Valley.

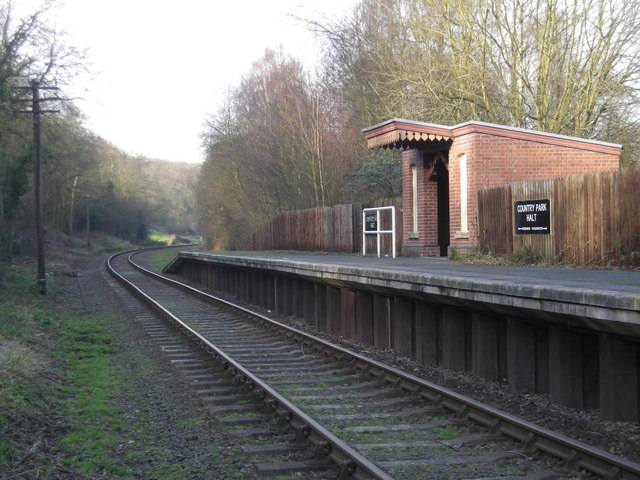
Country Park Halt

The halt was opened on 4 April 1996 as part of an initiative by Bridgnorth district council (who paid for it) to serve the Severn Valley Country Park. It now features a red-brick shelter. The halt has replaced Alveley Halt (situated half a kilometre to the south), which was closed in 1963 and not reopened by the SVR. The halt is built on what was formerly the site of the "Alveley sidings", where coal from Alveley Colliery was loaded onto freight trains.

The halt, like much of the Country Park, is on National Cycle Route 45 and has a purpose-built low-incline cycle path from the nearby bridge (which also forms part of the cycle route). The cycle path is also convenient for wheelchair access. The cycle route and associated footpaths lead through the numerous glades, picnic areas and nature reserves of the Country Park. The nearest public toilets are located about a kilometre away, on the east side of the river (Alveley), uphill at the Country Park Visitors' Centre, which also hosts a café at peak periods.

There is no highway access to Country Park Halt, and trains stop there only on request during hours of daylight. Passengers wishing to board should hold up their hand (any polite hand signal will do, although the traditional one is an open palm held aloft). Passengers wishing to alight should alert the driver or guard when boarding the train. The train driver will be aware that the stop is by request only, and will slow down through the halt looking for passengers.

Preceding station	Heritage railways	Following station
Hampton Loade towards Bridgnorth	Severn Valley Railway	Highley towards Kidderminster Town
