= Coalport West railway station =

Former railway station in Shropshire, England

Coalport
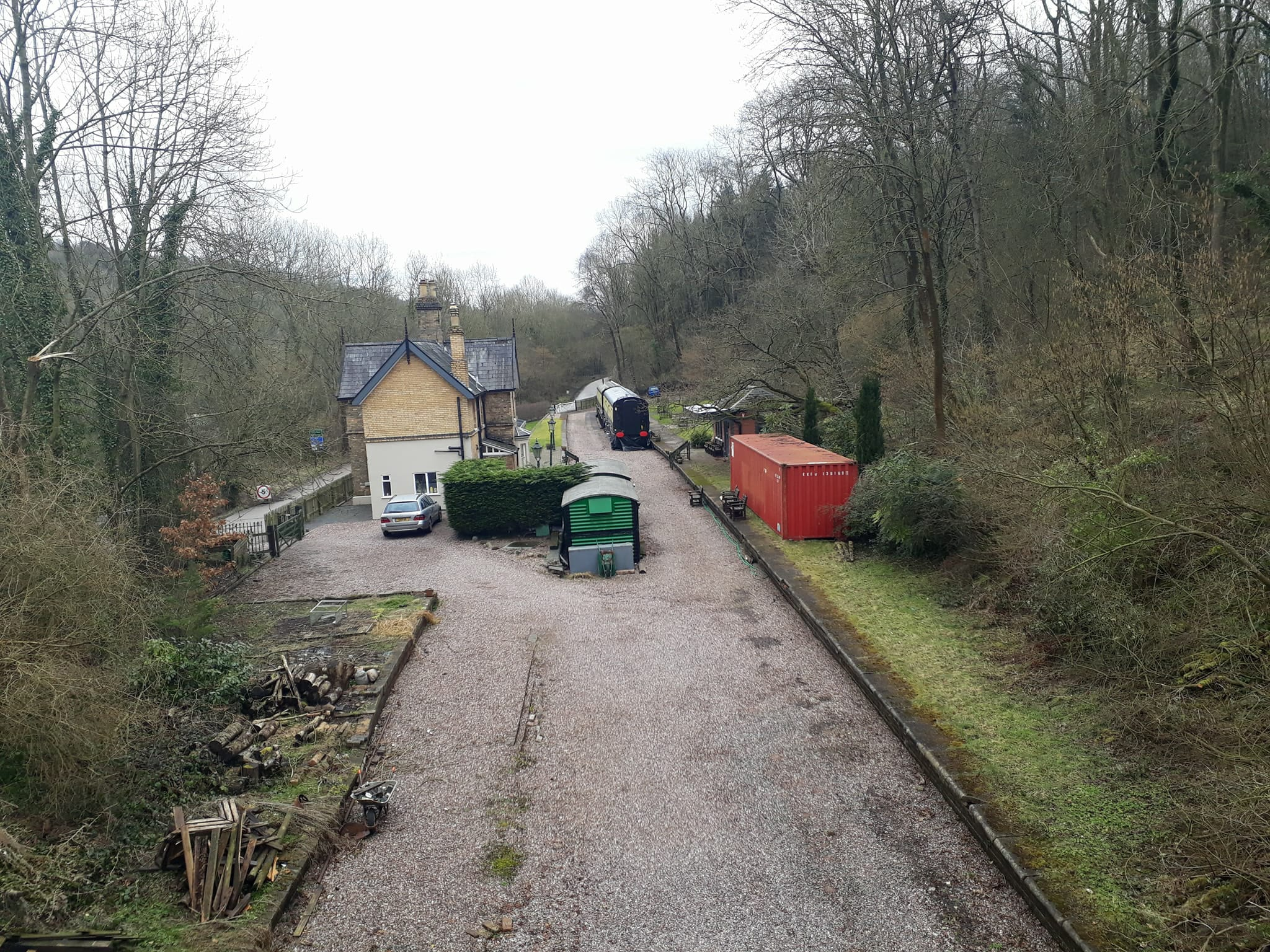
- Coalport station site in 2018

General information
- Location: Coalport, Shropshire; England
- Coordinates: 52.6150198°N 2.4430602°W
- Grid reference: SJ701019
- Platforms: 3

Other information
- Status: Disused

History
- Original company: Severn Valley Railway
- Pre-grouping: Great Western Railway
- Post-grouping: Great Western Railway

Key dates
- 1 February 1862: Opened
- 9 September 1963: Closed
Location

The GWR Coalport railway station, active 1862–1963, was originally built as a single through platform railway station on the Severn Valley Line serving the village of Coalport in Shropshire, England. By January 1896 an additional platform had been added, thus permitting up and down trains to pass along, with a third platform face behind the up platform to form an east-facing bay. By this time, the goods sidings to the east of the station had been expanded.

"The Directory of Railway Stations" refers to the GWR station being renamed "Coalport West" by British Railways. However use of the name "Coalport" continued in Engineer's Line References, BR Working Timetables, and on the platform running in boards. The 1963 BR notice of closure of the line also referred to the station only as Coalport.

The station closed on 9 September 1963 as part of the planned closure of the northern end of the Severn Valley Line which pre-dated the Beeching report.

== Present day ==
The station lies on a dismantled section of the Severn Valley Line north of Bridgnorth and has been sold into private hands as a dwelling. The building is very similar in style to Arley on the Severn Valley Railway and retains many of its original architectural features having been extended in a sympathetic manner. Although the bay platform has been filled in, the platform edging bricks remain. The space between the two main platform faces has been only partially filled and the station thus retains much of its former character.

Two converted British Railways Mark 1 carriages (W25778 and W26014) stand on a short length of track between the platforms and are used as holiday accommodation. In 2026, the body of Bournemouth Corporation Tramways car no. 13 was moved to the site for restoration.

A length of the railway formation which runs parallel to the platforms continues to Bridgnorth and is now part of the National Cycle Network 45, running from Salisbury, Wiltshire to Chester, Cheshire .

The former site of the LNWR Coalport East railway station lies almost directly on the opposite side of the River Severn.

In June 2017, the station was offered for sale, at an asking price of £950,000.

| Preceding station | Disused railways | Following station |
|---|---|---|
| Jackfield Halt; Line and station closed | Great Western Railway; Severn Valley Railway | Linley Halt; Line and station closed |
