= Severn Valley Railway =

Heritage railway in England

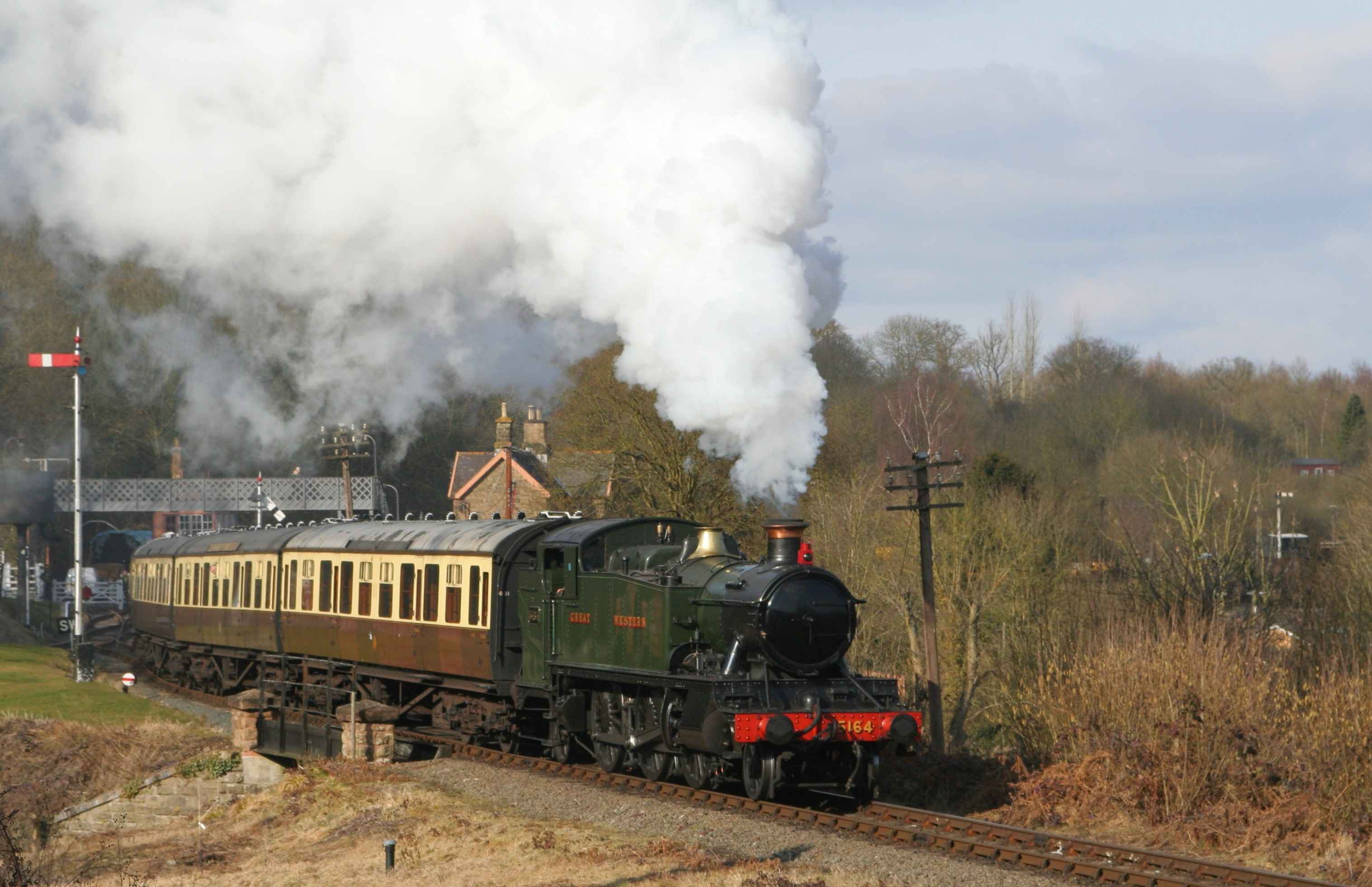
- GWR 5101 Class large prairie 5164 leaving Highley railway station on the SVR, 2010
- Locale: Worcestershire and Shropshire
- Terminus: Kidderminster, Bridgnorth

Commercial operations
- Name: Severn Valley Line
- Built by: Severn Valley Railway
- Original gauge: 4 ft 8 1/2 in (1,435 mm) standard gauge

Preserved operations
- Operated by: Severn Valley Railway Society Limited
- Stations: 9 (including 3 "halts")
- Length: 16 miles (26 km)
- Preserved gauge: 4 ft 8 1/2 in (1,435 mm) standard gauge

Commercial history
- Opened: 1 February 1862
- Closed: 5 January 1970 (Bewdley Station)

Preservation history
- 1965: Severn Valley Railway Preservation Society formed
- 1970: Severn Valley Railway granted light railway order
- 1970: Bridgnorth – Hampton Loade reopened
- 1974: Hampton Loade – Bewdley reopened
- 30 July 1984: Bewdley – Kidderminster reopened
- Headquarters: Kidderminster

Website
- svr.co.uk

The Severn Valley Railway (SVR) is a standard-gauge heritage railway in Shropshire and Worcestershire, England. The 16-mile (26 km) single-track line runs from Bridgnorth to Kidderminster, calling at four intermediate stations and three request stops ("halts"), following the course of the River Severn along the Severn Valley for much of its route, and crossing the river on the historic Victoria Bridge. Train services are hauled by a mixture of steam and heritage diesel locomotives and are often composed of restored heritage carriages, though goods trains are run on special occasions. The railway operates most weekends and holidays throughout its running season, it also holds events featuring more intensive operation, such as steam and diesel galas.

== History ==
=== Commercial history ===
Severn Valley Railway Act 1853
- Act of Parliament
- Parliament of the United Kingdom
- Long title: An Act for making a Railway from the Oxford, Worcester, and Wolverhampton Railway near Hartlebury in the County of Worcester to the Borough of Shrewsbury in the County of Salop, with a Branch, to be called "The Severn Valley Railway;" and for other Purposes.
- Citation: 16 & 17 Vict. c. ccxxvii

Dates
- Royal assent: 20 August 1853
Other legislation
Repealed by	Severn Valley Railway Act 1855

Status: Repealed

Text of statute as originally enacted

Severn Valley Railway Act 1855
- Act of Parliament
- Parliament of the United Kingdom
- Long title: An Act for the making and maintaining of the Severn Valley Railway; and for other Purposes.
- Citation: 18 & 19 Vict. c. clxxxiii

Dates
- Royal assent: 30 July 1855
Other legislation
Repeals/revokes	Severn Valley Railway Act 1853

Text of statute as originally enacted

Severn Valley Railway Act 1856
- Act of Parliament
- Parliament of the United Kingdom
- Long title: An Act for authorizing Deviations from the authorized Line of the Severn Valley Railway, and for making further Provision with respect to Shares in the Capital of the Severn Valley Railway Company, and for facilitating the Completion of their Undertaking, and for other Purposes.
- Citation: 19 & 20 Vict. c. cxi

Dates
- Royal assent: 21 July 1856

Text of statute as originally enacted

Severn Valley Railway Act 1858
- Act of Parliament
- Parliament of the United Kingdom
- Long title: An Act for making further Provision with respect to the Severn Valley Railway, in order to the Completion thereof; and for other Purposes.
- Citation: 21 & 22 Vict. c. cxxxv

Dates
- Royal assent: 23 July 1858

Severn Valley Railway (Leasing) Act 1860
- Act of Parliament
- Parliament of the United Kingdom
- Long title: An Act to enable the Oxford, Worcester, and Wolverhampton Railway Company to take on Lease the Undertaking of the Severn Valley Railway Company.
- Citation: 23 & 24 Vict. c. lxxvi

Dates
- Royal assent: 14 June 1860

Text of statute as originally enacted

West Midland and Severn Valley Railways Act 1862
- Act of Parliament
- Parliament of the United Kingdom
- Long title: An Act to authorize an Alteration of the Terms of the Lease of the Severn Valley Railway to the West Midland Railway Company; and for other Purposes.
- Citation: 25 & 26 Vict. c. clxxxiii

Dates
- Royal assent: 29 July 1862

Text of statute as originally enacted

Severn Valley Railway Act 1864
- Act of Parliament
- Parliament of the United Kingdom
- Long title: An Act to authorize the Severn Valley Railway Company to raise further Sums of Money, and to make certain Works in connexion with their Railway; and for other Purposes.
- Citation: 27 & 28 Vict. c. cli

Dates
- Royal assent: 30 June 1864

Text of statute as originally enacted

The Severn Valley Railway was built between 1858 and 1862, and linked Hartlebury, near Droitwich Spa, with Shrewsbury, a distance of 40 miles (64 km). Important stations on the line were Stourport-on-Severn, Bewdley, and Arley within Worcestershire; and Highley, Hampton Loade, Bridgnorth, Coalport, Ironbridge and Broseley, Buildwas, Cressage, and Berrington in Shropshire.

Although the railway was built by the original Severn Valley Railway Company, it was operated from opening on 1 February 1862 by the West Midland Railway which was later absorbed into the Great Western Railway (GWR) on 1 August 1863. As one of the many branch lines on the GWR's extensive network, it was subsequently referred to in GWR timetables as the Severn Valley Branch. Most infrastructure on the line (excluding embankments and cuttings) was constructed to a double-track width, but only a single-track was laid to save on costs, this was to allow a future expansion to double track to occur with minimal disruption to services on the line, however, this would never occur.

In 1878, the GWR opened a link line between Bewdley and Kidderminster. This meant trains could run direct from the Black Country to areas of Shropshire. This link line is now part of the preserved route, with the original line of the Severn Valley Railway, through Stourport, having been dismantled from beyond the original junction near Bewdley, to Hartlebury, where it met the OWW. Most Kidderminster to Bewdley trains continued over the Tenbury and Bewdley railway (dismantled in the 1960s) to Tenbury Wells or Woofferton. At Buildwas Junction (now the site of the former Ironbridge Power Station near what is now Telford) Severn Valley trains connected with services from Wellington to Much Wenlock and Craven Arms.

For much of its working life, the Severn Valley line was operated by the Great Western Railway and subsequently the Western Region of British Railways. Today, the Severn Valley Railway operates almost exclusively as a heritage passenger railway.

==== Decline and closure ====
Prior to preservation, the Severn Valley line was never financially successful. Freight traffic, mostly agricultural, and coal traffic from the collieries of Alveley and Highley were the principal sources of revenue. Passenger numbers began to fall after the First World War, particularly at the large intermediate stations of Stourport, Bewdley, and Bridgnorth, with measures such as the opening of halts in the 1930s to attract more local custom having only limited impact. However, the line was strategically useful in the Second World War as an alternative diversionary route around the West Midlands, the primary route being the Oxford, Worcester and Wolverhampton Railway.

After nationalisation in 1948, passenger traffic continued to dwindle. Although the Severn Valley Branch was closed during the Beeching cuts of the 1960s, it was already scheduled for closure prior to the publication of Beeching's report, 'The Reshaping of British Railways', on 27 March 1963. British Railways had announced in January 1962 that the Severn Valley Branch was under review, and the British Transport Commission published closure proposal notices on 1 October 1962 in advance of a meeting of the West Midlands Transport Users Consultative Committee, which took place at Bridgnorth Town Hall on 8 November 1962. Objections to the proposed closure were unsuccessful and the line between Shrewsbury and Bewdley was closed to passenger services on 9 September 1963, and to through freight services on 30 November 1963. Following closure, the track north of Bridgnorth was dismantled. After 1963, the line from Bewdley was retained to serve Alveley Colliery until 1969, while a sparse passenger service continued to link Bewdley with Kidderminster and Hartlebury, until this too ceased in January 1970. Freight traffic between the British Sugar Corporation's Foley Park factory and Kidderminster continued until 1982.

=== Heritage railway ===
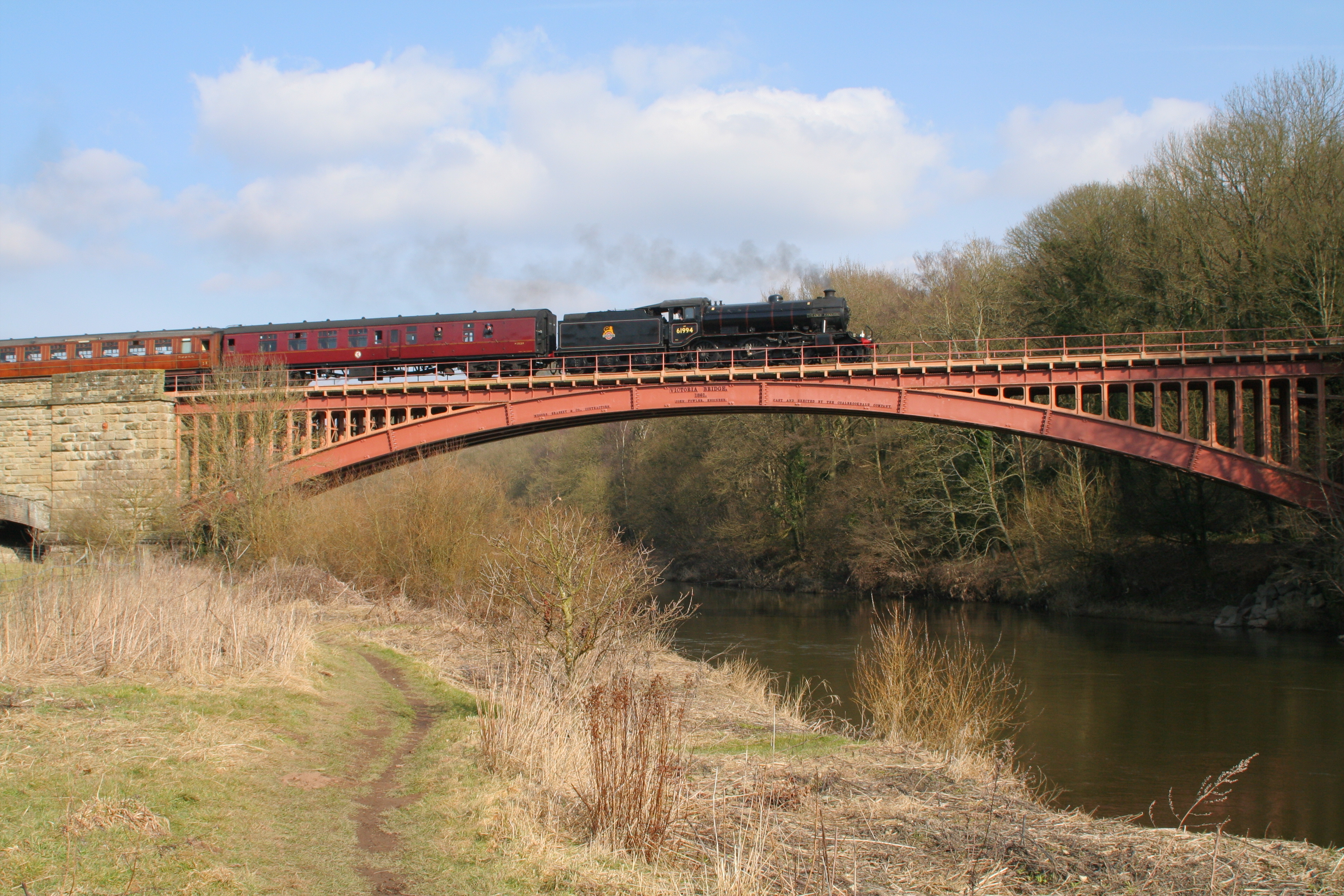
61994 The Great Marquess crossing Victoria Bridge.

British Railways Board (Severn Valley) Light Railway Order 1970
- Statutory Instrument
- Parliament of the United Kingdom
- Citation: SI 1970/7

Dates
- Made: 5 January 1970
- Commencement: 16 January 1970

British Railways Board (Severn Valley) Light Railway (Transfer) Order 1970
- Statutory Instrument
- Parliament of the United Kingdom
- Citation: SI 1970/778

Dates
- Made: 20 May 1970
- Commencement: 21 May 1970

British Railways Board (Severn Valley) Light Railway Order 1973
- Statutory Instrument
- Parliament of the United Kingdom
- Citation: SI 1973/357

Dates
- Made: 27 February 1973
- Commencement: 28 February 1973
Other legislation
Made under	Light Railways Act 1896; Light Railways Act 1912; Railways Act 1921

Text of statute as originally enacted

Severn Valley Light Railway (Transfer) Order 1974
- Statutory Instrument
- Parliament of the United Kingdom
- Citation: SI 1974/642

Dates
- Made: 28 March 1874
- Commencement: 29 March 1874
Other legislation
Made under	Light Railways Act 1896; Light Railways Act 1912; Railways Act 1921

Text of statute as originally enacted

British Railways Board (Severn Valley) Light Railway (Transfer) Order 1974
- Statutory Instrument
- Parliament of the United Kingdom
- Citation: SI 1974/643

Dates
- Made: 28 March 1874
- Commencement: 29 March 1874
Other legislation
Made under	Light Railways Act 1896; Light Railways Act 1912; Railways Act 1921

Text of statute as originally enacted

Severn Valley Light Railway Order 1984
- Statutory Instrument
- Parliament of the United Kingdom
- Citation: SI 1984/1202

Dates
- Made: 20 July 1984
- Commencement: 21 July 1984
Other legislation
Made under	Light Railways Act 1896; Transport Act 1968

Text of statute as originally enacted

The original Severn Valley Railway Society was formed in July 1965 by people who wished to preserve a section of the line which had closed in 1963. British Railways (BR), who owned the line and was beginning its demolition, agreed to an offer of £25,000 for the 5 1/2 miles of the line between Bridgnorth and Alveley Colliery in February 1966 and the society paid an initial deposit of £2,500 in February 1967. Obtaining a light railway order required a limited company to be formed, with a new Severn Valley Railway Company being incorporated in May 1967, named after the company that originally built the railway over which it now operates. Even at that early date, the objective of the company was to "preserve, retain and restore the standard-gauge railway extending from Bridgnorth to Kidderminster via Bewdley".

The British Railways Board (Severn Valley) Light Railway (Transfer) Order 1970 (SI 1970/778) was granted in May 1970, allowing regular services to begin between Bridgnorth and Hampton Loade; the balance of the £25,000 purchase price being paid to BR on 24 June 1970.

The end of coal trains from the colliery in 1969 allowed SVR to acquire a further 8 1/2 miles of the line from Hampton Loade to Foley Park in 1972, the purchase price of £74,000 (£876,000 in 2025 prices) being raised by the flotation of a public company initially under the chairmanship of Sir Gerald Nabarro MP (the line was partly in his former Kidderminster constituency). The share issue took place, but after SVR volunteers discovered he planned to sell the Bridgnorth railway station site for hotel and housing development and bring business friends from outside onto the board, it led to a threatened strike by the railway's volunteer staff and his proposals were thrown out at a heated AGM. Nabarro stood down as chairman in March 1973, being succeeded by Viscount Garnock, and resigned from the board of directors in May 1973. Services were extended to Bewdley in May 1974.

Following the end of freight traffic from the British Sugar factory at Foley Park in 1982, the SVR purchased the final section of the line to Kidderminster at a cost of £75,000 (£267,000 in 2025 prices). The SVR also rented the former Comberton Hill goods yard at Kidderminster from BR, on which a new station would be built. This was achieved in time for services to Kidderminster to begin on 30 July 1984.

Major developments on the SVR since 1984 have included the commissioning of a newly constructed signal box at Kidderminster in 1987, the opening of a new boiler shop at Bridgnorth in 1990, the purchase of the freehold of Kidderminster Town station in 1994, the opening of a new carriage shed at Kidderminster in 2003, the completion of the east wing and canopy of Kidderminster Station in 2006, and the opening of the Engine House Museum at Highley in 2008. 2010 marked the Severn Valley railway's 40th anniversary since opening in 1970 and the 175th anniversary of the formation of the Great Western Railway. 2015 marked the 50th anniversary since the birth of the Severn Valley Railway on 6 July 1965. Special events were staged during both years to mark these anniversaries.

On 1 June 2026 the public limited company Severn Valley Railway (Holdings) plc was converted into a Charitable Community Benefit Society, the Severn Valley Railway Society Limited (SVRS). In September 2026, an eight-week trial began of a twice-daily commuter service between Bewdley and Kidderminster Town, timed to allow passengers to connect with mainline services from Kidderminster to Birmingham Moor Street operated by West Midlands Railway, with through ticketing available.

== Preservation ==
=== Operations ===
The SVR usually operates heritage steam/diesel hauled passenger trains over the approximately 16-mile (26 km) line between Kidderminster and Bridgnorth, calling at all stations. The two "halts" in regular use (Northwood Halt and Country Park Halt) are request stops. Passengers may use these halts during daylight hours only. These services usually operate during British school holidays and weekends, and occasionally feature carriages offering dining experiences as an added attraction for visitors. The railway also hosts events as special attractions targeted towards different demographics to boost revenue and ridership.

Many special gala days are held for enthusiasts, often with visiting engines and rolling stock from other heritage lines; these and other attractions have seen visitor numbers increase to and exceed 250,000. As only short trains may stop at Eardington Halt, it is only used during such special events.

The SVR announced in September 2023 that it had signed a partnership agreement with Network Rail which will allow the railway to obtain professional skills, advice and redundant railway materials from the mainline to assist with operations, along with the hosting of Network Rail employees on special volunteer days.

==== External trains ====
The SVR's rail connection to Britain's mainline railway network at Kidderminster permits various track maintenance, weed killing, track measurement and occasional passenger-carrying trains to operate from various parts of the country to Bridgnorth. Some examples of these are:

- Two freight trains in May 2007, which carried 6-metre-long pipes from Kidderminster to the Severn Trent water handling plant at Trimpley, operated by EWS.
- Two direct trains to London Marylebone from Bridgnorth operated by Chiltern Railways in 2009, one on 15 August and one on 28 November.
- The railway acted as a testing ground for the first of the rebuilt Class 69 mainline locomotives in March 2021, operated by GB Railfreight.
- The CrossCountry HST40 railtour in September 2022.

=== Signalling ===
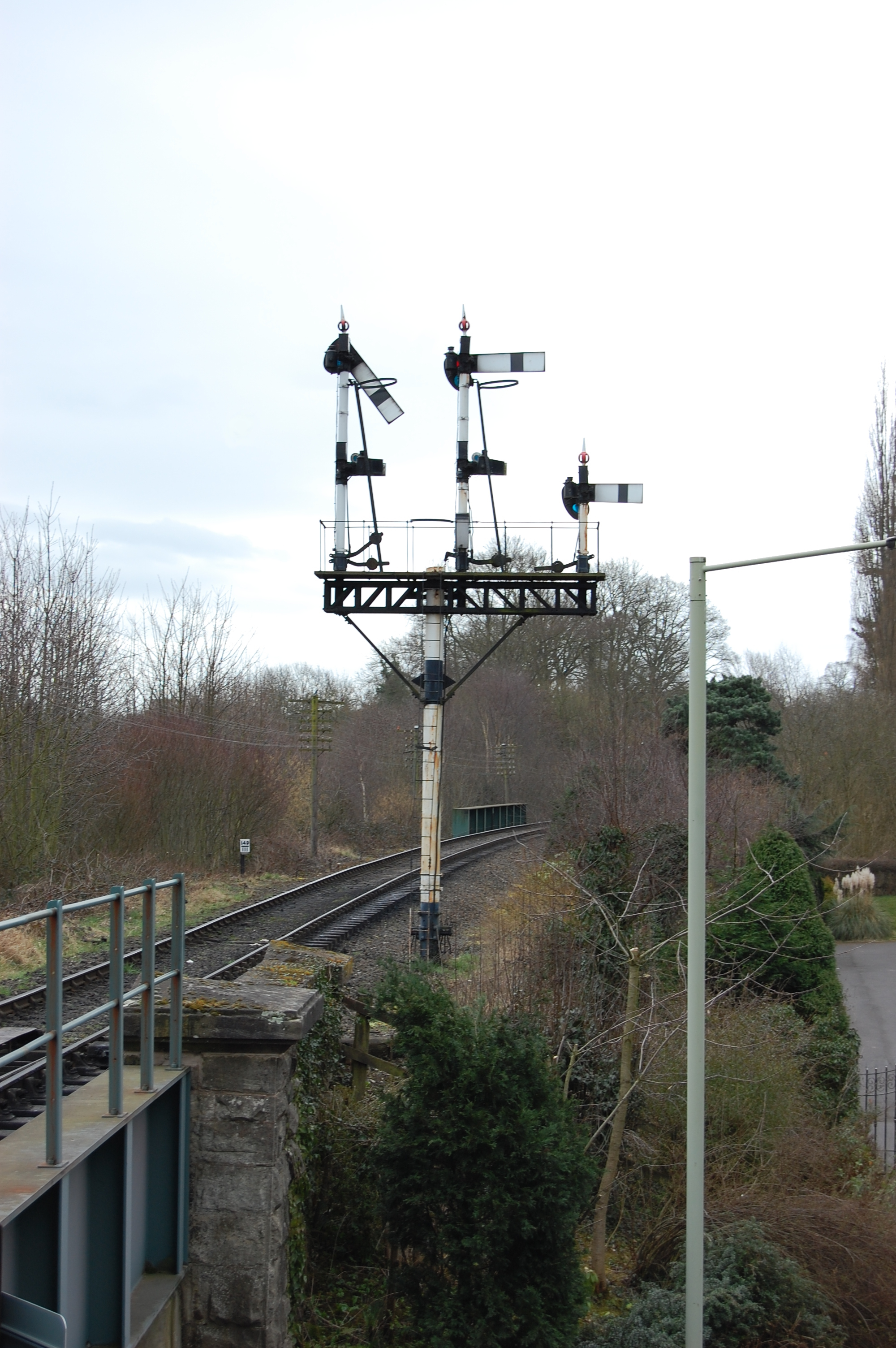
Down Home Signals for Bridgnorth, cleared for a train to enter Platform 1. These are all lower quadrant semaphores of GWR origin.

With the exception of the connection at Kidderminster to Network Rail metals (which uses a colour light signal) the whole railway is signalled using Great Western style lower quadrant signals, of both metal and wooden pole/arm types. (Exceptionally, the down starter at Highley has a rare concrete post). Each station (not including halts) has a signal box, with Bewdley having two boxes (North and South), due to the size of the layout there (Bewdley originally being a junction station).

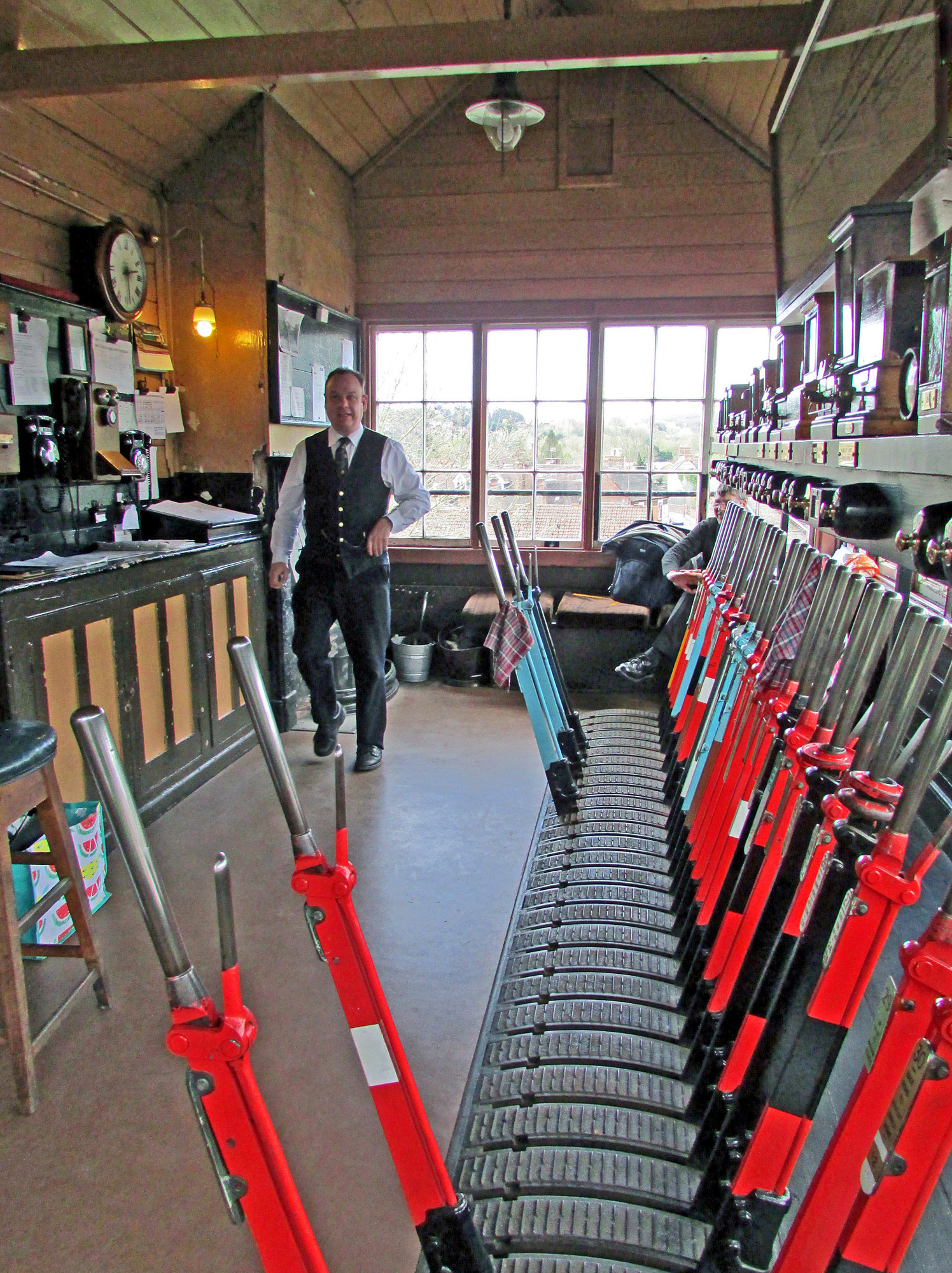
Bewdley North signal box.

All sections between Bridgnorth and Bewdley North operate using the Tyer's Electric Train Token. Both Arley and Hampton Loade signal boxes can be switched out when not required by the service, reducing wear on the mechanics and reducing the number of signalmen required to operate the line. Arley yard may be accessed with the signal box switched out due to the presence of an intermediate token instrument, which also enables a train to depart from or terminate in the yard when the box is switched out.

Bridgnorth also has a ground frame at the northern end of the layout allowing movements from the Hollybush siding (which also serves as the headshunt for locomotives running round their trains) into and out of the Boiler Shop. An Annett's key which unlocks the frame may be obtained by a member of staff when released by a lever in Bridgnorth box.

The Engineer's siding at Eardington is controlled by a ground frame. No intermediate token instrument is provided, with the Highley-Bridgnorth token directly unlocking the two lever frame. This means that Hampton Loade signal box must be switched out when Eardington siding has to be used, and also that a train cannot terminate or depart from there – unless the token is taken by road between Eardington and Highley or Bridgnorth signal box.

Between Bewdley North and Bewdley South the double track section through platforms 1 & 2 is signalled with absolute block. The single track through platform 3 is signalled with direction lever. The line furthest from the main station buildings, known as the Rock siding, is a double-ended siding. The single-track section between Bewdley South and Kidderminster is track circuited throughout and is signalled using acceptance lever.

Most of the signal boxes on the line bear original cast iron GWR name plates, with the sole exception being at Bridgnorth which has a replica. The SVR Kidderminster's name plate was recovered from another signal box that formerly stood on the up end of the down platform at Kidderminster station (Network Rail). The lever frame from the same signal box was reused at Arley, which has an LNWR signal box, originally from Yorton after the original was demolished. The replica name plate at Bridgnorth is made of fibre glass, although it is not known if it was moulded from the original or even if the original still exists.

=== Rolling stock and locomotives ===
The SVR preserves, maintains and restores a large number of heritage passenger carriages and goods wagons which it uses to operate its regular services. It can also call on a large fleet of locomotives to operate its services. Only a small 'core' group of vehicles actually belong to the railway company itself; the remainder are owned by an associated groups, such as the Great Western (Severn Valley Railway) Association, Erlestoke Manor Fund, and 75069 fund, or individuals. The SVR is also the base of the West Midland Group, which focuses on DMU preservation, and the Diesel Traction Group, which owns a number of the SVR's heritage diesel locomotives. Locomotives and vehicles from the railway are now only infrequently used on excursions on the National Rail network, when their signalling equipment and mainline certification (or lack thereof) permits.

=== Miniature railways ===
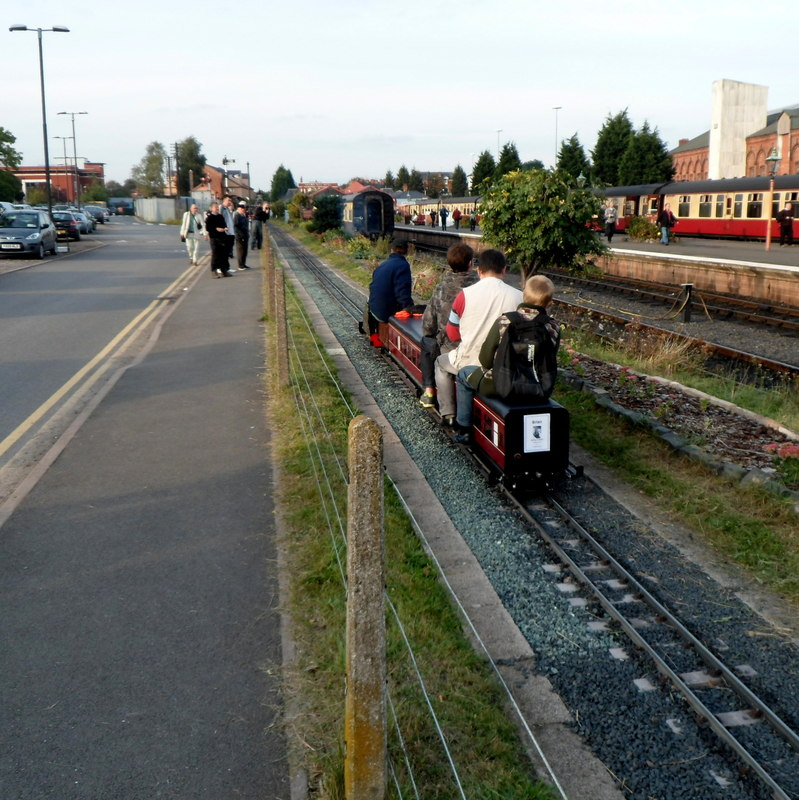
The Coalyard Miniature Railway at Kidderminster

The Coalyard Miniature Railway also operates passenger trips, and is based at Kidderminster Town station. The Paddock Railway is a 32 mm gauge (1:19 scale) model railway which operates most Sundays at Hampton Loade railway station. Both of these railways are operated by volunteers.

== Maintenance facilities ==
=== Locomotive works ===
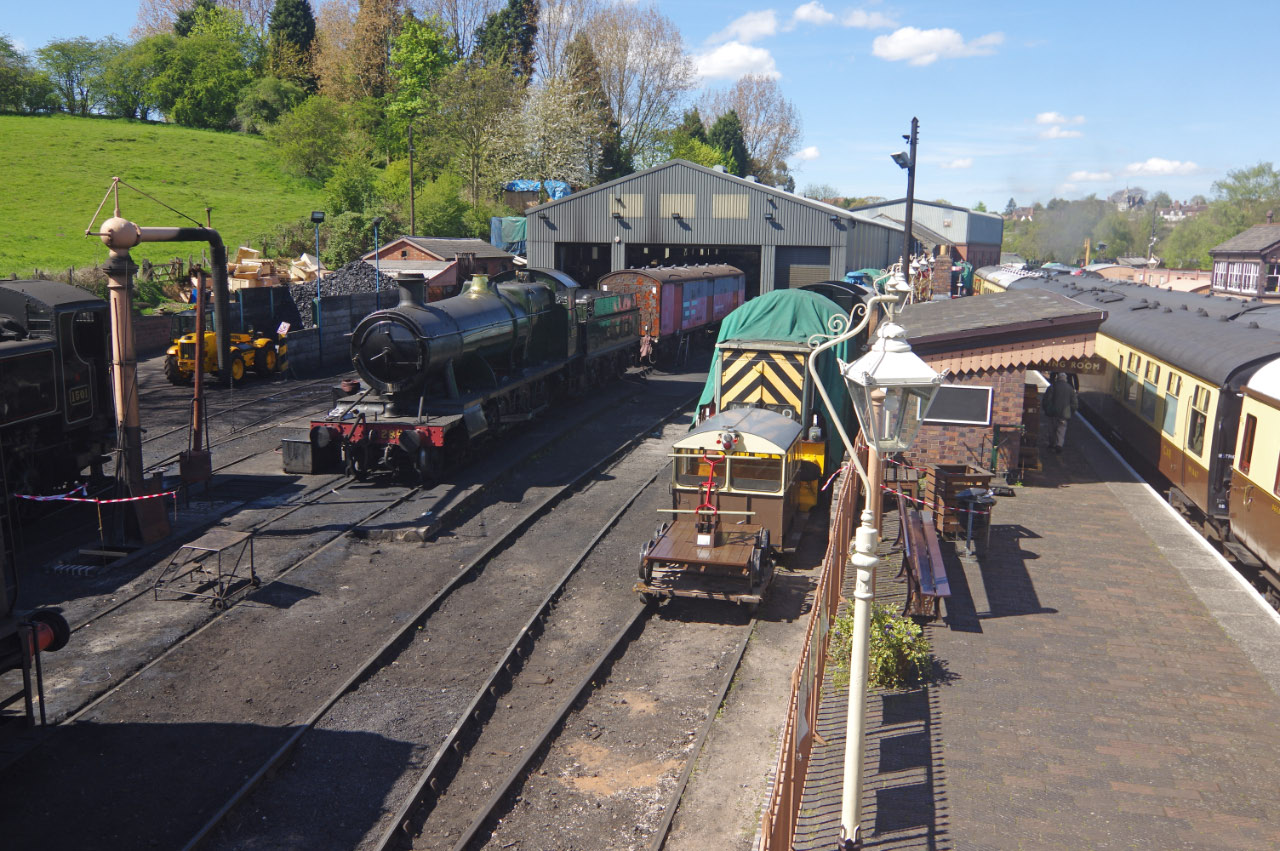
Bridgnorth locomotive works in 2015.

The main locomotive works are located at Bridgnorth. For health and safety reasons it is not normally open to the public, but guided tours and open days are arranged from time to time. The works facilities include lifting jacks, a Noble and Lund wheel lathe, a wheel drop recovered from Leicester MPD, and a boiler shop with overhead crane. Works to improve natural illumination, waterproof the shed more effectively, and fit the southern end with roller-shutter doors were completed in early 2009, and a further upgrade completed in 2022 included the installation of an overhead crane, replacement of the roof, and a number of environmental initiatives such as conversion to LED lighting.

=== Traction maintenance depot ===
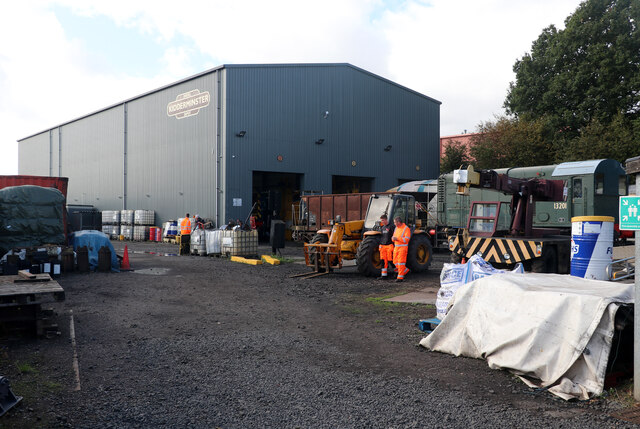
The Traction Maintenance Depot at Kidderminster.

Diesel locomotives are maintained in the traction maintenance depot at Kidderminster, which is also known as Kidderminster Diesel Depot. It is a three-road diesel depot building which was opened in 2016, with facilities including a pit and an overhead crane. It allows the SVR to maintain and manage their fleet of diesel locomotives.

=== Carriage works ===
Although carriage painting and restoration is carried out at a number of locations along the railway, the main carriage repair works is in the former goods shed at Kidderminster which lies adjacent to the main Birmingham to Worcester line. As well as having a machine shop and fabrication equipment to carry out a full range of body and bogie repairs, the carriage works is also able to calibrate and adjust dynamo voltage regulators and to thoroughly overhaul and test vacuum brake equipment. As with the locomotive works, for health and safety reasons it is not normally open to the public.

=== Carriage shed ===
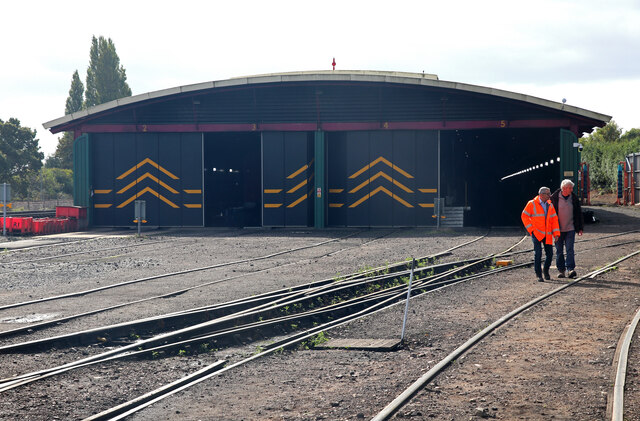
Kidderminster carriage shed in 2022.

Kidderminster carriage shed is a modern warehouse with a single-span grey roof adjacent to the running line out of Kidderminster. It is used to store, maintain, clean, inspect and perform smaller ad-hoc repairs to the SVR's fleet of passenger carriages. It has 6 sidings, two outside the main shed, and is almost 1/4 of a mile long. Its maximum capacity is 62 carriages, which is useful to the railway when it is not operating, as it mitigates weathering to the carriages and allows undercover storage for extended periods. It was constructed between 1999 and 2000 using £1.7m funding from the Heritage Lottery Fund.

=== The Engine House ===
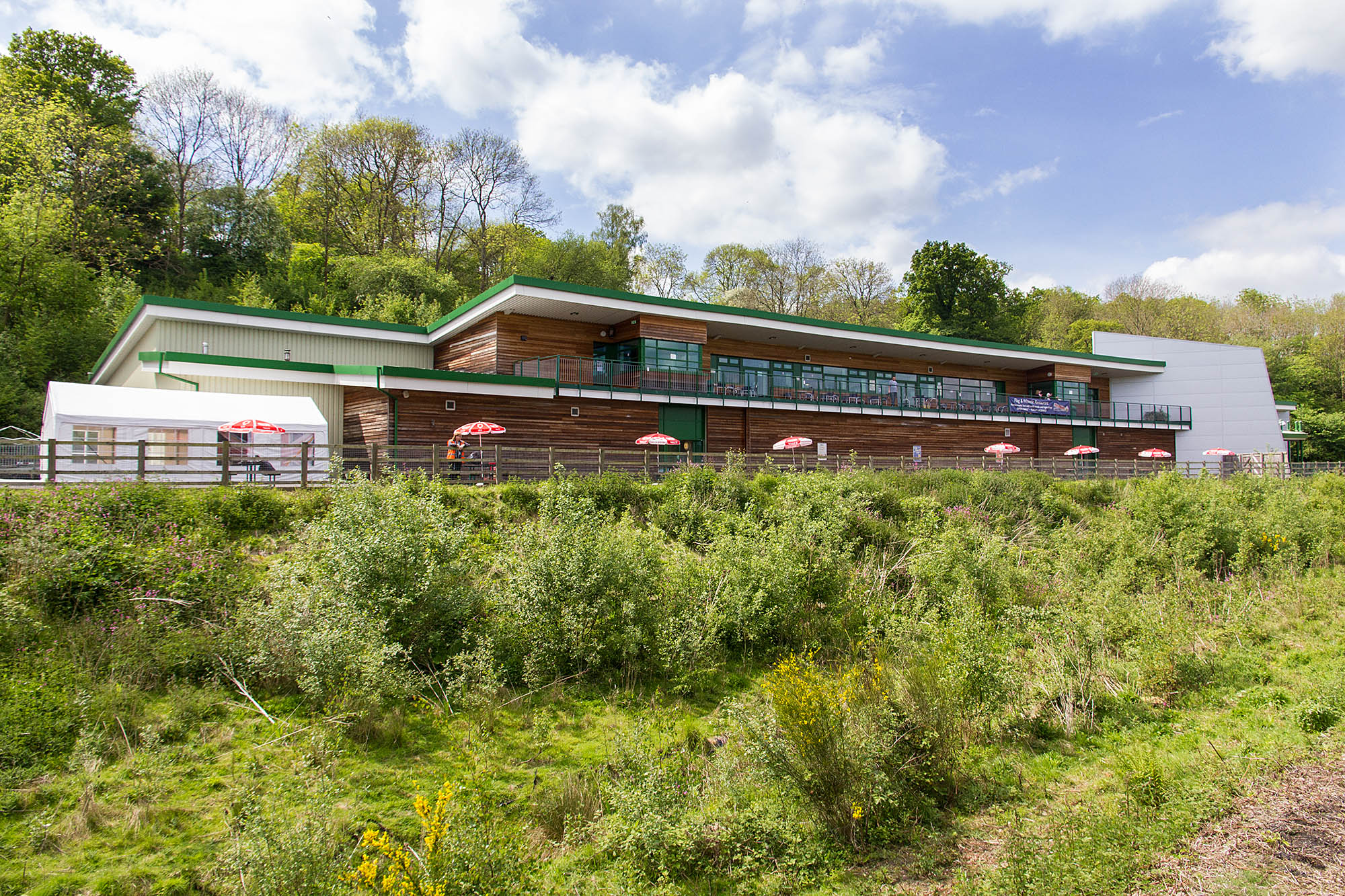
The Severn Valley Railway's Engine House at Highley, viewed from the running line parallel to it.

The Engine House, built on land adjacent to Highley station, provides covered accommodation and static display space for locomotives currently out of service, as well as space for displays of other rolling stock and an education/interpretation centre. It is normally open to the public when the railway is operating passenger trains, and serves as an attraction to the line.

==== Construction and opening ====
The land on which the Engine House stands was originally the sidings for Highley Colliery and was later used as the "Landsale Yard" for Alveley Colliery. The SVR had planned to use the area for a facility to store and display locomotives that did not hold current operational certificates as early as 1973. After the opportunity arose to obtain matching Heritage Lottery funding alongside grants from the European Regional Development Fund and Advantage West Midlands, the land was acquired by the SVR in August 2001. Planning permission for development was granted in 2004.

The planned opening in mid-2007 was delayed by the flood damage at Highley in June of that year (see § Major infrastructure damage—summer 2007). It eventually opened to the public on 20 March 2008, on the same day that full line services resumed between Bridgnorth and Kidderminster. An official opening was held on 28 April 2009, attended by the Lord Lieutenant of Shropshire, Algernon Heber-Percy. A second dedication, along with that of the newly constructed footbridge at Highley station, was performed on 21 October 2009 by Prince Richard, Duke of Gloucester, who had been unable to attend the first ceremony due to illness.

== Stations ==
=== Current stations ===
Point	Coordinates (Links to map resources)	OS Grid Ref	Notes
Bridgnorth	52.5305°N 2.4208°W	SO71559259	The only station building with any form of listing.
Eardington Halt	52.5017°N 2.4001°W	SO72938938	Originally just Eardington (closed in 1982 reopened in 2023).
Hampton Loade	52.4738°N 2.3771°W	SO74488627	
Country Park Halt	52.4549°N 2.3758°W	SO74558417	(Request stop) replaced Alveley Halt.
Highley	52.4448°N 2.3705°W	SO74918304	
Arley	52.4170°N 2.3480°W	SO76427994	
Northwood Halt	52.3941°N 2.3270°W	SO77847739	(Request stop).
Bewdley	52.3752°N 2.3061°W	SO79257528	
Kidderminster Town	52.3842°N 2.2400°W	SO83767626	Not an original station, opened in 1984.

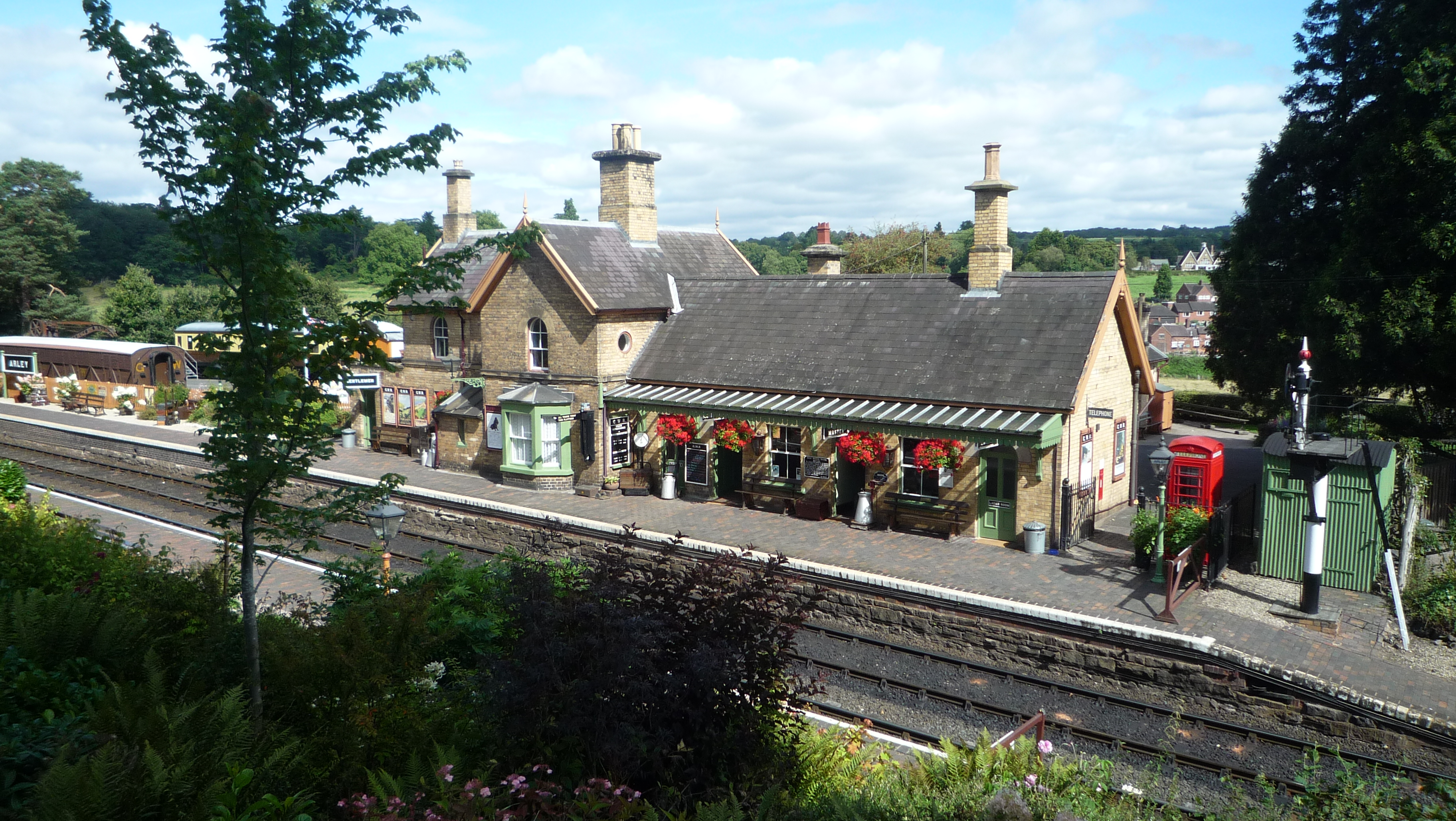
Arley railway station.

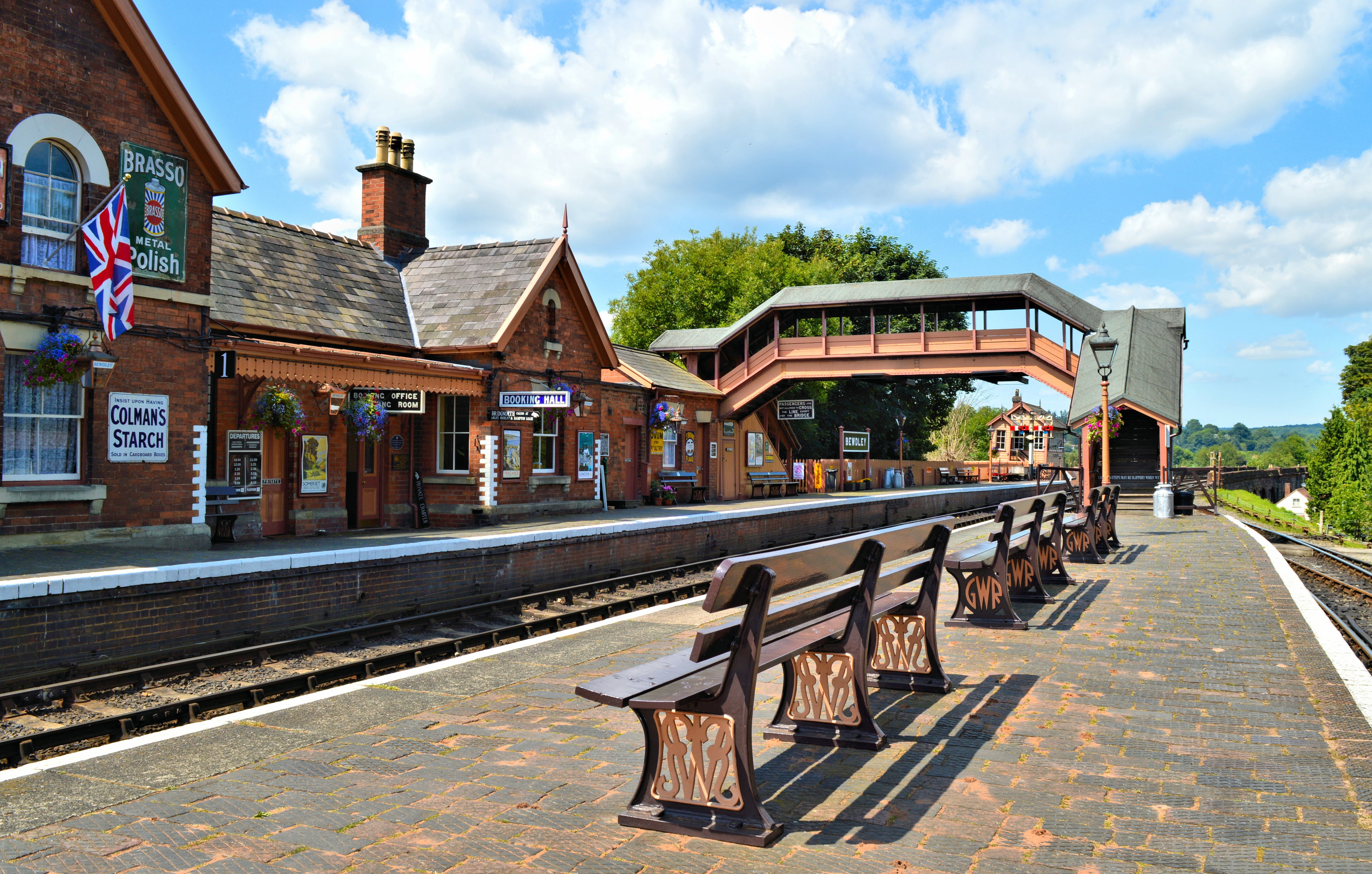
Bewdley railway station.

With the exception of the three request halts (Eardington, Country Park and Northwood), all intermediate stations allow trains to pass each other to continue on the single line. However, Highley's passing loop lacks a platform and facing point locks on points to attached sidings, a legal requirement for passenger-carrying line, meaning trains carrying fare-paying passengers may not pass using this loop. It is therefore used for works trains, demonstration goods trains and empty stock workings.

Kidderminster Town station is not an original station. It was built by the SVR, based upon the original GWR station at Ross-on-Wye (1892) and opened in 1984 on a site which used to be the Kidderminster goods yard. Various projects have since been carried out by volunteers and contractors to add to the station. Major projects include the porte cochère to the front of the station, the ornamental crestings on the two towers and the canopy over the concourse which was completed in 2006, along with the final, east, wing of the station.

Plans for a significant redevelopment of Bridgnorth station were approved by Shropshire Council in August 2016, this includes the addition of a new cafe, car park, locomotive turntable and volunteer accommodation, when funding is available.

=== Former stations ===
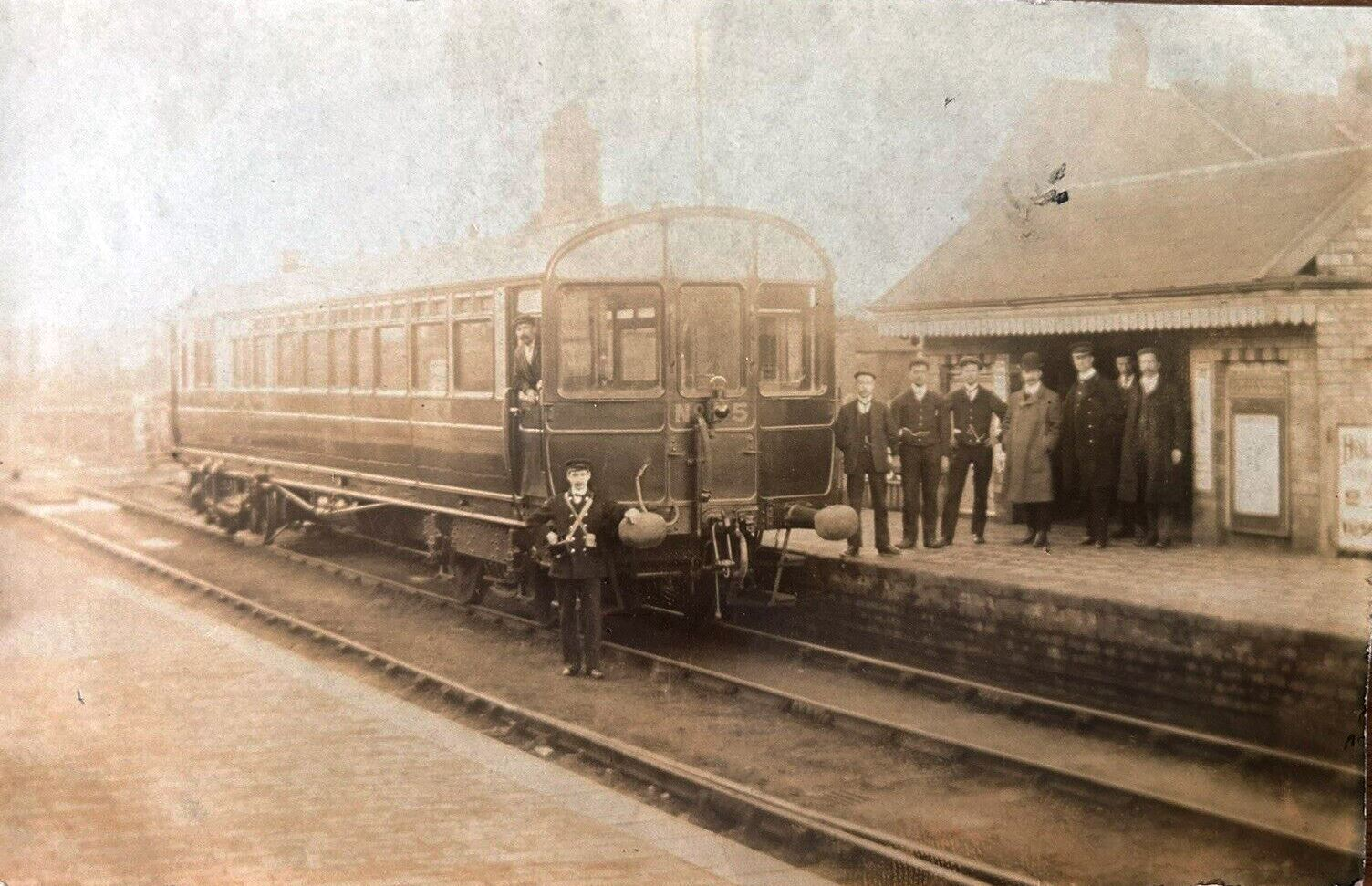
Stourport railway station in 1905.

A list of the former stations on the Severn Valley Railway, most of which were closed with the Severn Valley line in 1963, after 101 years in use, and never preserved by the current heritage railway due to a multitude of factors, including the lifting of track between Hartlebury and Bewdley and between Bridgnorth and Shrewsbury.

Between Hartlebury and Bewdley:

- Stourport-on-Severn (1862–1970)
- Burlish Halt, towards the north of Stourport at Burlish Crossing (1930–1970)

Between Kidderminster and Bridgnorth:

- Foley Park Halt (1905–1970)
- Rifle Range Halt (1905–1920)
- Alveley Halt (1944-1963)

North of Bridgnorth:

- Linley Halt (1862–1963)
- Coalport West (1862–1963)
- Jackfield Halt (1934–1954) & (1954–1963) Relocated due to land instability.
- Ironbridge and Broseley (1862–1963)
- Buildwas Junction (1862–1963)
- Cressage (1862–1963)
- Cound Halt (1934–1963)
- Berrington (1862–1963)

== Infrastructure damage ==
=== Major damage—summer 2007 ===
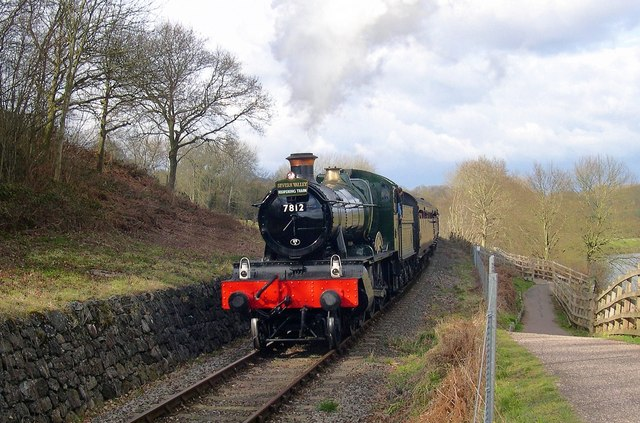
GWR Manor class 7812 Erlestoke Manor on the Severn Valley Railway on the re-opening date of 21 March 2008. The locomotive carries a headboard commemorating the re-opening which reads "Severn Valley reopening train".

On the evening of 19 June 2007, during violent thunderstorms that struck the area, the railway suffered major damage, more extensive than at any other time in its history. Between Bridgnorth and Northwood Halt, numerous landslides occurred, with several sections of the line around Fisherman's Crossing and Highley being left suspended in mid-air. A portion of track by Oldbury viaduct was also washed away. Many cuttings were filled with debris, while at Highley, the Up Starter signal and the embankment it used to stand on were washed away due to the torrent of water that had flowed down station road and on to the track. The chalets below the embankment were also washed away. At Hampton Loade, the access road to the railway station – and indeed the only road to the village – was also washed away.

It was announced on 22 June 2007 that an emergency appeal would be started within days to raise funds for the repair bill. The total cost of the damage was revised upwards as a result of further damage and a massive potential slip in the Northwood Lane area following more rain and flooding in late July. The final repair bill was put at approximately £3.7 million; this was funded by an initial grant from the European Regional Development Fund of £750,000, a grant from Advantage West Midlands of £500,000, £250,000 from the Heritage Lottery Fund, £1 million from the SVR's insurers (£500,000 for embankments, £350,000 for structures, signalling and track, and £150,000 specifically for Borle Viaduct), a further grant of £377,000 from the ERDF, £560,000 from the public appeal and the balance from SVR reserves. A dozen other heritage railways also pledged to help the stricken SVR, including Mid Hants Railway, Gloucestershire Warwickshire Railway, West Somerset Railway, Avon Valley Railway, Dean Forest Railway, Great Central Railway, North Yorkshire Moors Railway and Bluebell Railway.

These events damaged the summer tourist trade to the railway, the towns served, and the economy of the area as a whole. A noticeable impact to Bridgnorth's tourism was also felt. A spokesman announced on 22 June that the line was expected to reopen between Bewdley and Arley by the end of July and the section between Bridgnorth and Hampton Loade to be up and running by the end of August; however it became apparent in early July 2007 that these reopenings would be delayed by as much as a month, later extended by up to three months. On 19 July, another torrential storm caused further wreckage in at least 45 separate locations as rain fell on the already saturated ground, and in at least ten of these spots damage was so serious that major engineering work was required before reconstruction could get under way. It was also said later that the crucial link between Hampton Loade and Arley, including Highley station and the new Engine House museum, would probably not open until as late as Spring 2008.

The Bridgnorth to Hampton Loade section eventually re-opened on 9 February 2008 for the school half-term, although other drainage work enhancements remained to be completed, the line between Kidderminster and Bridgnorth reopened fully to the public on Good Friday 21 March 2008. The work increased to 144 the number of culverts under the line, where previously there were 44 before the floods.

=== 2025 landslip ===
On 30 January 2025, a landslip occurred between Hampton Loade and Bridgnorth stations, just north of Sterns. It occurred because the right wing wall of a small bridge which carried the railway over Mor Brook failed catastrophically, allowing the embankment upon which the railway sits to slide into the brook. This made the section of line unusable, and therefore cut Bridgnorth off from the rest of the line, causing numerous negative impacts to the railway, such as the full fleet of steam locomotives being stranded at the locomotive works next to the station, and resources such as their coal stockpile becoming inaccessible by rail.

By April 2025 the SVR had been in talks with insurers and contractors and had raised £125,000 towards the repairs. Repairs began in late May 2025, with contractors constructing a new retaining wall using more than 100 2.5-tonne concrete Legato blocks. The full line reopened on 26 July 2025 with the reopening train hauled by Flying Scotsman.

== Extensions to the railway ==
=== Northwards ===
Extending the preserved railway north from Bridgnorth was mooted by groups within the SVR as early as the mid-1970s, but the first plan was dismissed as impossible by the then Board of the SVR. For many years the SVR official website confirmed that 'the railway land north of Bridgnorth has been long since sold, and there is now no possibility of Severn Valley trains reaching Ironbridge and Shrewsbury ever again'. In 2002 the Board reported that third party enquiries into the possibility of EU funding to restore rail communication between Bridgnorth and Ironbridge had resulted in press reports that the SVR wished to extend to Ironbridge; the Board agreed that it would monitor developments and would welcome seeing the results of any feasibility study.

In January 2019, Campaign for Better Transport released a report identifying the line between Shrewsbury and Ironbridge which was listed as Priority 2 for reopening. Priority 2 is for those lines which require further development or a change in circumstances (such as housing developments).

In March 2021 an independent group, the Ironbridge Railway Trust (IRT), announced that they had made a bid to the government's 'Restoring Your Railway Ideas Fund' (RYR) to examine re-opening the line between Buildwas and Bridgnorth as a public railway, following the original route of the original Severn Valley branch wherever possible. The IRT application named both the Severn Valley Railway and Telford Steam Railway among the stakeholders, noting that the SVR had expressed an interest in understanding the outputs of the proposed RYR study although no discussions on operational engagement had been held, while the TSR had expressed caution about IRT's concept and proposed a Power Station-Ironbridge tram scheme, but was willing to work together going forward. The bid was considered in the third Ideas Fund round but was not one of the successful bids.

=== Westwards ===
There was a branch off the Severn Valley Railway near Bewdley to Tenbury Wells, the Tenbury and Bewdley railway. The former trackbed of this line is substantially intact as far as Newnham Bridge station before it is hemmed in by modern development. Several underbridges are missing, including the substantial Dowles Viaduct over the river Severn, a span over the Bewdley to Bridgnorth road and a brick span at Cleobury.

=== Eastwards ===
No extension eastwards towards Wolverhampton was ever built, although several schemes were proposed. These included:

Bridgnorth, Wolverhampton and Staffordshire Railway Act 1866
- Act of Parliament
- Parliament of the United Kingdom
- Long title: An Act for making Railways from Bridgnorth in Shropshire to Wolverhampton and other Districts in Staffordshire; and for other Purposes.
- Citation: 29 & 30 Vict. c. cxxix

Dates
- Royal assent: 28 June 1866

- An act of Parliament, the Bridgnorth, Wolverhampton and Staffordshire Railway Act 1866 (29 & 30 Vict. c. cxxix), for construction of the Bridgnorth, Wolverhampton and Staffordshire Railway which received royal assent in June 1866. Money could not be raised and the powers lapsed.
- The Wolverhampton and Bridgnorth Light Railway which was to be built under the terms of the Light Railways Act 1896 (59 & 60 Vict. c. 48). The route, which was planned by civil engineer WB Myers-Beswick, would have run from junctions with the GWR and LNWR at Priestfield to join the SVR south of Bridgnorth with a separate station in Bridgnorth Low Town. The path of the proposed railway bordered the lane between Sutton Mill and Sutton Farm, Dog Kennel and land owned by a Henry Cavendish Cavendish and Bridgnorth Rural District Council.
- The Great Western Railway (New Railways) Act 1905 (5 Edw. 7. c. xcviii) of 11 July 1905 which granted powers for construction of a line from near Oxley viaduct via Wombourne to join the Severn Valley Line at two junctions 1 mile and 1½ miles south of Bridgnorth. These powers were again granted in the Great Western Railway (Additional Powers) Act 1924 (14 & 15 Geo. 5. c. l) but although the Wombourne branch was completed in 1925, the connection to Bridgnorth was abandoned. There is thought to be some evidence of such a spur from the Severn Valley Line immediately south of Crossing Cottage near Eardington.

=== Southwards ===
The SVR owns the trackbed of the former Bewdley to Hartlebury section through Mount Pleasant Tunnel to a point 302 yards beyond its southern portal, approximately mid-way to the former location of Burlish Crossing. In late 2015 the railway announced that Rail Safety Solutions had taken a lease on the portion as far as Mount Pleasant Tunnel, which they used to provide training to Network Rail apprentices.

Between Burlish and Stourport station, the alignment of the former Bewdley to Hartlebury section has been redeveloped for housing. However, from the Hartlebury direction the trackbed is intact as a bridleway from Mitton (the eastern throat of the original station), with only a span over the A449 Worcester to Kidderminster main road missing. The abutments are intact. Almost all of the trackbed is in council ownership, and in 2007 they expressed an interest in reopening as a commuter line.

== In television and film ==
- The 1976 BBC television adaptation of Charles Dickens' short story "The Signal-Man" was filmed around the cutting on the Kidderminster side of the Bewdley Tunnel. A replica signal box was constructed in the cutting, while interior scenes were filmed in the actual signal box at Highley.
- Portions of The Seven-Per-Cent Solution (1976) were filmed on the railway.
- Scenes between Bewdley and Hampton Loade stations were filmed for the Walt Disney Productions film Candleshoe (screened 1977), starring David Niven and Jodie Foster, were shot in 1976. GWR No. 4566 was featured in the movie.
- The 1977 television film version of Silver Blaze used the railway.
- The 1978 film version of The Thirty Nine Steps was partly filmed on the railway—specifically, the scenes where Hannay (Robert Powell) hangs from Victoria Bridge. The scene is supposed to be set in Scotland.
- The BBC TV children's series God's Wonderful Railway (1980) was filmed on the SVR.
- Another BBC children's series The Box of Delights (1984) was filmed along the line; station scenes featured both Bewdley and Arley.
- Exterior shots for the 1990s BBC sitcom Oh, Doctor Beeching! were filmed at Arley station on the Severn Valley Railway. The series also featured SVR locomotives.
- In the 2005 film The Chronicles of Narnia: The Lion, the Witch and the Wardrobe, GWR Manor no. 7802 Bradley Manor appeared with the train that brought the Pevensies to the nearest station to the Professor's house.
- Victoria Bridge appears briefly in the 2011 film Sherlock Holmes: A Game of Shadows when Holmes pushes Dr Watson's wife, Mary, off a train as it goes over a bridge.
- Bewdley and Kidderminster, locomotive 42968, and the rake of LNER coaches featured in sequences of Dancing on the Edge, a five-part dramatisation by Stephen Poliakoff, filmed in February 2012 and aired in February 2013.
- In 2019, a portion of the Netflix original film Enola Holmes was filmed on the Severn Valley Railway.

== Bibliography ==
- Marshall, John (1989). The Severn Valley Railway. Newton Abbot: David St John Thomas. ISBN 0-946537-45-3.
- Vanns, Michael (2017). The Severn Valley Railway. Pen & Sword. ISBN 9781473892040.
