= Highley railway station =

Station in Shropshire, England

Highley
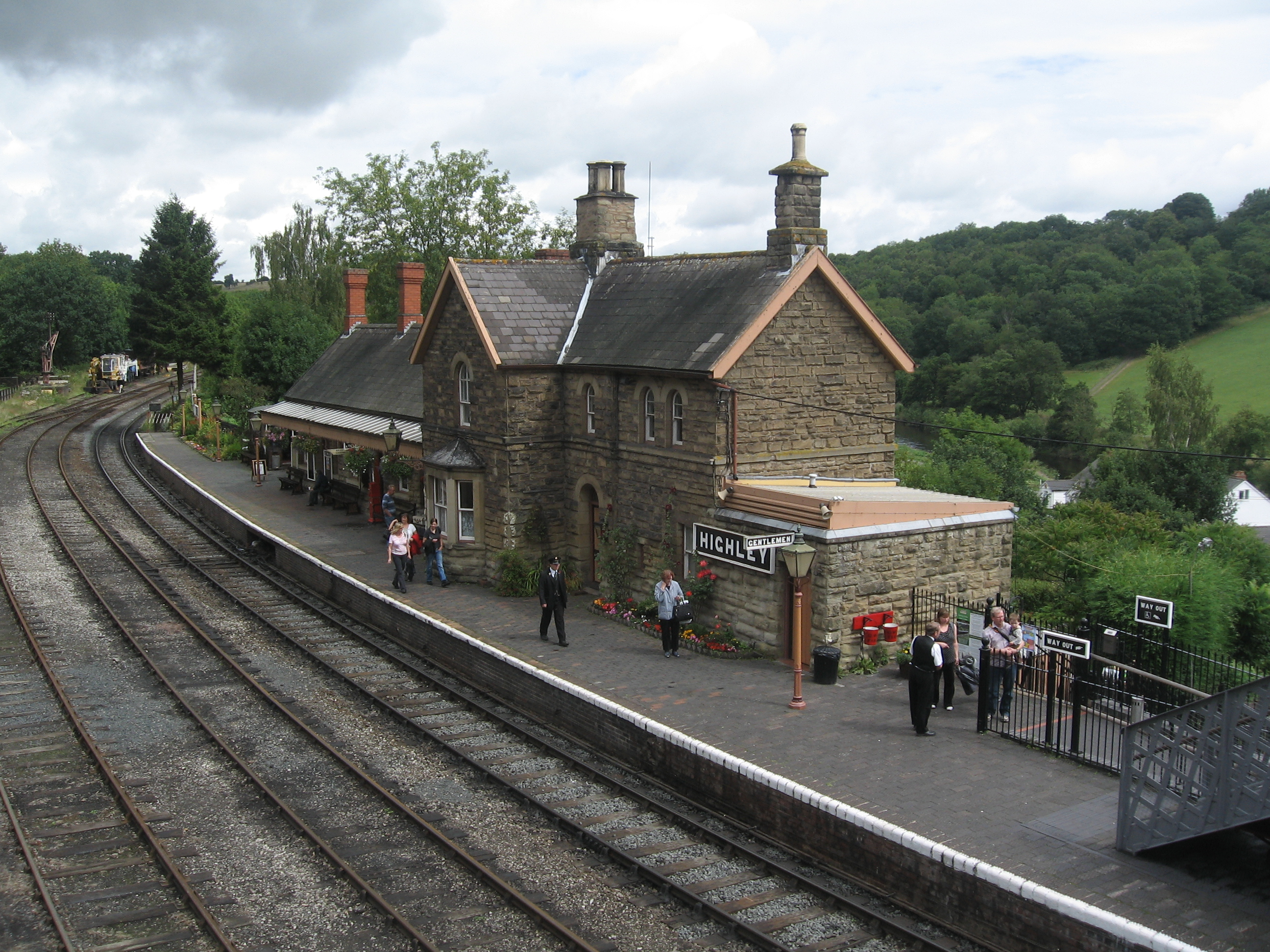

General information
- Location: Highley, Shropshire; England
- Coordinates: 52°26′41.4″N 2°22′14″W
- Grid reference: SO749830
- System: Station on Severn Valley Railway
- Manager: Severn Valley Railway
- Platforms: 1
Location

Highley railway station is a station on the Severn Valley Railway heritage line in Shropshire, near the west bank of the River Severn and just under a mile south-east of the village of Highley. Highley is the only staffed single-platform station on the line. Other stops with one platform are unstaffed halts.

== History ==
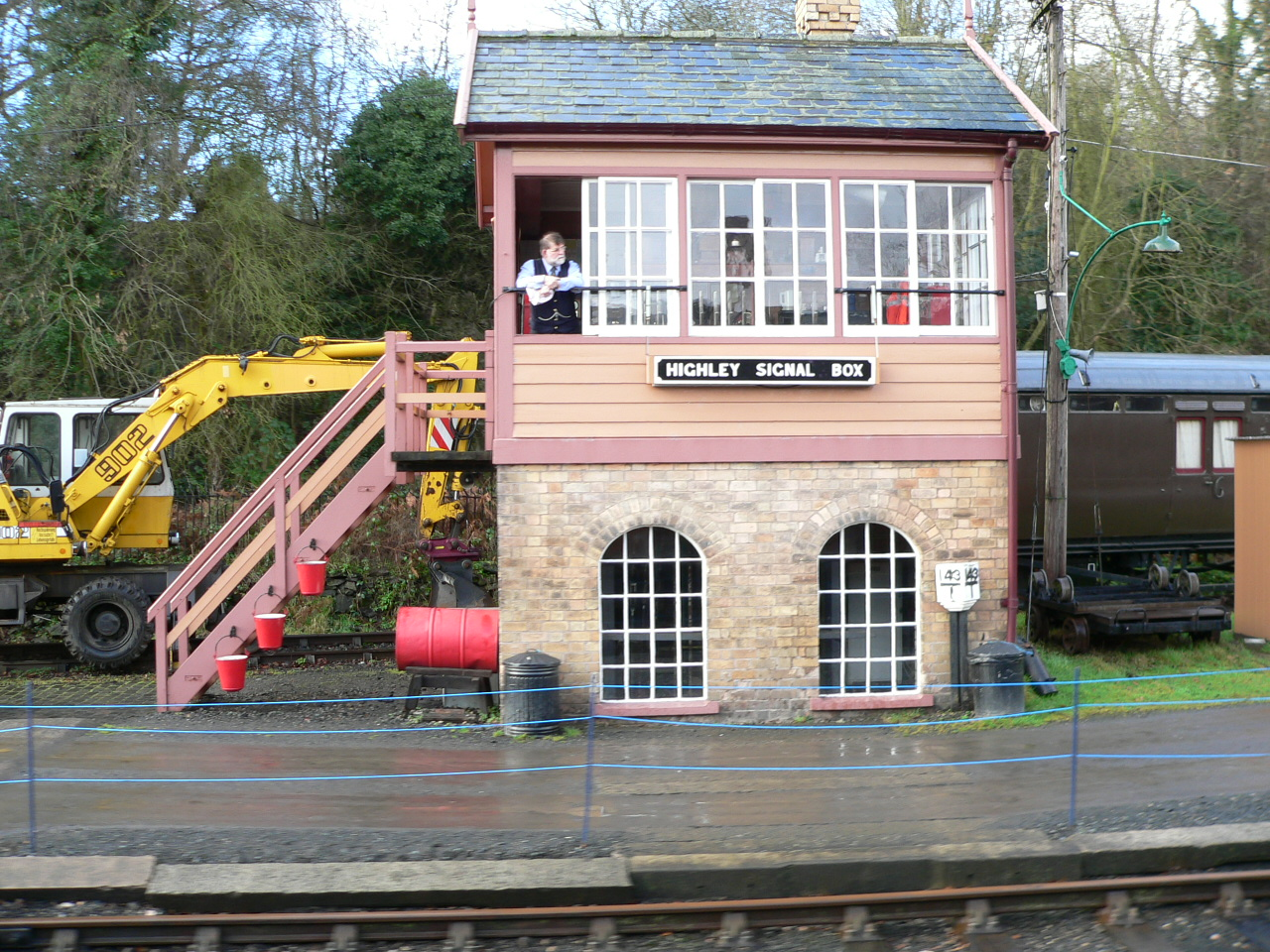
Highley signal box in preservation days

Highley station opened to the public on 1 February 1862 and closed on 9 September 1963, before the Beeching axe closures.

Highley station was important as the transport hub of a colliery district, with four nearby coal mines linked to the Severn Valley line by standard and narrow gauge lines, cable inclines and aerial ropeways . There were extensive sidings along the line, and wagon repair works at Kinlet, half-a-mile south.

The station was inconveniently far from Highley so the arrival of a bus service seriously affected use of the station.

The signal box opposite the platform remained in use until 1969 when Alveley colliery closed and freight traffic ceased. The station site was disused until preservation.

== Preservation ==
Little demolition took place at Highley after closure, the station buildings and the signal box remained intact, however the footbridge was dismantled in the early 1970s for safety reasons. In 2009 Severn Valley Railway erected a new footbridge to ease congestion on the station after the opening of the Engine House.

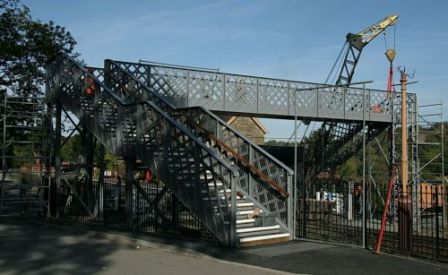
The new footbridge

Between April and mid-May 1974, Highley was the southern terminus of the Severn Valley Railway.

The single platform and the signal box interlocking prevent two trains carrying fare-paying passengers from passing here; although it is possible to pass one passenger train and that of another type i.e. light engine(s), empty stock, engineer's train etc.

== The Engine House ==
The SVR has built a visitor centre, known as the Engine House, a little south of the station.

== Railway infrastructure damage June 2007 ==
After torrential overnight rain on 19 June 2007 areas of the railway near Highley collapsed in landslides. Highley Up Starter signal and the embankment it stood on were washed away. After repair the line between Northwood Halt and Bridgnorth was restored for passenger use and the first public train was on Friday 21 March 2008.

Preceding station	Heritage railways	Following station
Country Park Halt towards Bridgnorth	Severn Valley Railway	Arley towards Kidderminster Town
Historical railways
Alveley Halt; Line open, station closed	West Midland Railway (Severn Valley Line); Great Western Railway	Arley; Line and station open
