= Hampton Loade railway station =

Station in Shropshire, England

Hampton Loade
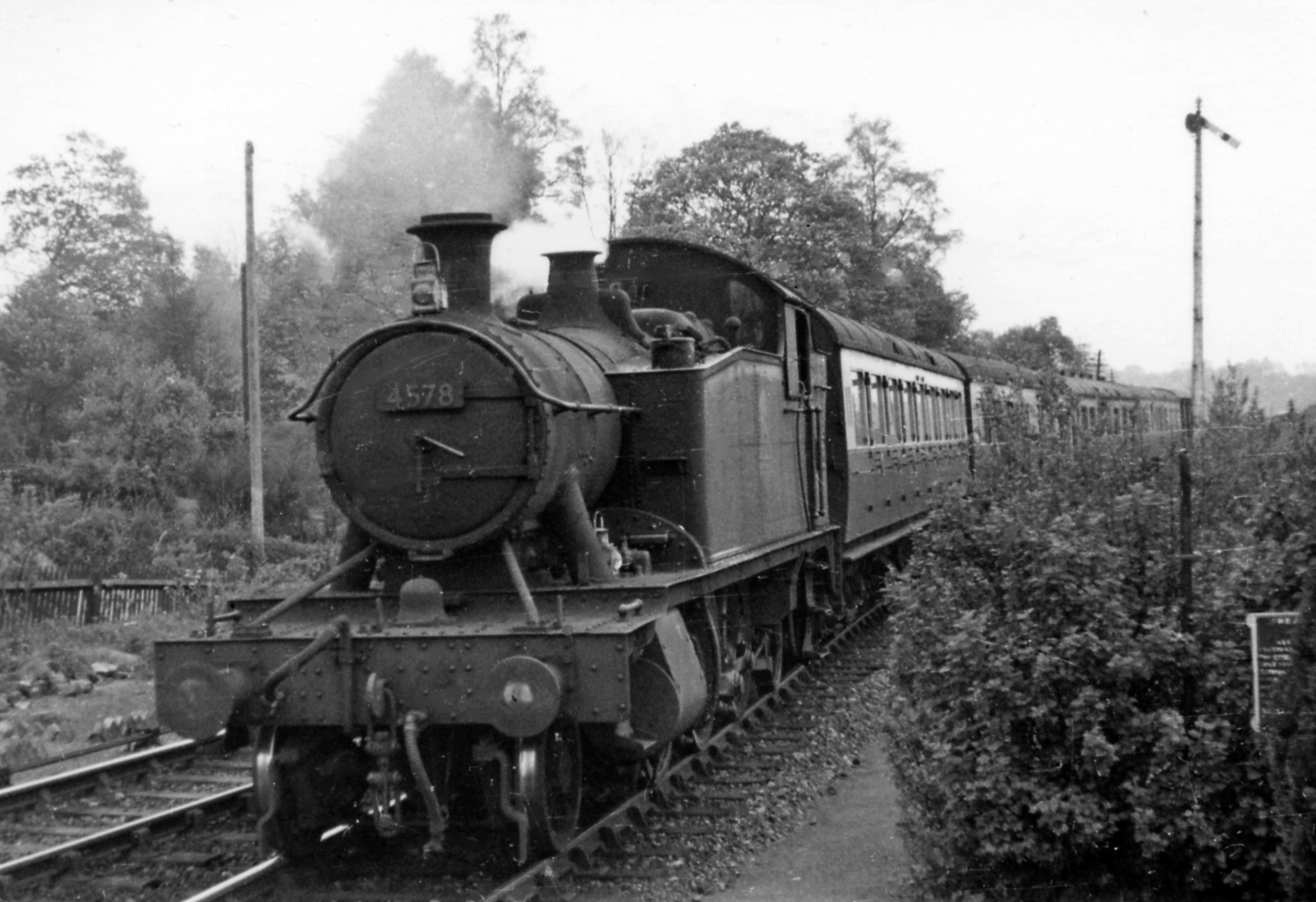
- Shrewsbury – Worcester train entering the station in 1951

General information
- Location: Hampton, Shropshire; England
- Coordinates: 52.47382°N 2.37715°W
- Grid reference: SO744862
- System: Station on Severn Valley Railway
- Manager: Severn Valley Railway
- Platforms: 2
Location

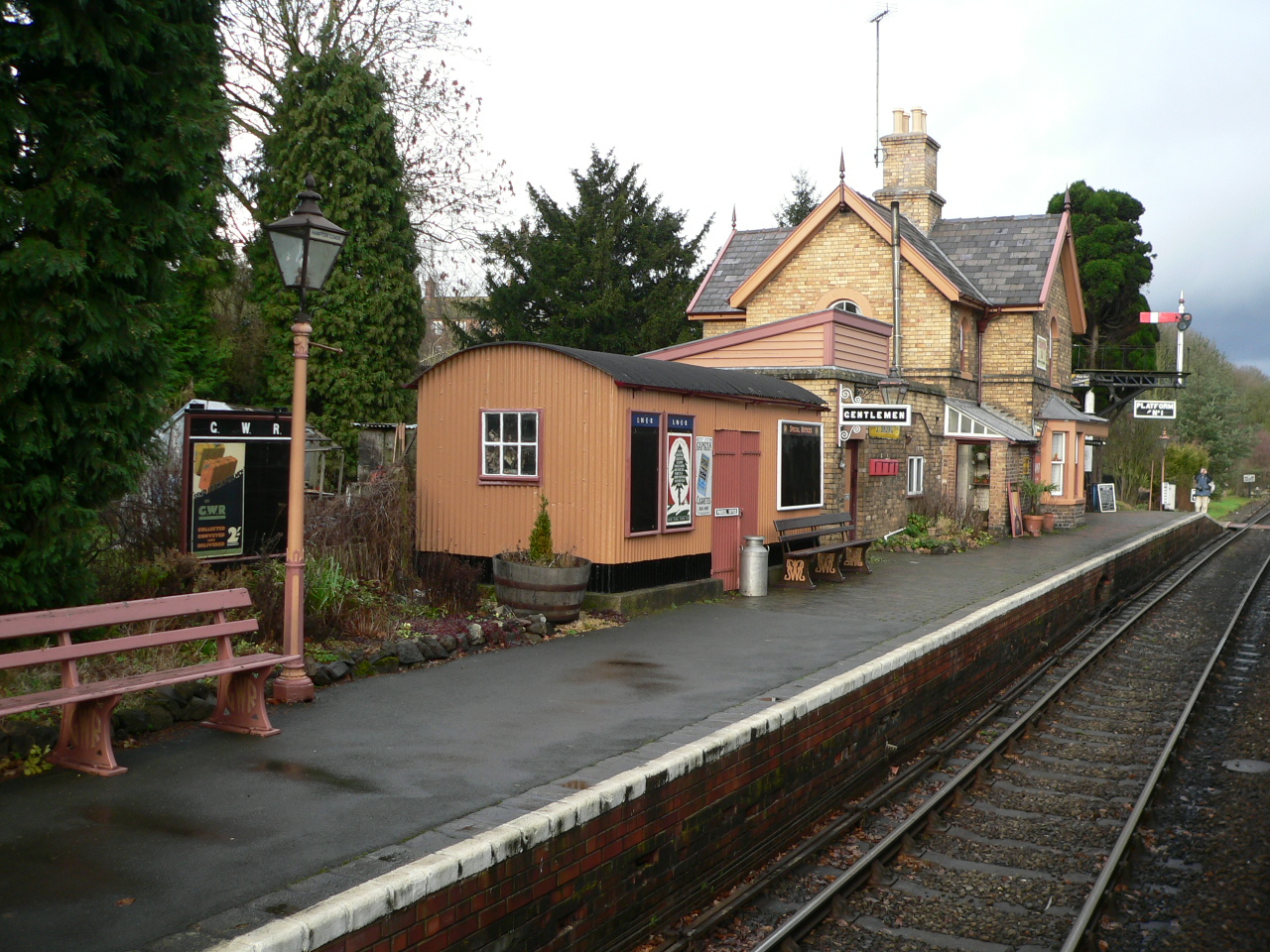
Down platform looking towards Bridgnorth

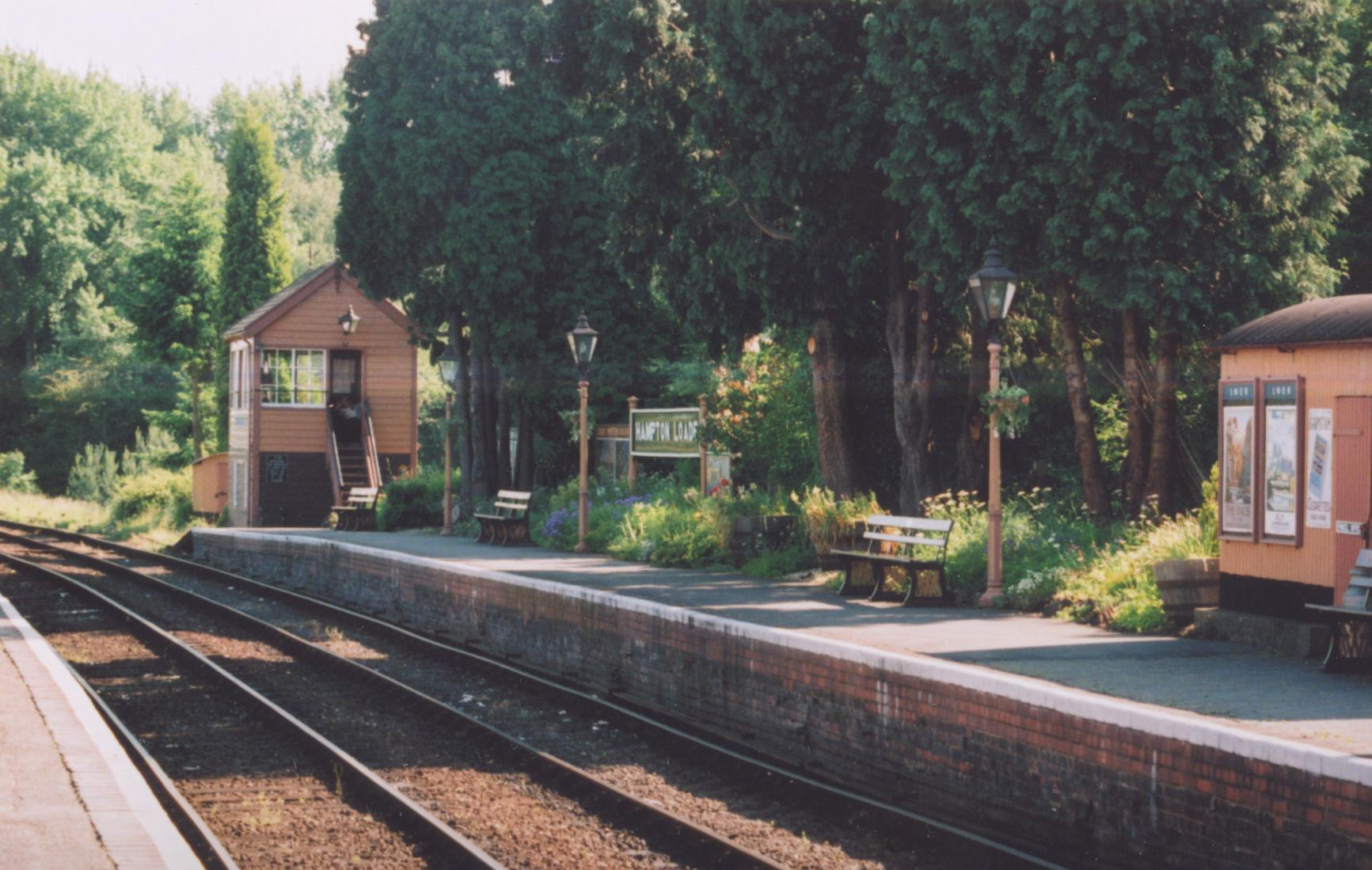
Down platform looking towards Highley

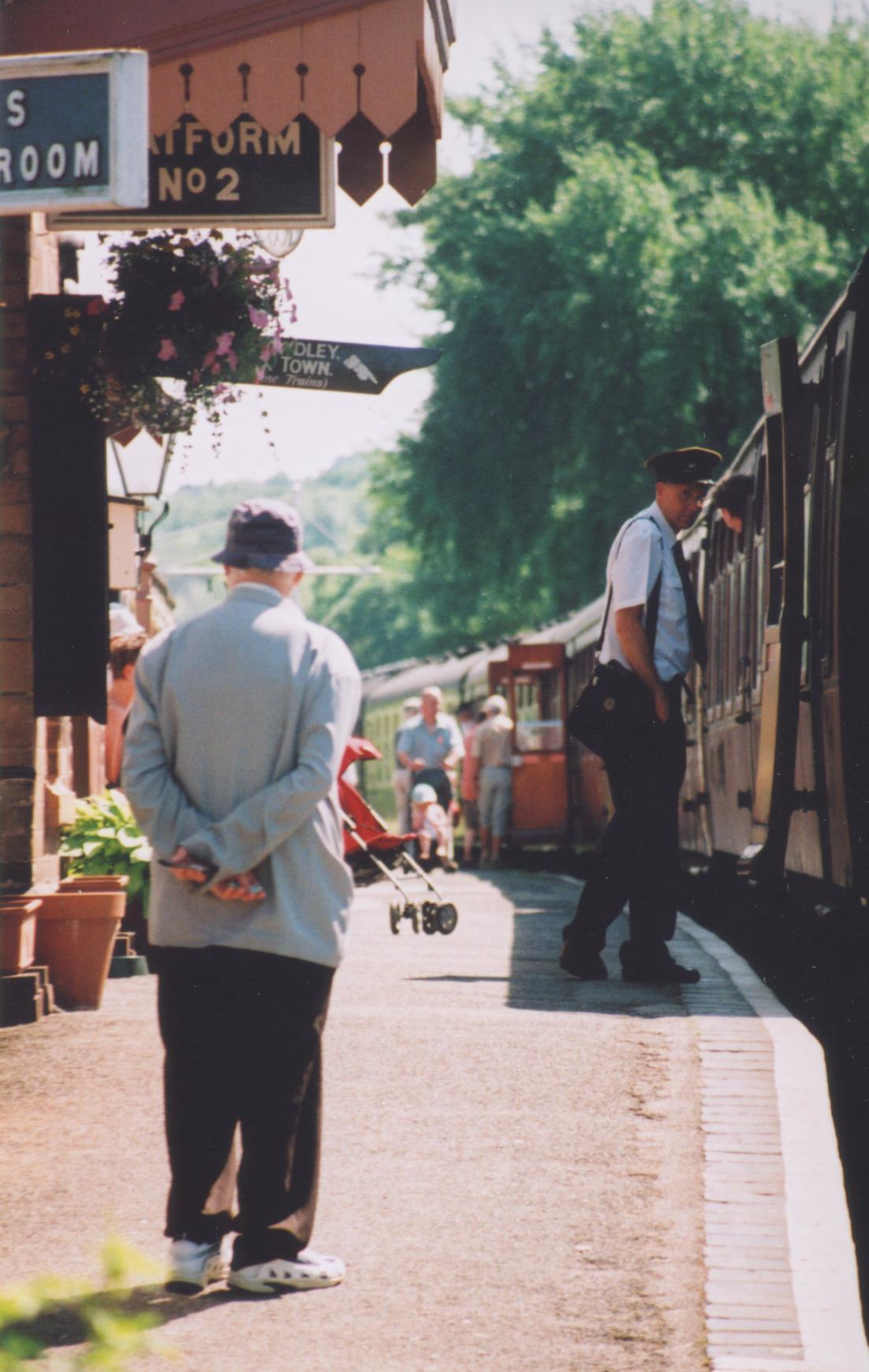
Up Platform

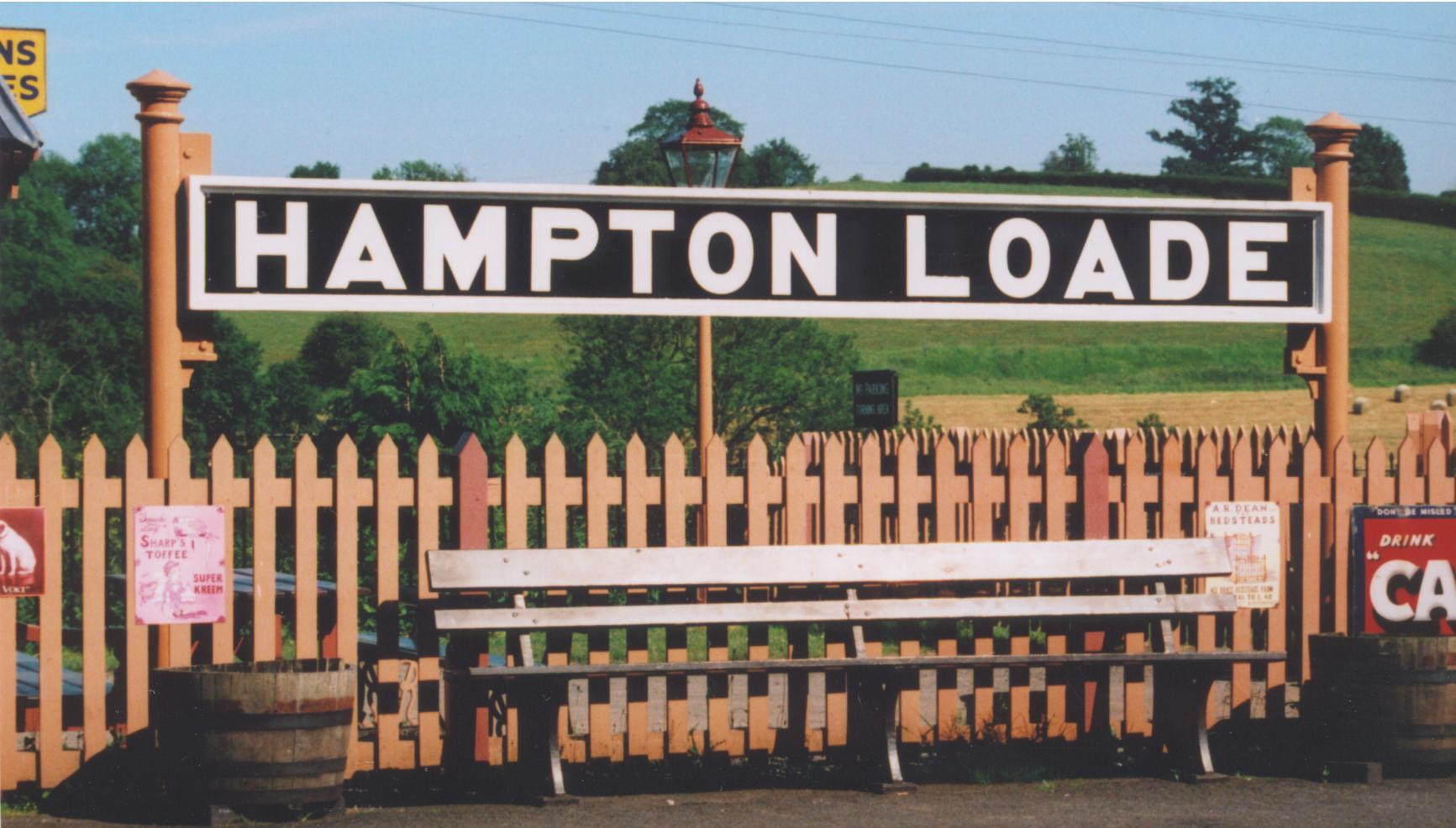
Up Platform Running-in Board

Hampton Loade railway station is a station on the Severn Valley Railway heritage line, close to the hamlet of Hampton on the western bank of the River Severn; Hampton Loade itself is on the eastern bank, and can no longer be reached by the Hampton Loade Ferry across the river as this has ceased operation.

== History ==
Hampton Loade station opened as part of the Severn Valley Line on 1 February 1862, appearing as 'Hampton' in the public timetable. It was originally built with one platform and siding; a passing-loop and second platform being added in 1883. There was also a weighbridge located on the river side of the site at one point.

The station is actually on the west side of the River Severn in the hamlet of Hampton but was renamed within a month of opening after Hampton Loade, the larger hamlet on the eastern side of the river. Due to the presence of Hampton Loade station in Hampton most residents now refer to their hamlet as Hampton Loade. Most of the local passenger traffic came from the eastern side of the river using the current operated foot reaction ferry to get to the station. The station was always popular with anglers due to the easy access to the river. The station was host to a GWR camp coach in 1939.

Although closed by British Rail during the implementation of the Beeching Axe in 1963, plans for its closure had already been made before Beeching's report was published. Following closure all signalling equipment was removed from Hampton Loade, and the signal box was almost completely demolished after purchase from BR by the residents of Station House for use as a chicken coop.

== Preservation ==
From 1970 to 1974, Hampton Loade was the southern terminus of the SVR, just 4 1/2 miles from Bridgnorth. Although at the time the SVR was said to go from "somewhere" to "nowhere" the terminus was a quaint and peaceful place to end services.

When preservationists first arrived at Hampton Loade from Bridgnorth, signalling was reinstated as a priority during the early days, mainly using equipment from the closed Stourport-on-Severn station. A legacy of Hampton Loade's former guise as the SVR's southern terminus is the now rarely used down starting signal No. 13 at the north end of the up loop. The platforms at Hampton Loade can only accommodate around four coaches at a time, this or less being the norm in GWR and BR days. As the SVR's trains are longer than this plans have been mooted to extend the platforms.

The current Station Master is Lee Whittaker. Retired railwayman Steve Dockerty is Chief Booking Clerk. The station is operated entirely by a volunteer workforce.

There are a number of items of rolling stock in the sidings at Hampton Loade. These include British Railways built no. 3467; a 'fruit D' goods van designed by the GWR and built at Swindon in 1955. It is owned by the Hampton Loade Station Fund and is in use as the station fund shop, known on the SVR as a 'treasure trove' for railwayana and books. It is currently painted in GWR freight grey and lettered with the words 'return to Helston'. It later had a number of W3467W and was preserved in 1973. The oldest carriage on the line, the ex-GWR Churchward third coach 2426 of 1910, was used for staff accommodation at Hampton Loade for 28 years before being moved to Kidderminster in September 2016 for overhaul. Its place has been taken by GWR Riding Van 55 built in 1908.

The station takes part in the annual SVR's 1940s weekends, held over a week with two weekends in June/July. The weekends are a look back at the 1940s and also underline the important part Britain's railways played in the Second World War. For this event the station has a 'Dig for Victory' allotment, Bren gun, an ARP warden's post, unexploded bombs, R.T.O. Office and several period vehicles along with a standard 'blast tape and sandbags' appearance.

Since being reopened in SVR preservation the station has also become home to several relocated corrugated huts of typical GWR design. These being a lamp room from Cleobury Mortimer, a larger hut from Bearley and another from Kingham. All are painted in the GWR Stone colours. Also on the down platform is a larger hut original to the station, being installed by the GWR at sometime in the 1920s.

== Signalling ==
Hampton Loade signal box controls three points, two distant signals, three starter signals, three home signals, and a set of catch points with related "Dummy" signal. Two of the points are located at either end of the station, controlling the exits to the loop, the third set of points controls the entrance to the siding, and are protected by the "Dummy" signal and its catch points. There are starter signals on the end of the down and up platforms, as well as an extra starter signal on the Bridgnorth end of the up platform which permits down trains starting at Hampton Loade to be despatched from the up platform. The home signals are located just before the loop entrance points that they protect, in the up direction a bracket carries two homes controlling entrance to the loop and main line, in the down direction a single home controls entry to the main line. In both directions working distant signals protect the homes.

== The Paddock Railway ==
The station is also the home of the 32mm gauge (1:19 scale) model/garden Paddock Railway, which celebrated its 25th anniversary in 2013.

== Barry Railway Coach No 163 ==
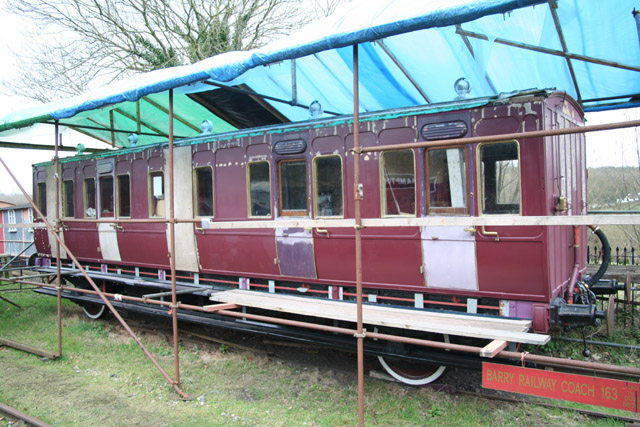
Barry Coach 163 (2009)

Hampton Loade was home to Barry Railway coach 163 for over three decades. An 1895 6-wheel, 5 compartment first and second class composite built at Ashburys in Manchester, it was renumbered 6058 by the Great Western Railway in 1922 before being scrapped at Swindon on 24 November 1928. The body went to the Clent Hills near Birmingham becoming a holiday home, where it remained until 1992. It was mounted onto a 4-wheel ex-Southern Railway Van C underframe on 16 August 2003. Restoration then continued, but was still incomplete when the owning group announced in 2022 that they had agreed with the Severn Valley Railway that the coach would leave the railway. It left Hampton Loade in May 2024 to move to the Gwili Railway.

== Film and television ==
The station has been used as the filming location for many films and TV programmes, including The Englishman Who Went Up a Hill But Came Down a Mountain, Mad Dogs and the 1970s TV series Carrie's War.

Preceding station	Heritage railways	Following station
Bridgnorth Terminus	Severn Valley Railway	Country Park Halt towards Kidderminster Town
Historical railways
Eardington Halt; Line open, station closed	West Midland Railway (Severn Valley Line); Great Western Railway	Alveley Halt; Line open, station closed
