= Arley railway station =

Station in Worcestershire, England

Arley
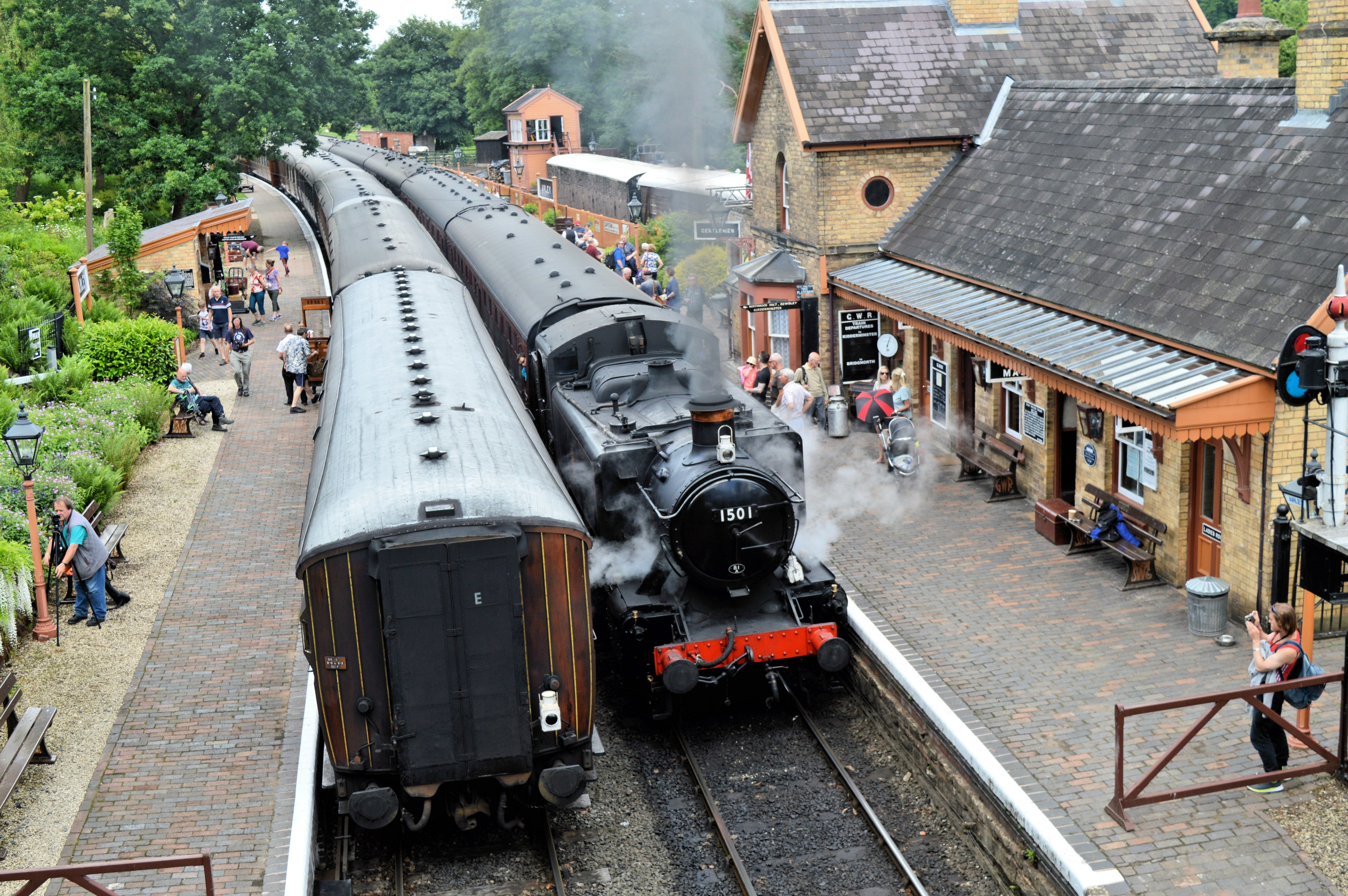
- Trains passing at Arley, with GWR 1501 in charge

General information
- Location: Arley, Wyre Forest; England
- Coordinates: 52°25′01″N 2°20′53″W
- Grid reference: SO764799
- System: Station on heritage railway
- Operator: Severn Valley Railway
- Platforms: 2

History
- Original company: West Midland Railway (Severn Valley Line)
- Pre-grouping: GWR
- Post-grouping: GWR

Key dates
- 1 February 1862: Opened
- 9 September 1963: Closed
- 18 May 1974: Opened by SVRPS
Location

Arley railway station is a station on the Severn Valley Railway (SVR) heritage line in Worcestershire, situated just over the River Severn from the village of Upper Arley; a footbridge crosses the river to link the station to the village. The station is about 1/2 mile (0.8 km) north of Victoria Bridge, on which the SVR crosses the River Severn.

== History ==
The station was built along with the line in 1862 and opened on 1 February that year. The first signal box was built in 1883, and the platform built to accommodate six coach trains. The main brick-built station building, which holds the booking office, is located on the easterly platform. The local transport needs were met quite adequately, as the local roads and paths were, to say the least, primitive. Passenger trade was busiest with summer holiday visitors, and Arley was home to a small goods yard.

Opened by the West Midland Railway (Severn Valley Line), and absorbed by the Great Western Railway on 1 August 1863, the station stayed with that company during the Grouping of 1923, passing on to the Western Region of British Railways during the nationalisation of 1948. It was later closed by the British Railways Board.

Although closed by the BRB on 9 September 1963 during the implementation of the Beeching Axe, plans for its closure had already been made before Beeching's report was published. The passing loop was taken out, sidings cut up and platforms removed, with only Alveley coal traffic surviving. In 1969 the line through Arley finally became disused.

Preceding station	Heritage railways	Following station
Highley towards Bridgnorth	Severn Valley Railway	Northwood Halt towards Kidderminster Town
Historical railways
Highley; Line and station open	West Midland Railway (Severn Valley Line); Great Western Railway	Northwood Halt; Line and station open

== Preservation ==
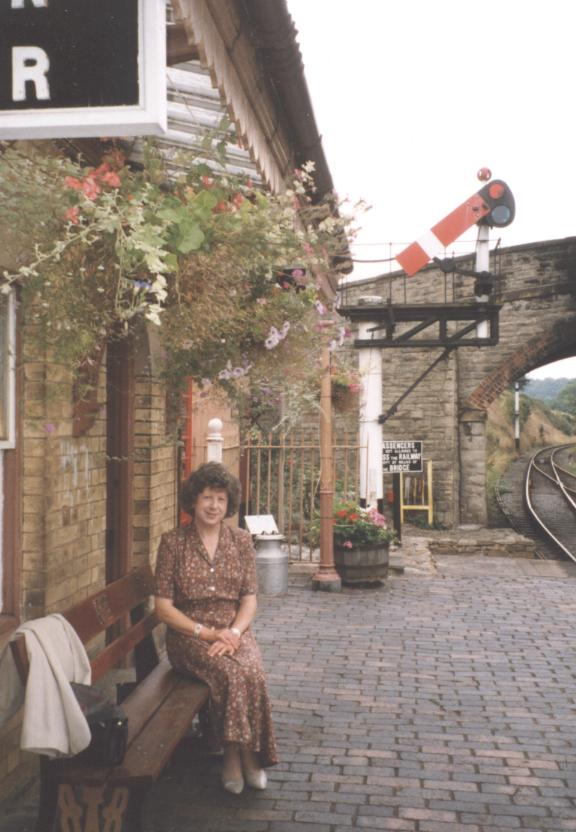
Arley station and GWR signal looking south in 1995

When the line was reopened by SVR preservationists working up from Bridgnorth in 1974, work got underway to restore Arley to its former glory. The main railway building was in relatively good condition and was totally renovated. The platforms were rebuilt and the track re-laid. A fully signalled passing loop enables full length north and southbound trains to stop and pass each other within the station limits.

The old signal box having been demolished, a replacement of LNWR design was bought from BR and brought in from Yorton, near Whitchurch, Shropshire, with the lever frame from the signal box at Kidderminster station. The station was re-opened on 18 May 1974.

== In popular culture ==
Arley station has been used as a filming location for several films and TV programmes, such as Disney's Candleshoe, BBC sitcom Oh, Doctor Beeching!, The Box of Delights and the ChuckleVision episode "Oh Brother". The station was also used for the filming of the opening scene of the 2020 film Enola Holmes.

== Gallery ==
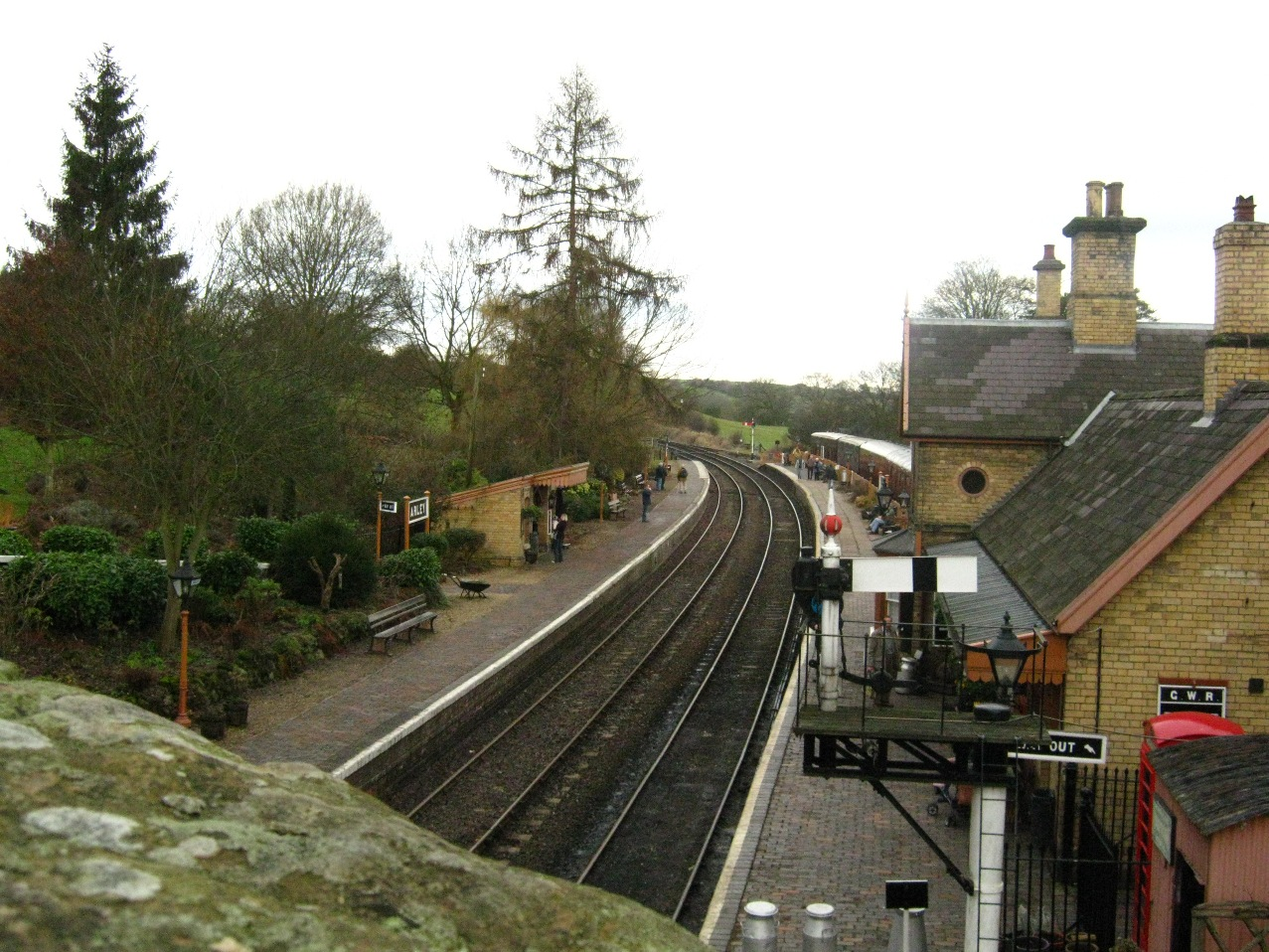
Arley railway station

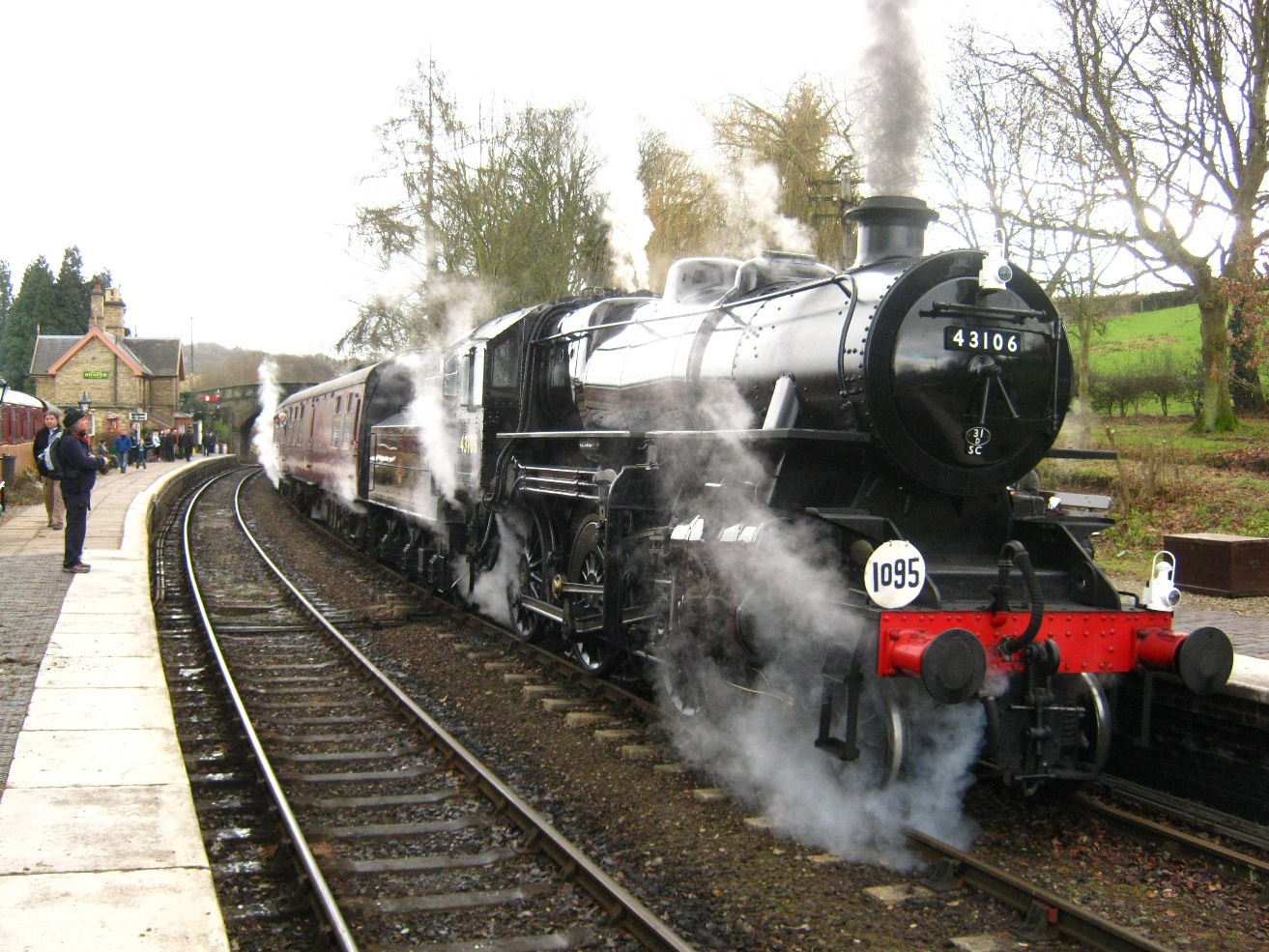
Ivatt 4 43106 at Arley station.

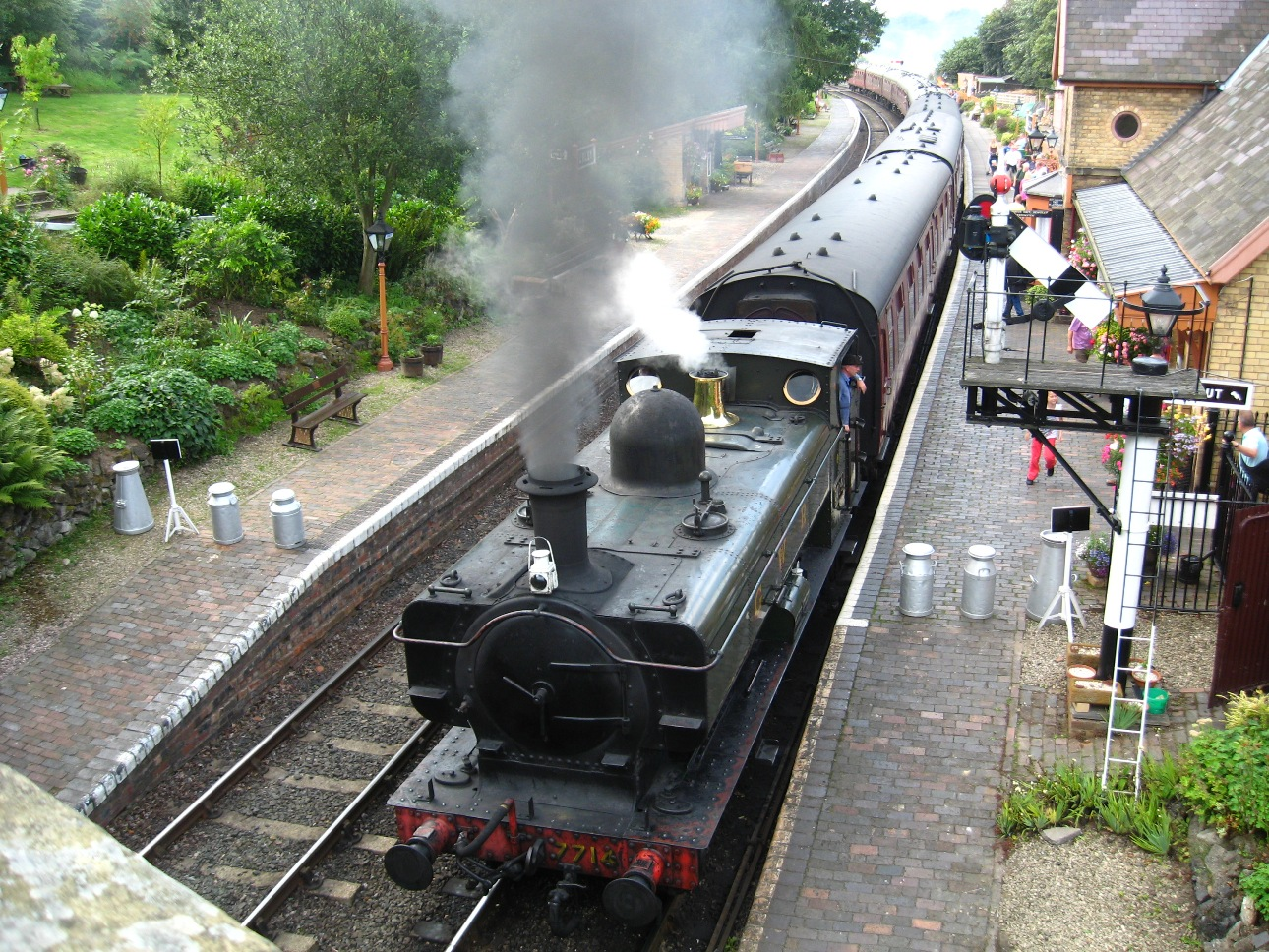
GWR 5700 Class 7714 waits at Arley station, bound for Kidderminster
