= Victoria Bridge, Worcestershire =

Bridge crossing the River Severn in Worcestershire, England

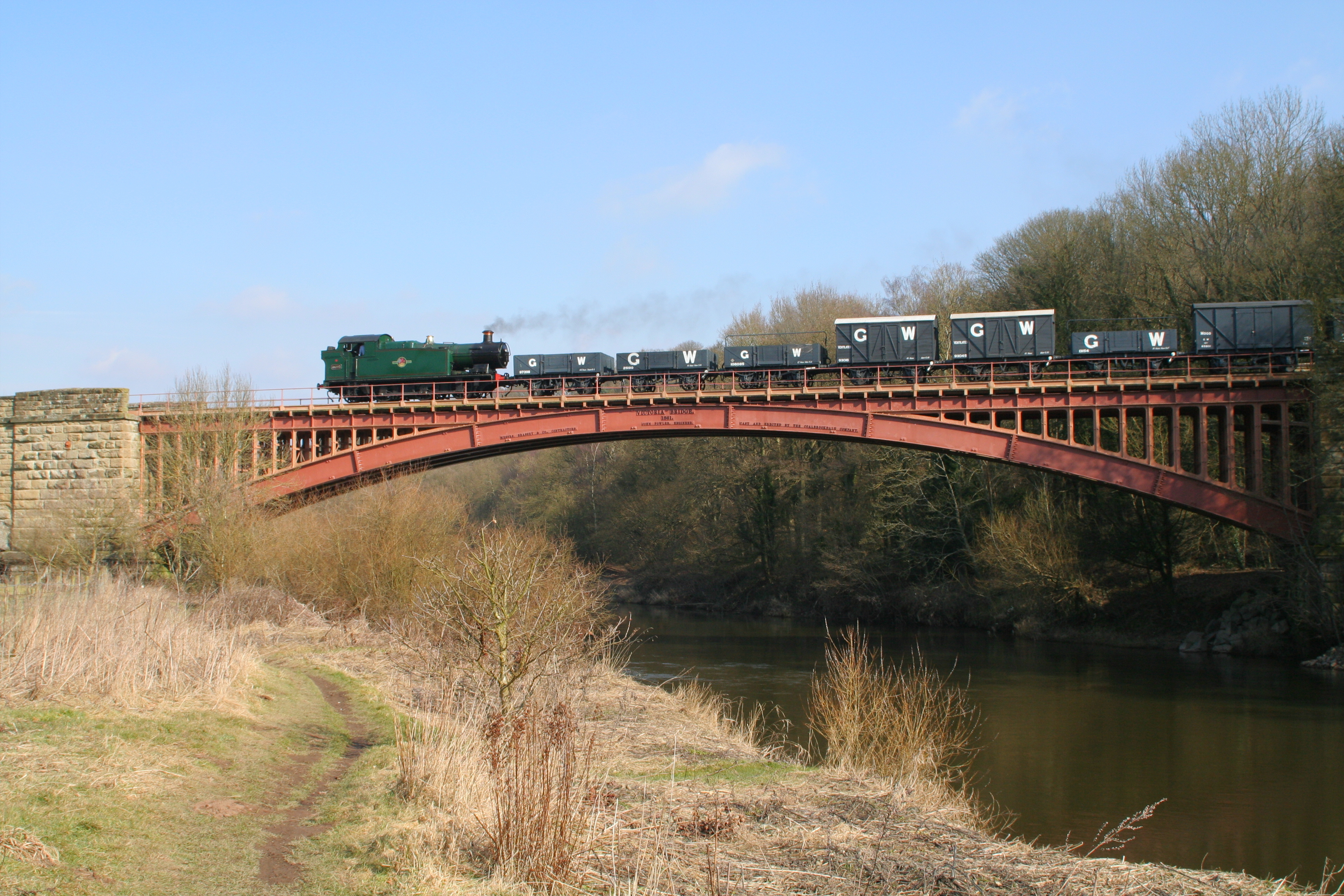
- Goods train crossing the Victoria Bridge
- Coordinates: 52°24′39″N 2°20′40″W
- OS grid reference: SO 76665 79254
- Carries: Severn Valley Railway
- Crosses: River Severn
- Locale: Upper Arley, Worcestershire
- Named for: Queen Victoria
- Heritage status: Grade II* listed building

Characteristics
- Design: Arch bridge
- Material: Cast iron
- Pier construction: Sandstone ashlar
- Total length: 200 ft (61 m)
- No. of spans: 1

Rail characteristics
- No. of tracks: 1
- Track gauge: 4 ft 8.5 in (1,435 mm)

History
- Designer: John Fowler
- Constructed by: Thomas Brassey; Samuel Morton Peto; Edward Betts
- Fabrication by: Coalbrookdale Co
- Construction start: 24 November 1859
- Construction end: 10 May 1861
- Opened: 31 January 1862

The Victoria Bridge crosses the River Severn between Arley and Bewdley in Worcestershire, England. At the time of its construction, the 200-foot railway bridge was the longest single span cast iron bridge in Britain.

The cast-iron arch bridge has four arch ribs each of nine parts bolted together. The arch elements were cast by the Coalbrookdale Company and the bridge was built by Thomas Brassey, Samuel Morton Peto and Edward Betts. Its design is almost identical to the Albert Edward Bridge which spans the Severn at Coalbrookdale in Shropshire, both designed by John Fowler.

Opened for traffic on 31 January 1862, the railway line was closed to traffic in 1963. The bridge survived the threat of demolition and was then used by the Severn Valley Railway. In May 1974, heritage passenger services were re-introduced between Alveley Colliery and Bewdley over the Victoria Bridge. It was restored in 2004. The bridge has appeared in several films, including the 1978 film The Thirty-Nine Steps.

== Construction ==
The Victoria Bridge was constructed to carry the Severn Valley Railway over the River Severn just south of Upper Arley. The line was 40 mi (64 km) long running from Hartlebury in Worcestershire to Shrewsbury in Shropshire, passing through several towns including Stourport-on-Severn, Bridgnorth, and Ironbridge. The line was built between 1858 and 1862 and it was opened on 31 January 1862 and regular services commenced the following day.

The bridge was designed by John Fowler, the chief engineer of the Severn Valley Railway. It is a single cast-iron segmental arch, considered to be quite large for the era, with a span of 200 ft (61 m) and a 20 ft (6.1 m) rise. The bridge arch has four ribs made up of nine H-section pieces bolted together; the ribs are cross-braced by tie bars with tensioning nuts and the spandrels are perforated by vertical slots. The weight of the ironwork has been estimated at about 500 t (490 long tons; 550 short tons). The ironwork was cast by the Coalbrookdale Company.

The bridge abutments are made of rusticated sandstone ashlar, topped by plain parapets. Each abutment has a single 12-ring blue brick arch to provide river-side access. Along the west bank, the towpath is carried around the abutment on a walkway plinth that juts out into the river. On the east side the abutment wall drops straight to the river. The single track is carried on a ballasted timber deck even though the bridge is wide enough to accommodate double tracks.

On 24 November 1859, the bridge's foundation stone was laid by Henry Orlando Bridgeman using a ceremonial silver trowel presented to him by the contractors. The contractors involved in the bridge's construction included Thomas Brassey, Samuel Morton Peto and Edward Betts. A time capsule was placed under the foundation stone. The glass jar contained silver and copper coins and a signed paper with details of the occasion. By early February 1861, the foundations were completed.

The four cast iron ribs were put in place and on 10 May 1861, bridge was completed. Commemorative inscriptions were cast into the midspan of the arch ring on each face of the bridge. They read, "Victoria Bridge, 1861. John Fowler, Engineer" (central position) "Messrs. Brassey & Co., Contractors" (left position) and "Cast and erected by the Coalbrookdale Company" (right position).

The Victoria Bridge was the longest single-span bridge made of cast iron in Britain when built. Its design was replicated by Fowler when he built the similar Albert Edward Bridge over the River Severn outside Coalbrookdale.

== Operational use ==
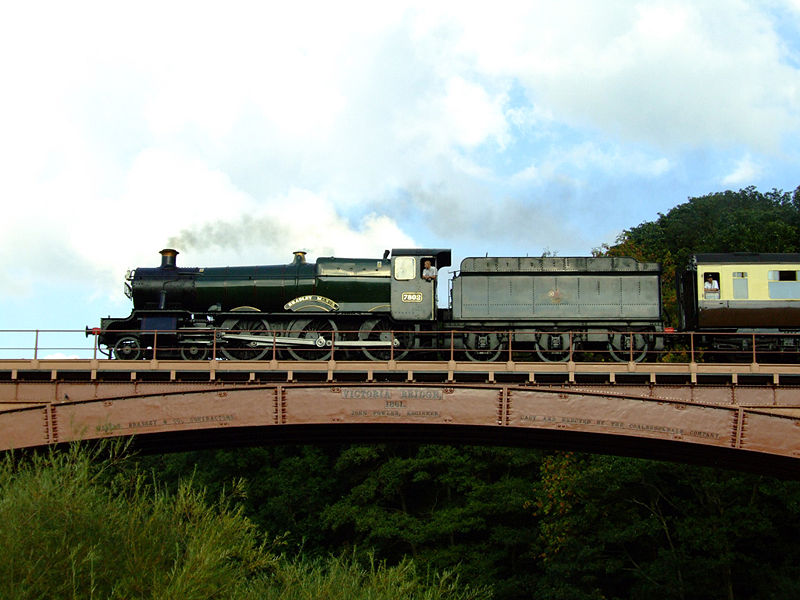
7802 Bradley Manor crossing Victoria Bridge.

In the early 1950s, the bridge deck was relaid. Rail traffic on the line diminished during this period and the planned closure of the northern end of the Severn Valley Branch including Victoria Bridge was announced in 1962, pre-dating the Beeching report. On 9 September 1963, the Severn Valley line was closed to regular passenger services and most freight traffic but the southern portion was used by coal trains up to 1969 and limited passenger services; all such use ended during 1970.

On 6 July 1965, the Severn Valley Railway Society was formed to preserve and restore as much as possible of the line. The new Severn Valley Railway Company was incorporated in May 1967 and set about acquiring as much of the line as its finances would allow. In May 1974, it succeeded in re-introducing passenger services between Alveley Colliery and Bewdley which involved crossing the Victoria Bridge.

Between November 1979 and April 1980, a refurbishment programme was undertaken to safeguard the bridge and its capacity to support 21-tonne axle loading for running train services. The refurbishment cost (£94,346) included the replacement of the transverse timber deck support beams with 54 steel beams. More than half of the iron platework was replaced with steel, 3,500 rivets were replaced with high tensile friction grip bolts and it was painted with 1,200 litres of paint.

In March 1987, the bridge was given Grade II* listed building status.

Because of its age, the bridge has required considerable investment to allow for train operations. In early 1994, about £200,000 of repairs addressed cracks in the bridge's abutments and corrosion in the cast iron girders and cross bracing. To preserve the bridge a 15 mph (24 km/h) speed limit is imposed upon all traffic crossing the bridge.

In early 2004, the bridge was closed for six weeks to install steel mesh material to form a new deck and a repaint. In April 2004, at the reopening ceremony the ribbon was cut by a local woman named Victoria Bridge. Before restoration, the bridge deck made of secondhand timber sleepers was rotting away. Refurbishment cost £320,000, a large proportion of which paid for scaffolding. The project was commended at the 2005 Historic Bridge and Infrastructure Awards by the Institution of Civil Engineers.

== See also ==
- List of crossings of the River Severn

== Bibliography ==
- Cragg, R., Civil Engineering Heritage - Wales & West Central England, Thomas Telford Publishing, 2nd edn., 1997, ISBN 0-7277-2576-9
