= Northwood Halt railway station =

Station in Worcestershire, England

Northwood Halt
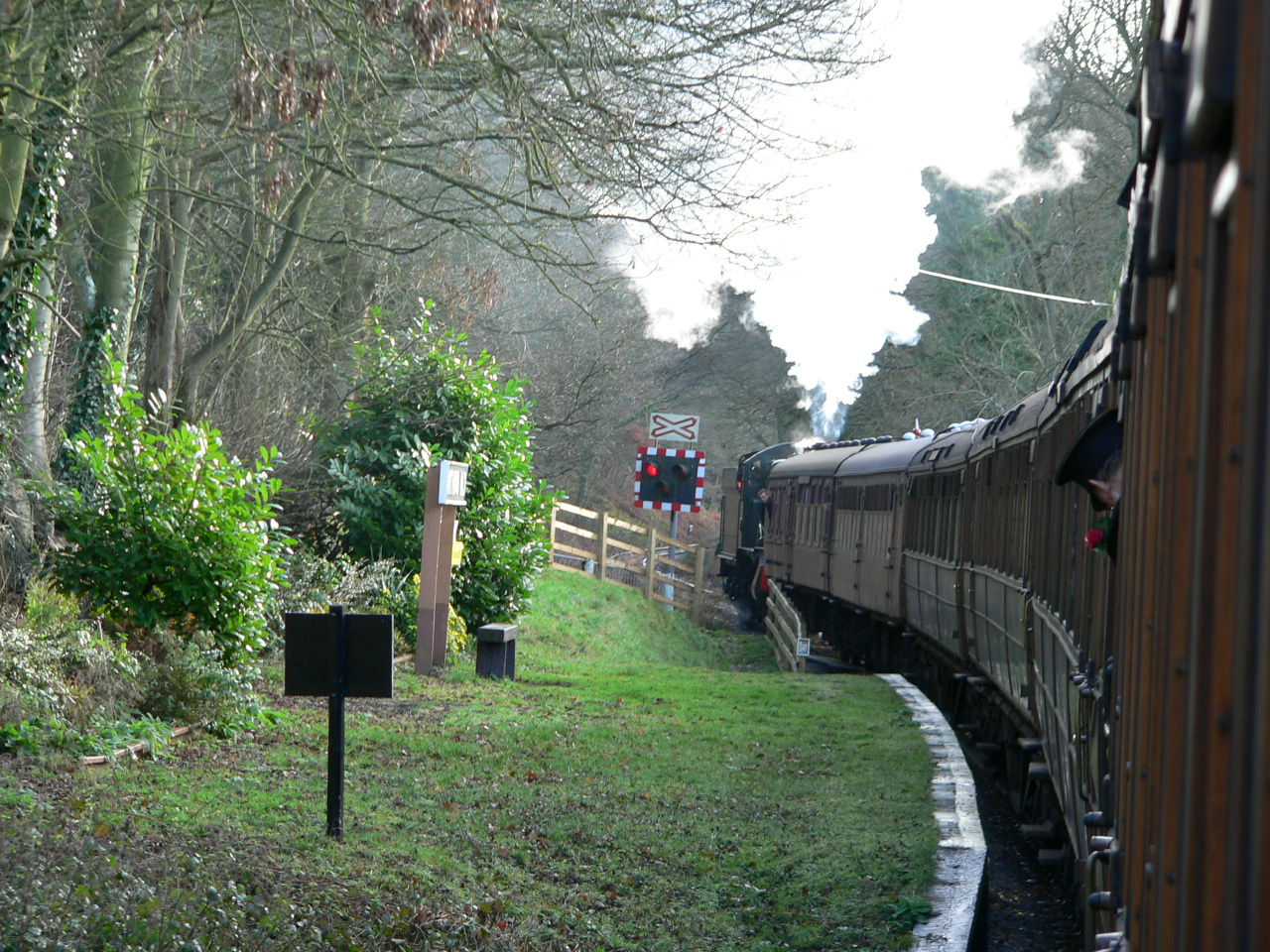
- A train going through Northwood Halt, with the level crossing visible

General information
- Location: North of Bewdley, Worcestershire; England
- Coordinates: 52.3941°N 2.3270°W
- Grid reference: SO778773
- System: Station on the Severn Valley Railway

History
- Original company: Great Western Railway
- Post-grouping: Great Western Railway

Key dates
- June 1935: Opened
- 1963: Closed
- 1974: Reopened
Location

Northwood Halt is an unstaffed request stop on the Severn Valley Railway in Worcestershire, situated a little to the north of Bewdley on the outskirts of the Wyre Forest at the north end of North Wood. There is an ungated level crossing just to the south of the single platform.

== History ==
The halt first opened in June 1935 and was in use until the end of British Railways passenger services north of Bewdley in 1963. Although thought by some people to have been closed as part of the Beeching axe in 1963 its planned closure pre-dated his report. It was well used by fishermen, ramblers and tourists, and was reopened immediately after the SVR's southerly extension of services in 1974. Northwood Halt is not included in the public timetable.

The level crossing is now protected by light signals and an audible warning; this system replaced hand-operated gates, the scene of two serious accidents in 1947 and 1964.

Upon reopening the only shelter for passengers awaiting trains was a wooden shed. This was subsequently replaced with a GWR style pagoda that was constructed by volunteers at Kidderminster.

Preceding station	Heritage railways	Following station
Arley towards Bridgnorth	Severn Valley Railway	Bewdley towards Kidderminster Town
