= Eardington Halt railway station =

Former railway station in Shropshire, England

Eardington Halt
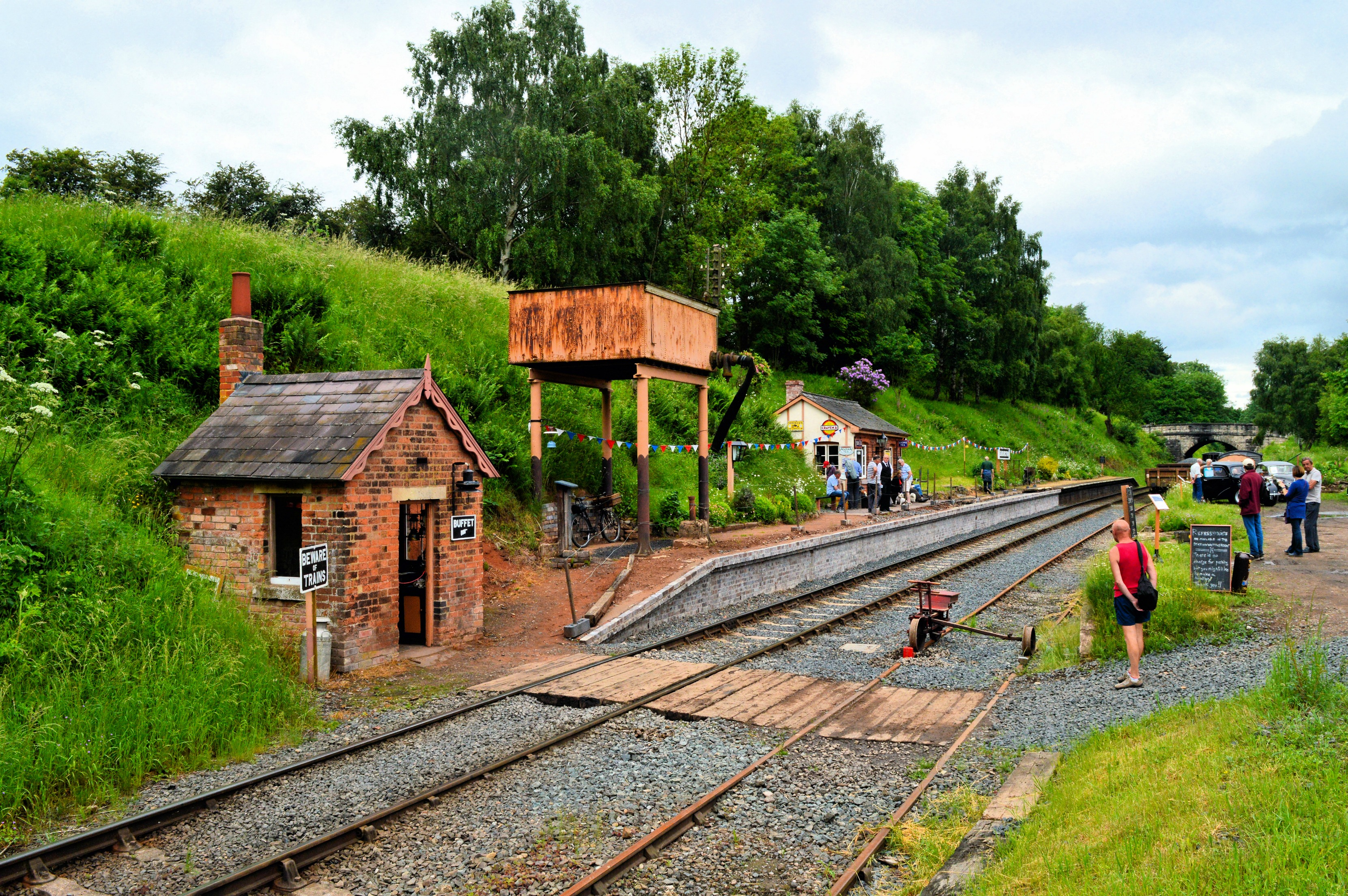
- The station during the celebration of its 150th anniversary in 2018

General information
- Location: Eardington, Shropshire; England
- Coordinates: 52.5017°N 2.4001°W
- Grid reference: SO729894
- System: Station on heritage railway
- Operator: Severn Valley Railway

History
- Pre-grouping: Great Western Railway
- Post-grouping: Great Western Railway

Key dates
- 1 June 1868: Station opened
- 9 September 1963: Closed
- 23 May 1970: Reopened
- 1982: Closed
- 14 September 2023: Reopened
Location

Eardington Halt, originally named Eardington, is a railway station on the Severn Valley Railway near Eardington, south of Bridgnorth, in Shropshire.

== History ==
Eardington was opened on 1 June 1868. It was six years after the opening of the Severn Valley line, mainly to serve the nearby Upper Forge and Lower Forge iron works. It was not readily accessible from the nearby villages of Chelmarsh and Eardington. On 1 April 1949 it was reduced to unstaffed status, although never deemed a halt. The station had a brick waiting room and single platform.

In the later years under British Railways control, Eardington had much of its custom from fishermen at weekends and during the summer months. Although mistakenly thought by some people to have been closed as part of the Beeching axe in 1963 Eardington's planned closure pre-dated his report.

== Preservation ==
When the Severn Valley Railway re-opened in preservation on 23 May 1970, Eardington was the only intermediate stop between Bridgnorth and Hampton Loade, resulting in its being renamed Eardington Halt. It was initially used for watering locomotives, having a ready supply of better quality water than Bridgnorth. The Halt closed temporarily for repair work in October 1979, and briefly reopened in 1981 before being finally deleted from the timetable in 1982. It has not been used in regular service since because of poor custom, land slippage and the fact that the station is situated on a 1-in-100 gradient. Another problem is the combination of the shortness of the platform face, normal SVR practice of marshalling the guard's compartment in the center of the train and the arched over bridge immediately to the north of the platform. This would prevent the train crew from being able to see the guard if the train was stopped with the guard's van on the platform, as is correct practice.

The siding is now used for the storage of permanent way vehicles. A small band of volunteers stage regular "work-ins" to keep the station environs tidy.

In 2023, the SVR announced that following negotiations with the Office of Rail and Road, the station would re-open on limited occasions for trains which would fit the platform, a maximum of four carriages. The timetable for the 2023 Autumn Steam Gala would include trains stopping at Eardington for the first time in 41 years, although initially limited to trains of three carriages.

On Thursday 14 September 2023, the first timetabled services stopped at Eardington, a 4 coach train hauled by LMS Ivatt 4MT 43106.

Preceding station	Heritage railways	Following station
Bridgnorth Terminus	Severn Valley Railway	Hampton Loade towards Kidderminster Town
Historical railways
Bridgnorth; Line and station open	Great Western Railway; Severn Valley Railway	Hampton Loade; Line and station open
