= Stourport-on-Severn railway station =

Former railway station in Worcestershire, England

Stourport-on-Severn
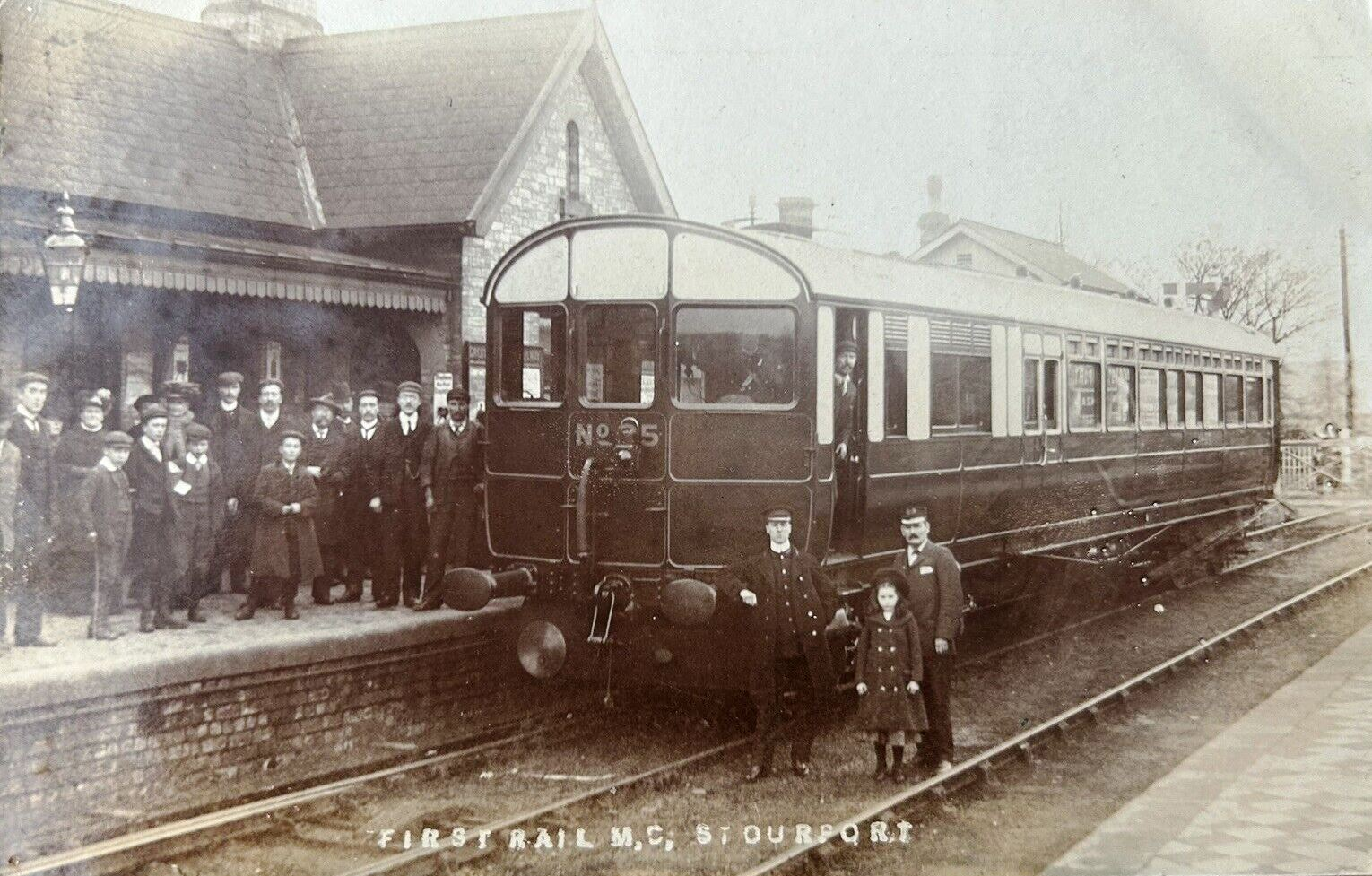

General information
- Location: Stourport-on-Severn, Worcestershire; England
- Coordinates: 52.3449°N 2.2743°W
- Grid reference: SO814718
- Platforms: 2

Other information
- Status: Disused

History
- Original company: Severn Valley Railway
- Pre-grouping: Great Western Railway
- Post-grouping: Great Western Railway

Key dates
- 1862: Opened
- 1934: Renamed Stourport-on-Severn
- 1970: Closed
Location

Stourport-on-Severn railway station was the main station in Stourport-on-Severn, Worcestershire, England.

The station, originally named 'Stourport', opened on 1 February 1862 as part of the Severn Valley Railway. It had two platforms and a passing loop from opening. It was renamed Stourport-on-Severn in October 1934, possibly to avoid confusion with the nearby town of Stourbridge.

The station closed when passenger services between Hartlebury and Bewdley were withdrawn on 5 January 1970. The line to Hartlebury remained open to coal traffic for the former Stourport Power Station until 1982, when it was closed after closure of the power station.

The site is now occupied by housing development although there is a footpath on the former line to Hartlebury and towards the former Stourport Power Station. The trackbed towards Bewdley is now hemmed in by modern development but part of it is still traceable on some maps.

Preceding station	Disused railways	Following station
Burlish Halt; Line and station closed	Great Western Railway; Severn Valley Railway	Hartlebury; Line closed- station open
