= HBY =

HBY may refer to:

- Hartlebury railway station, in England
- Hornsby railway station, in Sydney, Australia
