= 1844 English cricket season =

Cricket season review

The 1844 English cricket season was the 18th of the roundarm era. (Note: Any match listed in the ACS' Important Match Guide (1981) is historically important, and therefore of the highest standard, whether or not a scorecard might exist. The same applies to numerous matches discovered by researchers since 1981. For further information, see First-class cricket.) William Hillyer headed the bowling for the third time in succession.

== Important matches ==
- 1844 match list

== Events ==
13 March. Foundation of the original Cambridgeshire County Cricket Club which played in important matches from 1857 to 1871.

28 August. A match on Hartlebury Common between teams from Worcestershire and Shropshire is the earliest known reference to a county team in Worcestershire.

== Leading batsmen ==
Fuller Pilch was the leading runscorer with 517 @ 17.82

Other leading batsmen were: A Mynn, J Dean, W Dorrinton, T Box, E Bushby, T Sewell, CG Taylor, R Kynaston, W Martingell

== Leading bowlers ==
WR Hillyer was the leading wicket-taker with 142

Other leading bowlers were: A Mynn, FW Lillywhite, J Dean, CG Taylor, W Clarke

== Bibliography ==
- ACS (1981). A Guide to Important Cricket Matches Played in the British Isles 1709–1863. Nottingham: ACS. OCLC 85045528.
- Warner, Pelham (1946). Lords: 1787–1945. London: Harrap. OCLC 877106024.
