= Coalyard Miniature Railway =

Railway in Worcestershire, England

- Locale: Kidderminster, Worcestershire
- Terminus: Kidderminster High Level on Kidderminster Town Station
- Coordinates: 52.381276°N 2.240814°W
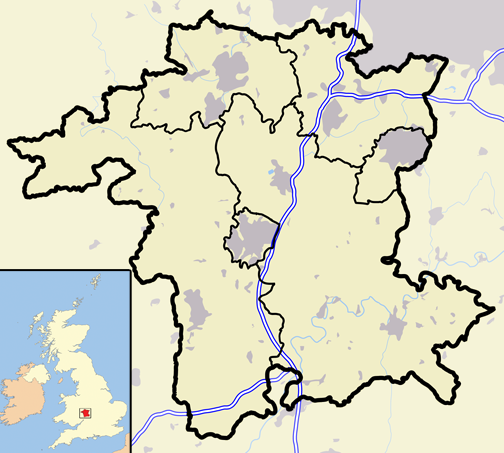
- Connections: None

Commercial operations
- Name: Coalyard Miniature Railway
- Built by: Severn Valley Railway
- Original gauge: 5 in (127 mm) & 3 1/2 in (89 mm)

Preserved operations
- Operated by: Coalyard Miniature Railway
- Stations: Four (Two halts and two Termini)
- Length: 390.42 yards (357 m)
- Preserved gauge: 7 1/4 in (184 mm)

Commercial history
- Opened: 1988

The Coalyard Miniature Railway, opened in 1988, and relaid in 1990 as a 7 1/4 in (184 mm) gauge railway, operates in the grounds of the Severn Valley Railway’s Kidderminster Town Station.

== History ==
The railway started as 100 metres (328 ft) of dual gauge track comprising 3 1/2 in (89 mm) gauge rails laid within 5 in (127 mm) gauge rails, to permit operation of both a 5 in (127 mm) King Class Locomotive and a 3 1/2 in (89 mm) Hall class locomotive. The track was unusual in being constructed of continuously welded rails.

In 1990 a new 7 1/4 in (184 mm) gauge aluminium track was laid and then gradually extended until it reached the far end of the Kidderminster Town Station car park. The original line was then removed, making space for a new footpath from the Severn Valley Railway car park to the station. The line originally used wooden sleepers but when these wore out they were replaced with plastic sleepers.

The Railway is 357 metres (390.42 yd) long and runs alongside the Severn Valley Railway platforms and past the water column, where one can see many of the Severn Valley's fleet of locomotives.
