= Burlish Halt railway station =

Former railway station in Worcestershire, England

Burlish Halt
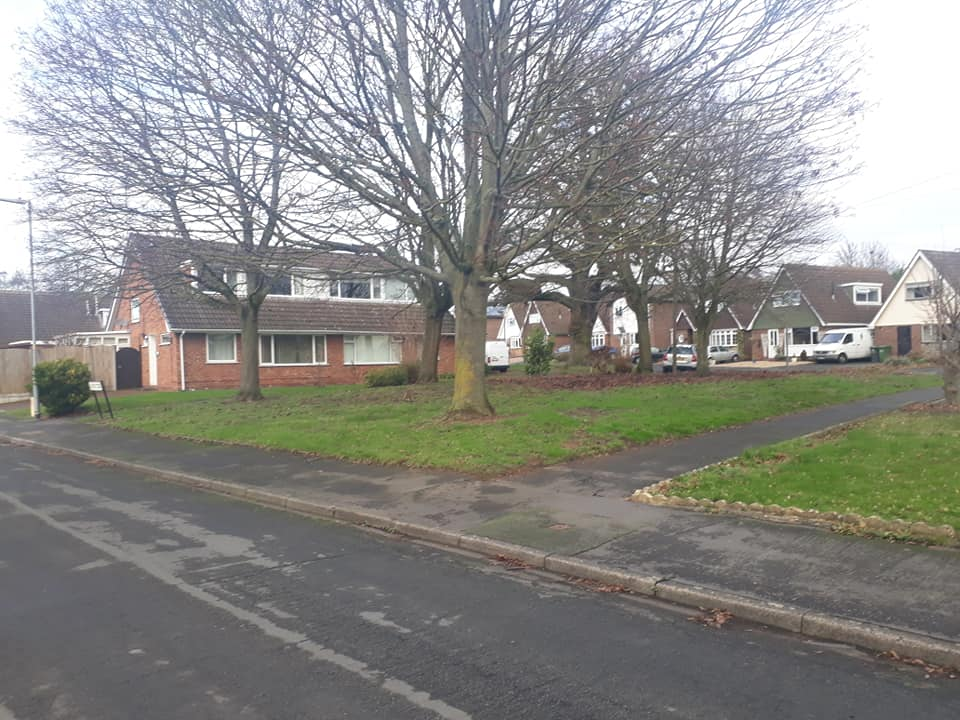
- The site of the station in 2018

General information
- Location: Stourport-on-Severn, Worcestershire; England
- Coordinates: 52.3502°N 2.2850°W
- Grid reference: SO806725
- Platforms: 1

Other information
- Status: Disused

History
- Post-grouping: Great Western Railway

Key dates
- 1930: Opened
- 1970: Closed
Location

Burlish Halt railway station was a station on the Severn Valley Railway in Stourport-on-Severn, Worcestershire, England. The halt opened on 31 March 1930 and closed in 1970. Since closure all trace of the railway has been removed and the site is now covered by housing development.

Preceding station	Disused railways	Following station
Bewdley; Line closed- station open	Great Western Railway; Severn Valley Railway	Stourport-on-Severn; Line and station closed
