= Eardington =

Village in Shropshire, England

Coordinates: 52.512°N 2.410°W

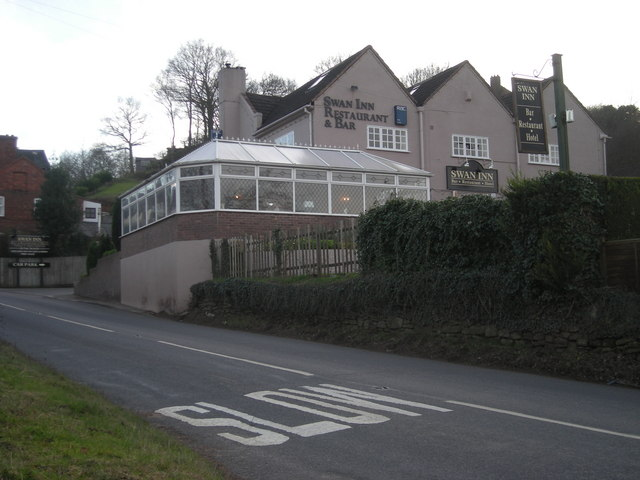
- The Swan Inn, Eardington

- Location within Shropshire
- OS grid reference: SO721905
- Civil parish: Eardington
- Unitary authority: Shropshire
- Ceremonial county: Shropshire
- Region: West Midlands
- Country: England
- Sovereign state: United Kingdom
- Post town: Bridgnorth
- Postcode district: WV16
- Dialling code: 01746
- Police: West Mercia
- Fire: Shropshire
- Ambulance: West Midlands
- UK Parliament: Ludlow
- Website: http://eardington-pc.gov.uk

Eardington is a small village and civil parish in Shropshire, England. It is near the A442 road and is two kilometres south of the town of Bridgnorth, along the B4555 road. The population taken at the 2011 Census is shown under Bridgnorth. The Severn Valley Railway runs immediately to the east of the village and there was once a stop on the line, situated about half a mile to the south, between Upper and Lower Forge, called Eardington Halt.

The half-mile Eardington Forge Canal connected the forges to the River Severn. This was opened in 1782 and closed in 1889 when the forges stopped working.

== Transport ==
There is a bus service through the village, operated by Central Buses. The number 125 bus service operates Mondays to Saturdays, from Bridgnorth to Stourbridge.

== See also ==
- Listed buildings in Eardington
