= Kidderminster railway station =

Railway station in Worcestershire, England

Coordinates: 52.384°N 2.239°W

Kidderminster
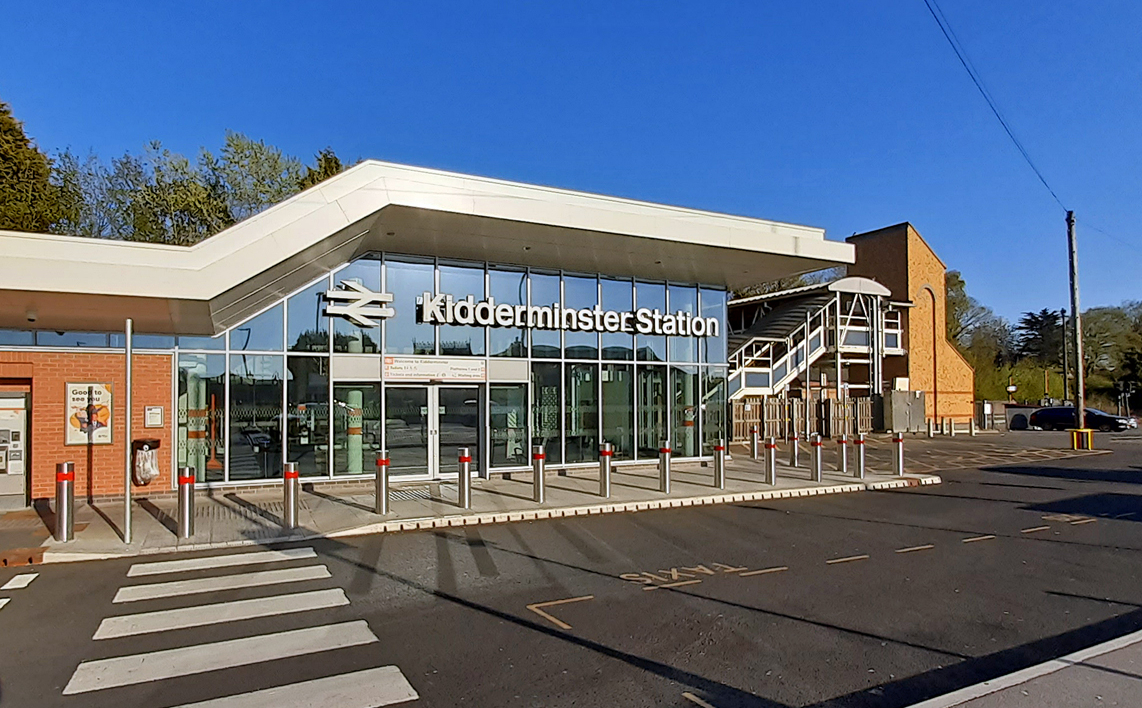
- Station frontage

General information
- Location: Kidderminster, Wyre Forest; England
- Grid reference: SO838763
- Owner: Network Rail
- Manager: West Midlands Trains
- Platforms: 2

Other information
- Station code: KID
- Classification: DfT category D

History
- Opened: 1 May 1852; 174 years ago

Passengers
- 2021/22: ▲0.799 million
- 2022/23: ▲0.916 million
- 2023/24: ▲1.129 million
- 2024/25: ▲1.242 million
- 2025/26: ▲1.348 million
Location
Notes
- Passenger statistics from the Office of Rail & Road

Kidderminster railway station serves the market town of Kidderminster, Worcestershire, England and the wider Wyre Forest district. The station is operated by West Midlands Trains, and is on the Birmingham to Worcester via Kidderminster Line. Regular commuter services run to Birmingham and Worcester. It shares its station approach with the adjacent Severn Valley Railway station.

== History ==
Kidderminster station opened with the extension of the Oxford, Worcester & Wolverhampton Railway from Worcester to Stourbridge on 1 May 1852. It became an important intermediate station on the line which became part of the West Midland Railway in 1860, which in turn amalgamated with the Great Western Railway and the South Wales Railway on 1 August 1863.

The opening of the Severn Valley Railway in 1862 had no direct effect on Kidderminster because the line initially had only a south facing connection to Hartlebury, passengers wishing to use the line had to change there. The situation changed in 1878, when a north-facing connection was opened between Bewdley and Kidderminster, linking Kidderminster directly with the Severn Valley Line.

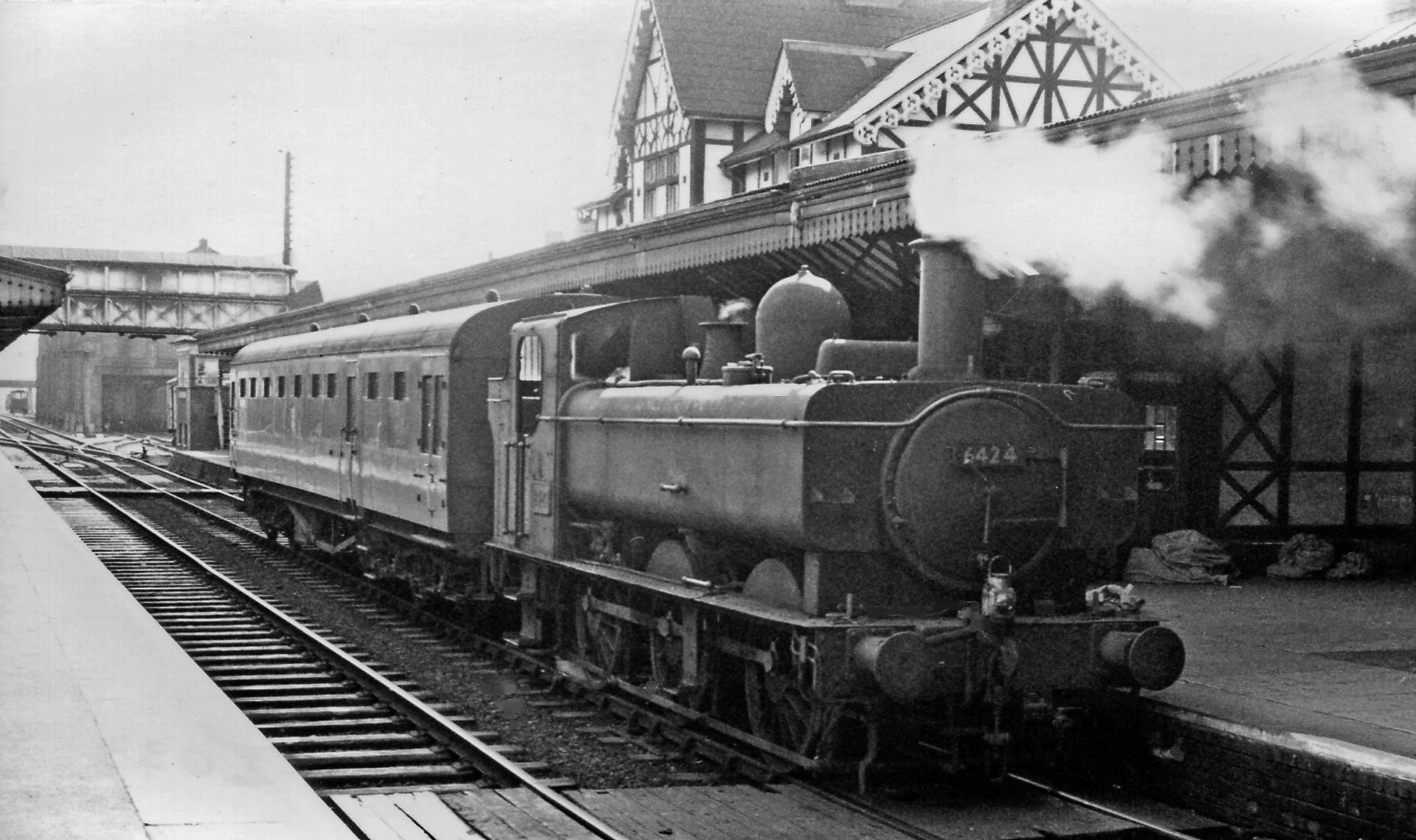
Kidderminster station in 1963, with auto-train to Bewdley.

From about 1900, there was a brisk passenger trade of tourists and day trippers from the West Midlands conurbation.

Due to dwindling passenger numbers, the Severn Valley Line closed to through traffic in 1963. North of Bewdley, the line closed completely in early 1969 when Alveley colliery was shut down and freight traffic ceased.

Passenger services on the Kidderminster, Bewdley and Hartlebury section were withdrawn on 3 January 1970.

The halt of traffic to Stourport power station in 1979, and Kidderminster to Foley Park British Sugar traffic in 1982 saw the end of regular British Rail services off the main line.

The line through the station was closed for nine days in 2026 due to a wildfire next to the track. Services from Birmingham Snow Hill terminated at Stourbridge Junction.

=== Station buildings ===
The earliest station building was replaced by another in 1859. In 1863 the second building was destroyed by fire, and a third station building of a Mock Tudor design was built to replace it. This survived until 1968 when it was demolished owing to the effects of dry rot and replaced by British Rail in 1974 with a small utilitarian brick building.

As passenger numbers grew, this building became inadequate, and funding for a new building was secured in February 2015, with a new £4.3 million design announced in July 2017. Originally due to open in summer 2019, the new glass fronted building, which is twice the size of the previous one, was eventually opened in June 2020.

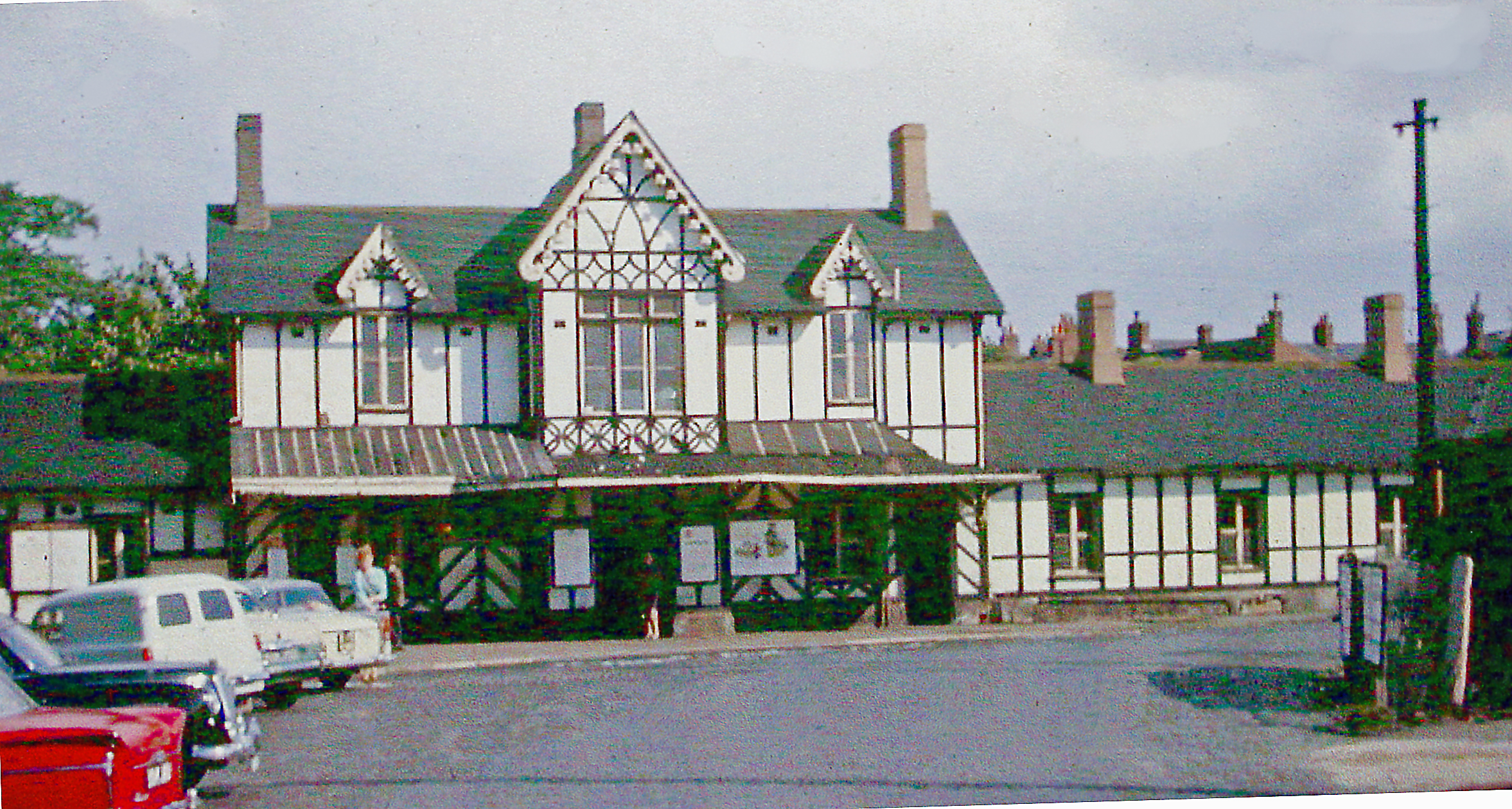
The 1863 Mock Tudor station building, demolished in 1968.

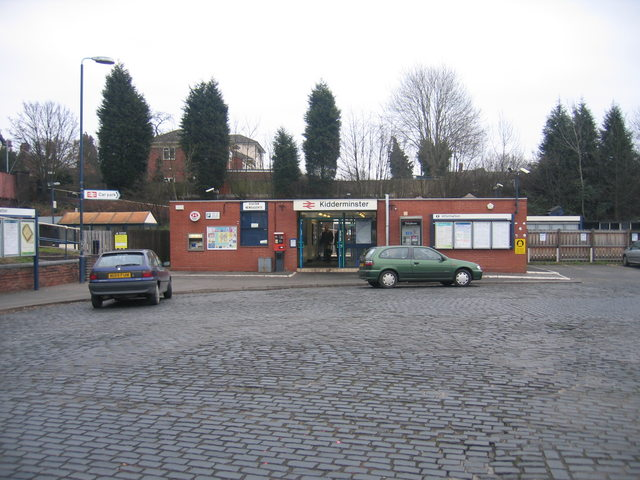
The 1974 brick station building, in 2006.

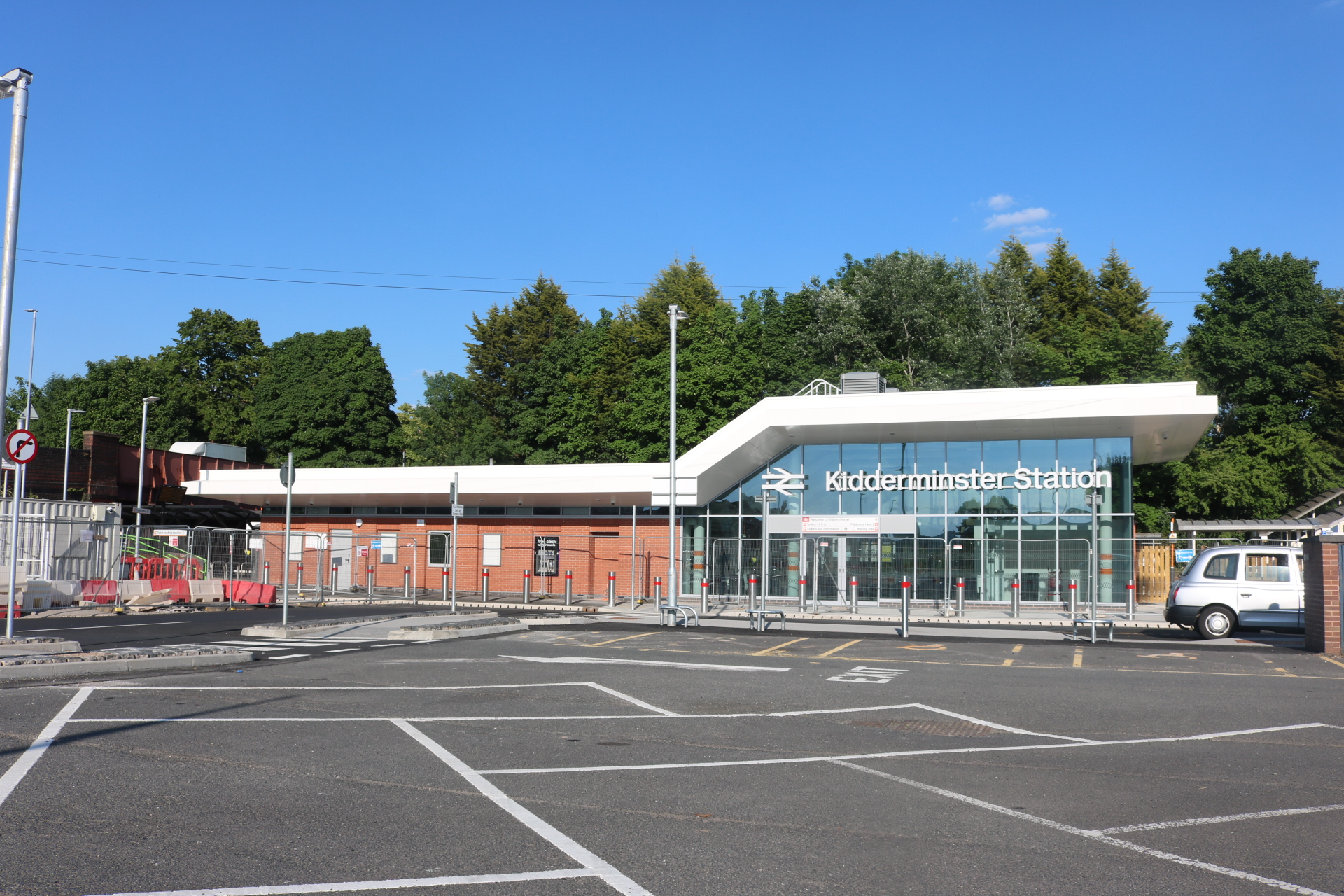
The new glass-fronted station building, opened 2020.

== Facilities ==
There is a large car park for 400 cars, administered by West Midlands Trains, in part of the old goods yard between the two railway stations. The Severn Valley Railway has its own car park on the town centre side of its station.

In 2009, a footbridge (with lifts) was opened, transforming access between the platforms. Before this work, it was via the road overbridge.

Prior to its demolition, the signal box (a short distance to the south of the station) was known as Kidderminster Junction. This controlled the junction to the Severn Valley Line until its closure in the 1970s.

=== Severn Valley Railway terminus ===
The Severn Valley Railway's southern terminus shares the same station approach road and is known as Kidderminster Town to distinguish it from the National Rail station. This also reflects the Great Western Railway tradition of suffixing the station name with "Town" if it was closer to the main body of the town served than that of its competitor(s), which Kidderminster Town achieves to the tune of around 60 yards.

== Services ==
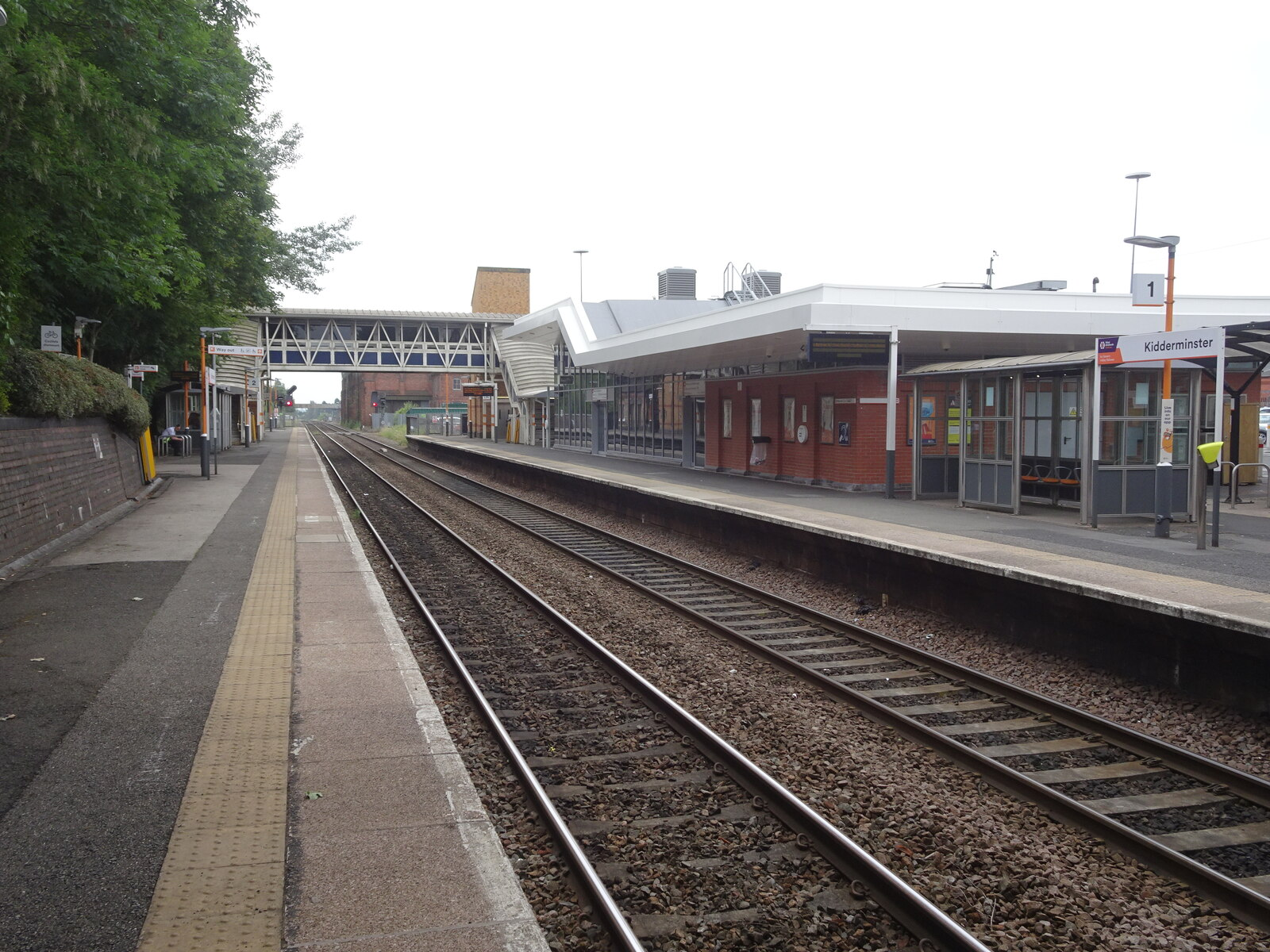
Station platforms.

All trains using the station are operated by West Midlands Railway as part of the Snow Hill Lines.

The standard off peak service in trains per hour (tph) is:

- 4 tph to Birmingham Snow Hill and Birmingham Moor Street, semi fast, of which 2 continue to Stratford-upon-Avon, 1 to Dorridge and 1 to Whitlocks End;
- 2 tph to Worcester (either Foregate Street or Shrub Hill).

From September 2002 until May 2023, Chiltern Railways peak-hour services to and from London Marylebone terminated at Kidderminster.

Preceding station	National Rail	Following station
Hagley or Blakedown	West Midlands Railway; Stratford-Birmingham-Kidderminster-Worcester; Snow Hill Lines	Hartlebury or Droitwich Spa
Hagley or Blakedown	West Midlands Railway; Leamington-Worcester	Hartlebury or Droitwich Spa
Heritage railways
Change for the Severn Valley Railway at Kidderminster Town

== Bibliography ==
- Mitchell, Vic; Smith, Keith (2007). Kidderminster to Shrewsbury. Middleton Press. figs. 11-22. ISBN 9781906008109. OCLC 154801530.
- Mitchell, Vic; Smith, Keith (2007). Worcester to Birmingham. Middleton Press. figs. 29-41. ISBN 9781904474975. OCLC 263292710.
