= Crossway Green =

Village in Worcestershire, England

Coordinates: 52.314457°N 2.235332°W

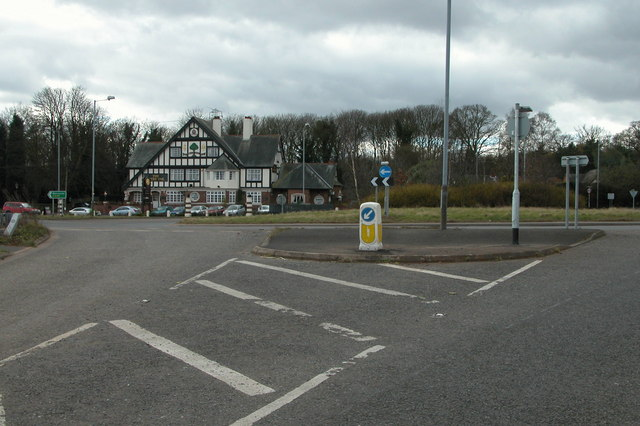
- The Mitre Oak

- Location within Worcestershire
- District: Wychavon
- Shire county: Worcestershire
- Region: West Midlands
- Country: England
- Sovereign state: United Kingdom
- Post town: Stourport-on-Severn
- Postcode district: DY13
- Police: West Mercia
- Fire: Hereford and Worcester
- Ambulance: West Midlands

Crossway Green, Worcestershire, England is a village, located south of Kidderminster, Worcestershire as well as Hartlebury, Worcestershire.
