= Bridgnorth railway station =

Station in Shropshire, England

Bridgnorth
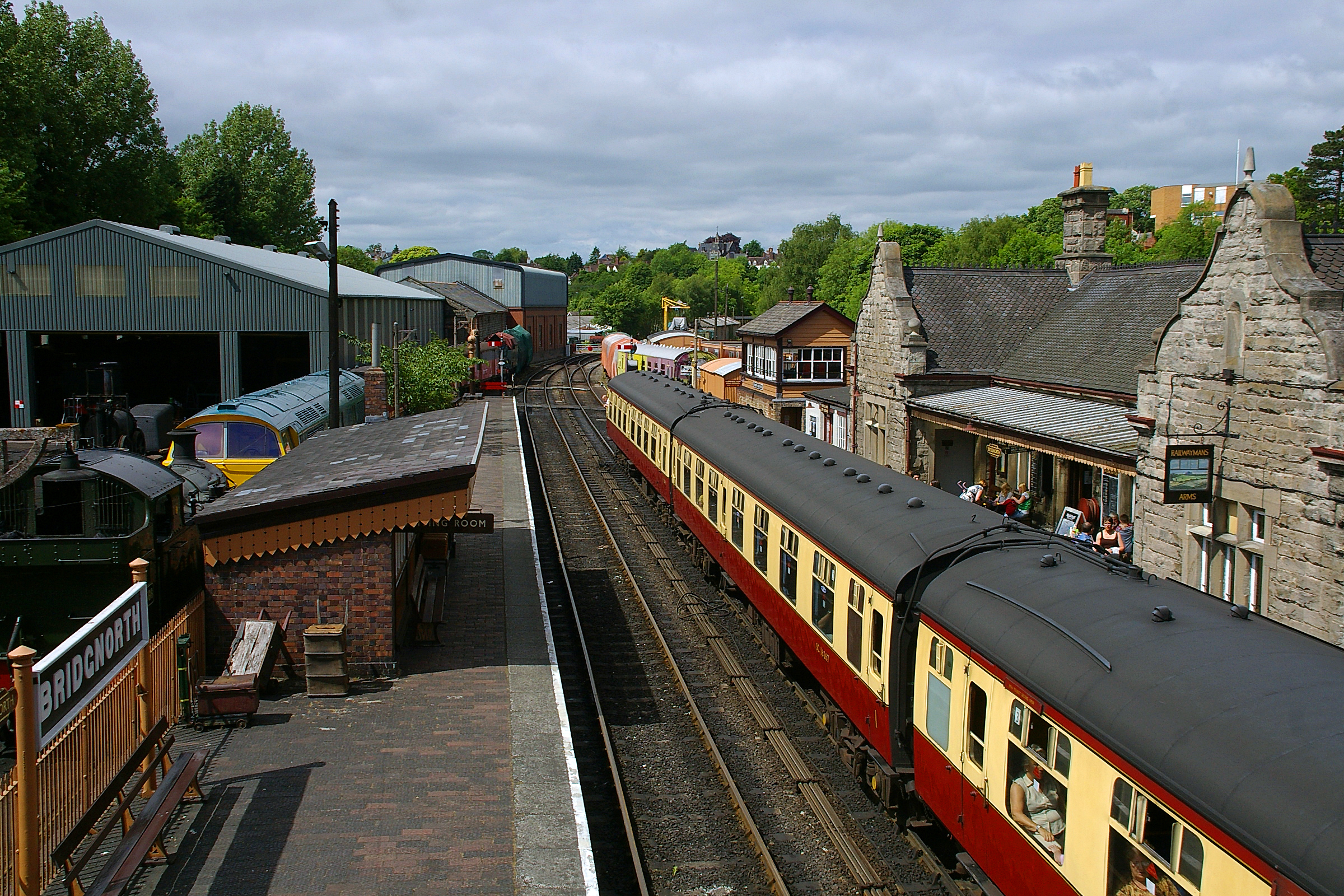

General information
- Location: Bridgnorth, Shropshire; England
- Coordinates: 52.5305°N 2.4208°W
- Grid reference: SO715926
- System: Station on heritage railway
- Operator: Severn Valley Railway
- Platforms: 2

History
- Original company: Severn Valley Railway
- Pre-grouping: Great Western Railway
- Post-grouping: Great Western Railway

Key dates
- 1 February 1862: Station opened
- 9 September 1963: Closed
- 23 May 1970: Reopened as preserved station 2016
Location

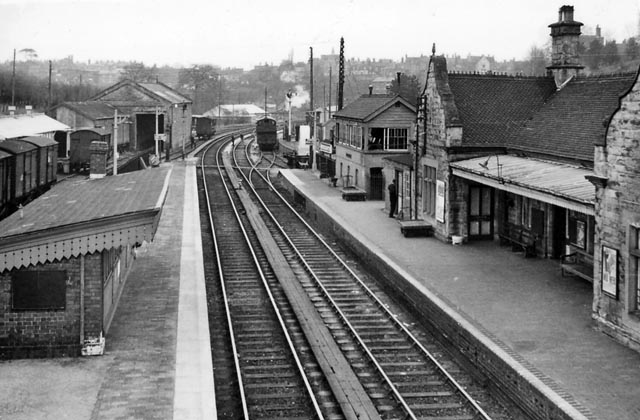
The station in 1962

Bridgnorth railway station is a station on the Severn Valley Railway heritage line, serving the Shropshire town of Bridgnorth, England. It is currently the northern terminus of the SVR, home to the main engine shed and has a gift shop, station buffet and licensed refreshment room amongst other facilities.

== History ==
Bridgnorth station was not the northern terminus when built, but the main intermediate station of the Severn Valley line being 18 1/4 miles from Hartlebury and 22 1/2 miles from Shrewsbury. Bridgnorth station was opened to the public on 1 February 1862, prompting great celebrations in the town. Originally under SVR Company ownership, it was passed to Great Western Railway (GWR), and eventually British Railways in 1948. It closed to passengers after 101 years on 9 September 1963, and to freight traffic on 30 November 1963.

The neo-Jacobean station is the only listed station on the Severn Valley Railway and is in process of restoration work by a team of dedicated volunteers.

The licensed refreshment room, these days known as The Railwaymans Arms, is situated on platform 1. It opened in 1861 and never closed, being extended twice by the SVR, and now needing further extension due to its unique character and popularity.

=== Stationmasters ===
The first station master, William Doughty was convicted by Bridgnorth County Magistrates of an assault on Mr. C.H. Witherington, schoolmaster, cutting his lip and knocking out a tooth. He was fined £5 (equivalent to £515 in 2025) and costs.

- William Doughty 1863–1866
- Samuel Martin 1866 – 1872 (formerly station master at Weymouth, afterwards station master at Westbury)
- Frederick Corran Barrett from 1874 (formerly station master at Abergavenny)
- William G. Bowerman 1879–1897
- John Samuel Collett 1897–1905
- William James Cowan 1905 – ca. 1911
- George Smith 1914–1928 (formerly station master at Chipping Norton)
- D.B. Davis 1930–1940 (formerly station master at Chipping Norton)
- George Noble from 1940
- W.L. Mann 1952–1960 (afterwards station master at Redditch)
- H.E. Ray from 1960 (formerly station master at Bewdley)

== Preservation ==
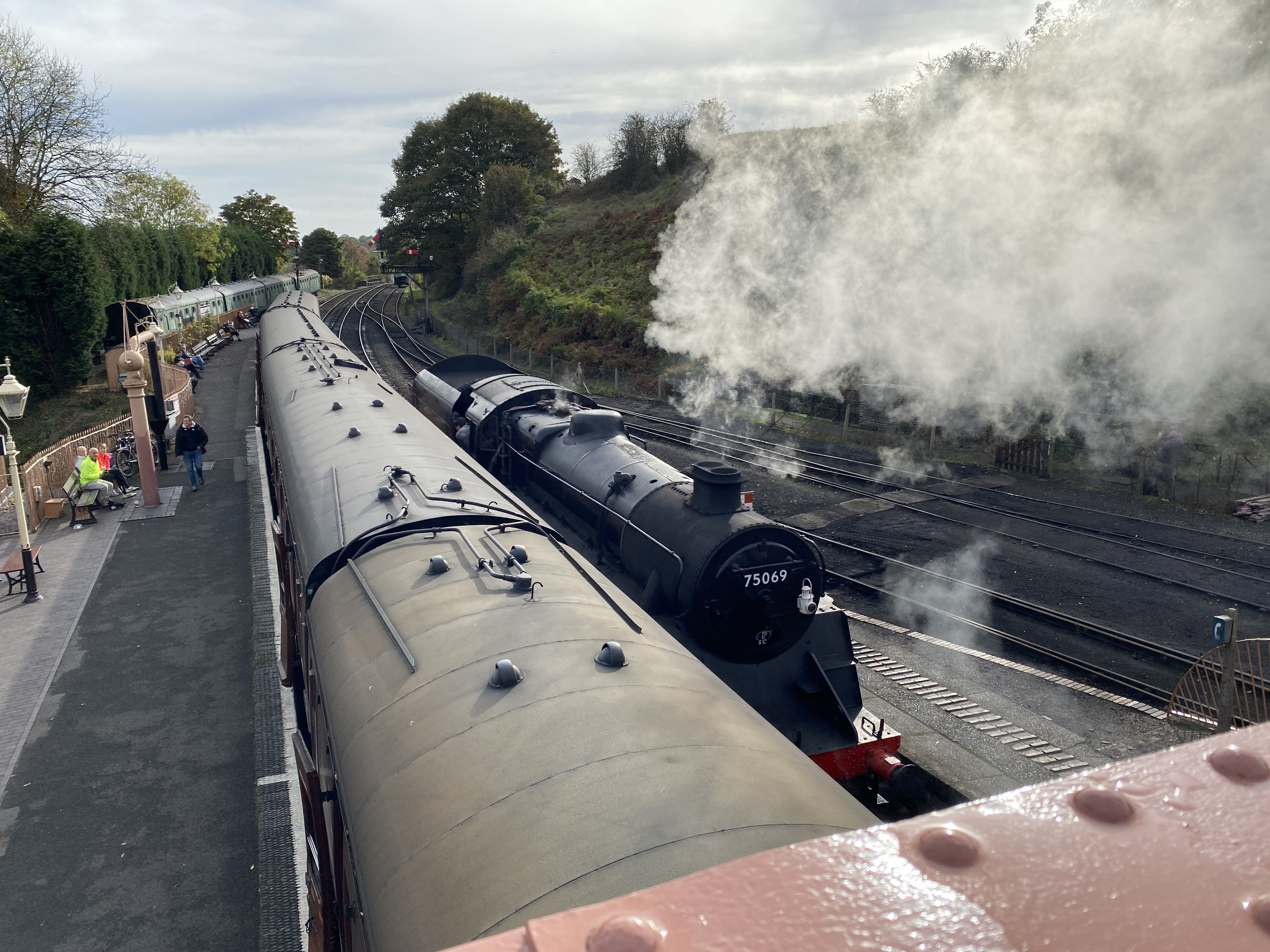
The opposite end of Bridgnorth facing south, October 2022.

After only two years of closure preservationists had plans for Bridgnorth, resulting in the formation of the Severn Valley Railway Society. Vegetation was cleared, railway bric-a-brac was collected and the station buildings were refurbished. Although the original signal box was substantially demolished (only three sides of the bottom brick part and interlocking are original, the brick base was originally somewhat longer), Bridgnorth station was never damaged through this demolition activity. From then on preservation gained momentum until the present day. Bridgnorth became the engineering centre of the new SVR because of the need to repair the growing numbers of rolling stock items and locomotives after opening to the public when the first train steamed from Bridgnorth to Hampton Loade in May 1970.

Sir Gerald Nabarro, chairman of the revived SVR, planned to sell the Bridgnorth station site for hotel and housing development; when SVR volunteers discovered his plans, it led to a threatened strike by the railway's volunteer staff and his proposals were thrown out at a heated AGM in 1973, following which he resigned his chairmanship.

The station is reached from High Town via a modern footbridge over a main road and a valley, the present bridge having opened in 1994. This replacement tubular steel bridge occupies the site of a lattice bridge closed and demolished several years previously. A section of the original footbridge adorns the centre island of one of the road traffic roundabouts.

Plans for a significant redevelopment of Bridgnorth station were approved by Shropshire Council in August 2016. The first phase of the project involving the construction of a new single-storey building in GWR circa 1900-style to provide a tea/refreshment room and new toilet facilities was completed at the end of 2018, as was the creation of an additional car park. Further phases will include the installation of a turntable in the locomotive yard and the renovation of the existing station building housing the booking hall, station shop and Railwayman's Arms public house. Additional funding will be required in due course for the construction of a new volunteer accommodation building.

== Locomotive works ==
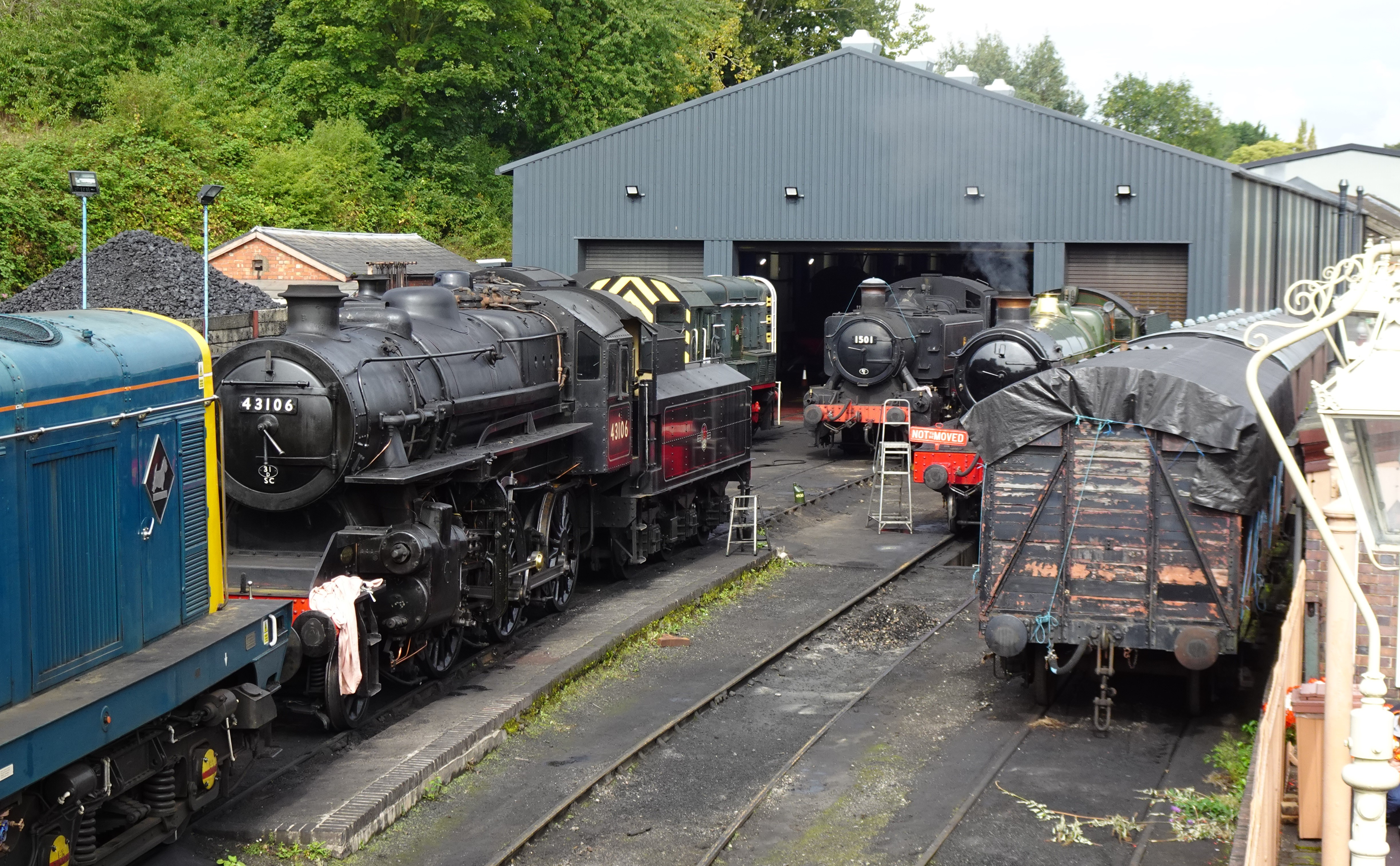
The Shed from the outside in August 2023.

The main locomotive works for the SVR are located at Bridgnorth. They are not normally open to the public because of health and safety regulations but conducted tours and open days are arranged from time to time. Major features of the locomotive works include the Boiler Shop, the machine shop equipped with a Noble and Lund wheel lathe and ex-LT lifting jacks along with other equipment in the general fitting area.

Installation of a locomotive wheel drop that was recovered from Leicestershire was completed during 2010.

== See also ==
- Bridgnorth Cliff Railway

Preceding station	Heritage railways	Following station
Terminus	Severn Valley Railway	Eardington Halt towards Kidderminster Town
Disused railways
Linley Halt; Line and station closed	Great Western Railway; Severn Valley Railway	Eardington Halt; Line and station open
