= Hartlebury railway station =

Railway station in Worcestershire, England

Coordinates: 52.334°N 2.221°W

Hartlebury
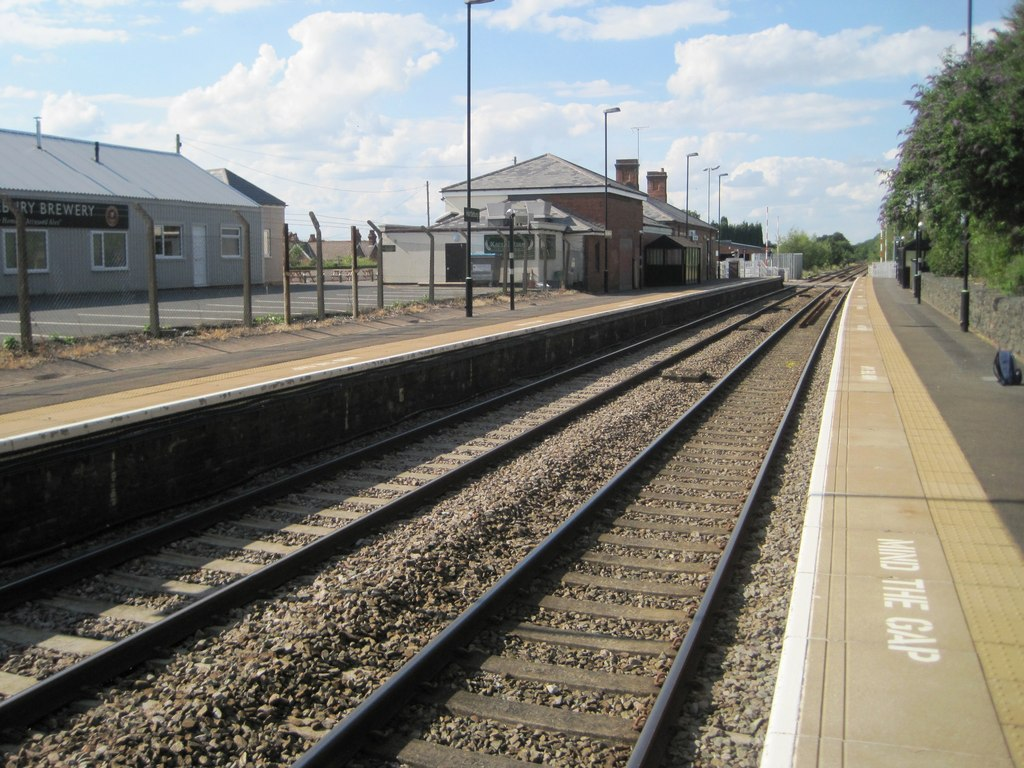

General information
- Location: Hartlebury, Wychavon; England
- Grid reference: SO850707
- Manager: West Midlands Trains
- Platforms: 2

Other information
- Station code: HBY
- Classification: DfT category F2

Passengers
- 2021/22: ▲38,002
- 2022/23: ▲44,184
- 2023/24: ▲50,794
- 2024/25: ▲66,184
- 2025/26: ▲81,058
Location
Notes
- Passenger statistics from the Office of Rail and Road

Hartlebury railway station serves the village of Hartlebury in Worcestershire, England. All trains serving the station are operated by West Midlands Trains. The station is unstaffed and is about half a mile to the east of the village.

== Details and history ==
Hartlebury station was opened by the Oxford, Worcester and Wolverhampton Railway in 1852, and from 1862 it served as the starting point of the Severn Valley Railway, which ran to Shrewsbury in Shropshire, a distance of 40 miles. Through passenger trains over this route ended in September 1963, but local workings to Stourport-on-Severn & Bewdley continued until January 1970 and coal trains to the power station at Stourport until 1979. The branch has since been lifted, though its formation can still be seen.

The original station had an overbridge and canopies but these were removed in the 1960s, during a period of rationalisation on the railways, and crossing the platforms must now be done via the road. As the old station building is now a pub/restaurant, waiting passengers are provided with bus shelter-style structures to shelter from the elements. Due to the station having short platforms longer trains cannot stop here.

After being used by a marine engineering company, the old station building is currently being redeveloped as a micro-brewery, pub and restaurant.

There is a level crossing at the north end of the station, formerly operated by Hartlebury Station Box (to the north of the crossing) but now worked remotely from the West Midlands Signalling Centre at Saltley.

Hartlebury Station Box was an example of the second signal box design from McKenzie & Holland of Worcester, and became operational in 1876. A further signal box, Hartlebury Junction, previously existed at the junction of the Severn Valley line, but was demolished after the closure of the line rendered the box redundant.

== Services ==
Up until the December 2013 timetable change the service from the station to both Birmingham and Worcester was limited, especially outside of the morning and evening peak periods. From 9 December 2013 however, the station gained an hourly service in each direction between 06:40 and 20:07 Mondays to Saturdays. A few additional later evening trains also called at Hartlebury after this time. Most eastbound trains run beyond Birmingham Snow Hill to Dorridge, whilst westbound trains switch between the two main stations in Worcester at different times of day.

A two hourly Sunday service was introduced in May 2022, with three trains towards Birmingham extending to Stratford-upon-Avon.

In the May 2023 timetable, an hourly service to operates eastbound to Dorridge via Kidderminster, Smethwick Galton Bridge, Snow Hill and Solihull. Most westbound trains run to Worcester Foregate Street via Droitwich Spa, but some go Worcester Shrub Hill. There is one train a day to Leamington Spa on Monday to Saturday evenings.

A normal weekday service operates on most bank holidays.

Preceding station	National Rail	Following station
Kidderminster	West Midlands Railway; Birmingham to Worcester via Kidderminster Line	Droitwich Spa
	Disused railways	
Stourport-on-Severn; Line and station closed	Great Western Railway; Severn Valley Railway	Terminus
