= Kidderminster Town railway station =

Railway station in Kidderminster, England

Coordinates: 52.38426°N 2.24003°W

Kidderminster Town
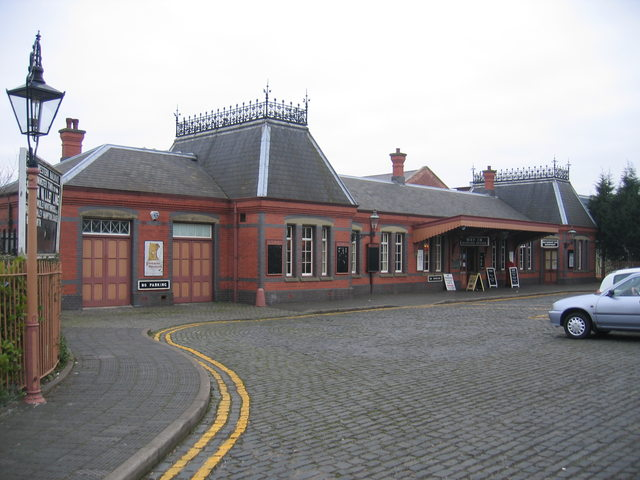
- Station frontage

General information
- Location: Kidderminster, Wyre Forest; England
- Grid reference: SO837762
- System: Station on heritage railway
- Manager: Severn Valley Railway
- Platforms: 2

History
- Opened: 1984
Location

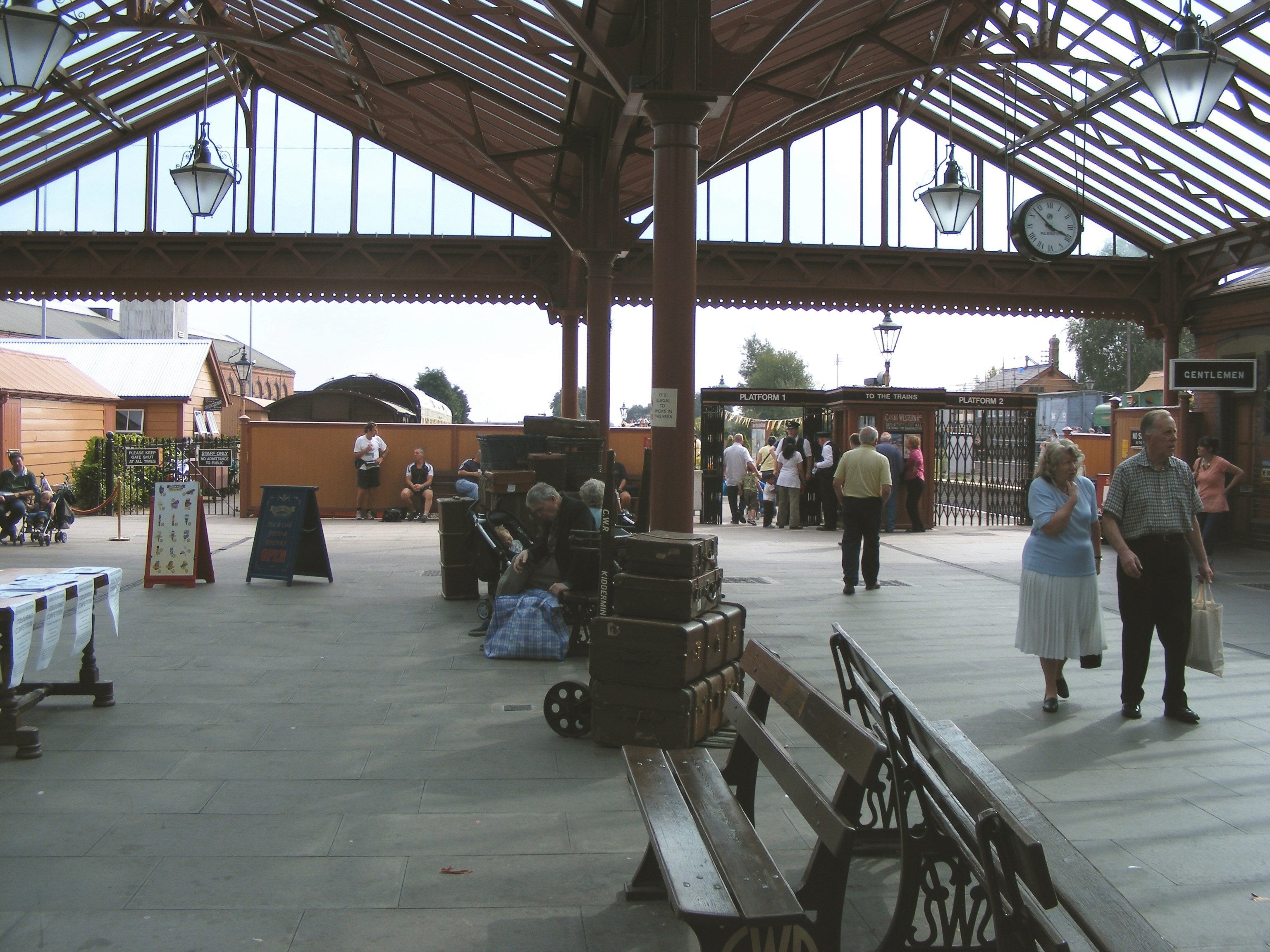
Inside the station concourse

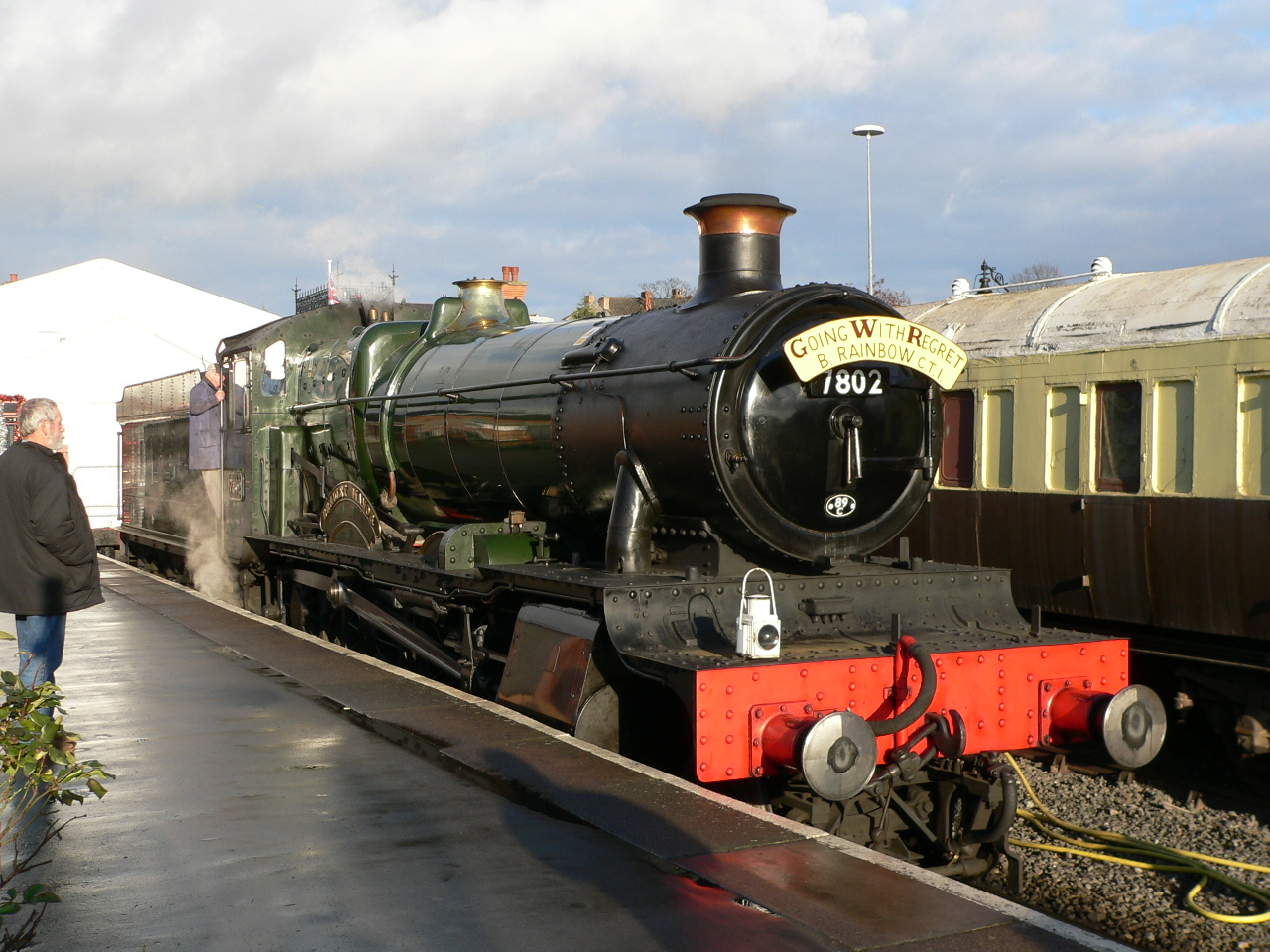
GWR 7800 Class 4-6-0 "Bradley Manor"

Kidderminster Town is a railway station situated in the town of Kidderminster, Worcestershire, England. It is operated by the Severn Valley Railway, a heritage line which runs from Kidderminster to Bridgnorth. The station was opened on 30 July 1984, was built in a late Victorian style, and shares its station approach and car park with the adjacent National Rail station.

== History ==
The first railway station at Kidderminster was opened by the Oxford, Worcester and Wolverhampton Railway (OW&WR) in 1852. It became an important intermediate station on the line which became part of the West Midland Railway in 1860. In turn, the WMR was absorbed intro the Great Western Railway (GWR) between 1863 and 1870.

The opening of the Severn Valley Railway in 1862 had no direct effect on Kidderminster because passengers wishing to use the line changed at Hartlebury.

The situation changed in 1878, when a "loop-line" was opened between Bewdley and Kidderminster, linking Kidderminster with the Severn Valley Line. However, despite this most trains using the line ran through Bewdley, and then the Wyre Forest line to Tenbury Wells or Woofferton.

From about 1900, there was a brisk passenger trade of tourists and day trippers from the West Midlands conurbation.

Due to dwindling passenger numbers, the Severn Valley Line closed to through traffic in 1963. North of Bewdley, the line closed completely in early 1969 when Alveley colliery was shut down and freight traffic ceased.

Passenger services on the Kidderminster, Bewdley and Hartlebury section clung on until 1970.

The halt of traffic to Stourport power station in 1979, and Kidderminster - Foley Park British Sugar Corporation traffic in 1982 saw the end of regular British Rail services off the main line.

== Preservation ==
With the exception of Country Park halt, Kidderminster is, by far, the youngest of the SVR stations. Bridgnorth to Bewdley passenger services started in 1974, and it was decided to extend the line to Kidderminster to attract more custom from the bustling town close to the West Midlands conurbation. After Kidderminster goods yard became disused in 1982, the SVR purchased the line to the east of Foley Park. Sharing the British Rail station of Kidderminster was impractical, so SVR claimed a site to the west of the BR station. Initially, the site was leased from BR until privatisation when BR looked to sell off the site, leading to the 1994 SVR share issue to raise capital to buy it outright.

Kidderminster Town lies only a few yards from Kidderminster station on the National Rail network. The name "Kidderminster Town" was chosen due to GWR custom, where there were two stations in a town, was to give the "Town" designation to the closer one to the town centre, a measure by which Kidderminster Town just manages to beat its National Rail counterpart by around 50 metres (150 feet).

When the station building was constructed insufficient funds meant only two wings of the basic building could be completed. Many of the typical Victorian GWR station fixtures and fittings also had to be omitted. The building design was based on the GWR Ross-on-Wye station building which opened in 1890.

Since then a number of these missing features have been constructed and erected by volunteers including a cantilevered canopy in the 1880s Porte Cochere style at the front of the building and the replica ornamental crestings adorning the two towers.

The original iron crestings of this style are thought to have been cast by Walter Macfarlane & Co. at the Saracen Foundry, Possilpark, Glasgow. At the architect's request the replicas have been cast in aluminium to reduce the deadweight on the tower structures. To prevent corrosion due to electrolytic action all fixings to the roof structure have been electrically isolated from the aluminium castings with plastic washers etc. Examples of identical original cast iron crestings may be seen adorning Slough railway station, Wrexham General railway station and the HSBC Bank in Derby city centre.

The missing wing was completed in 2006, together with a canopy covering the station concourse. The design of the steelwork for this canopy has been closely based on the former GWR station at Wolverhampton Low Level.

In 2000, the carriage shed was constructed within the site. A fifth of a mile long, it is the UK's largest on a heritage railway with a capacity of circa 56 bogie vehicles.

The former GWR Warehouse is now occupied by Kidderminster Railway Museum, an independent charity which works closely with the SVR. The entrance to the 7 1/4 in (184 mm) gauge Coalyard Miniature Railway is located next to the museum.

In the Spring of 2012, it was a filming location of the fantasy adventure movie Mariah Mundi and the Midas Box, which was scheduled for release in 2013.

In May 2026, an extension to the platforms was opened. The extension included extending the length of the platforms and repositioning the track alignment on platform 2 alongside positioning the former Radyr bracket signal. In June 2026, it was announced that a canopy expected to cost £1 million pounds was to be built at Kidderminster Town station with work hoped to start in autumn.

== Signalling ==
In common with other SVR stations Kidderminster Town is comprehensively signalled. The Signal Box reuses the sign from the former Kidderminster Station Signal Box whilst the lever frame is from Acton Yard. Most lines under the signal box's control are track circuited, the notable exception is No. 1 engine line. The line between Kidderminster and Bewdley South is worked by acceptance lever, thus avoiding the need for physical tokens. Recent work has seen completion of the work to link Network Rail (NR) signalling system to that of the SVR to allow passage of passenger carrying trains directly from NR to the SVR. Previously passenger carrying trains could only pass from SVR metals to that of NR.

== Gallery ==
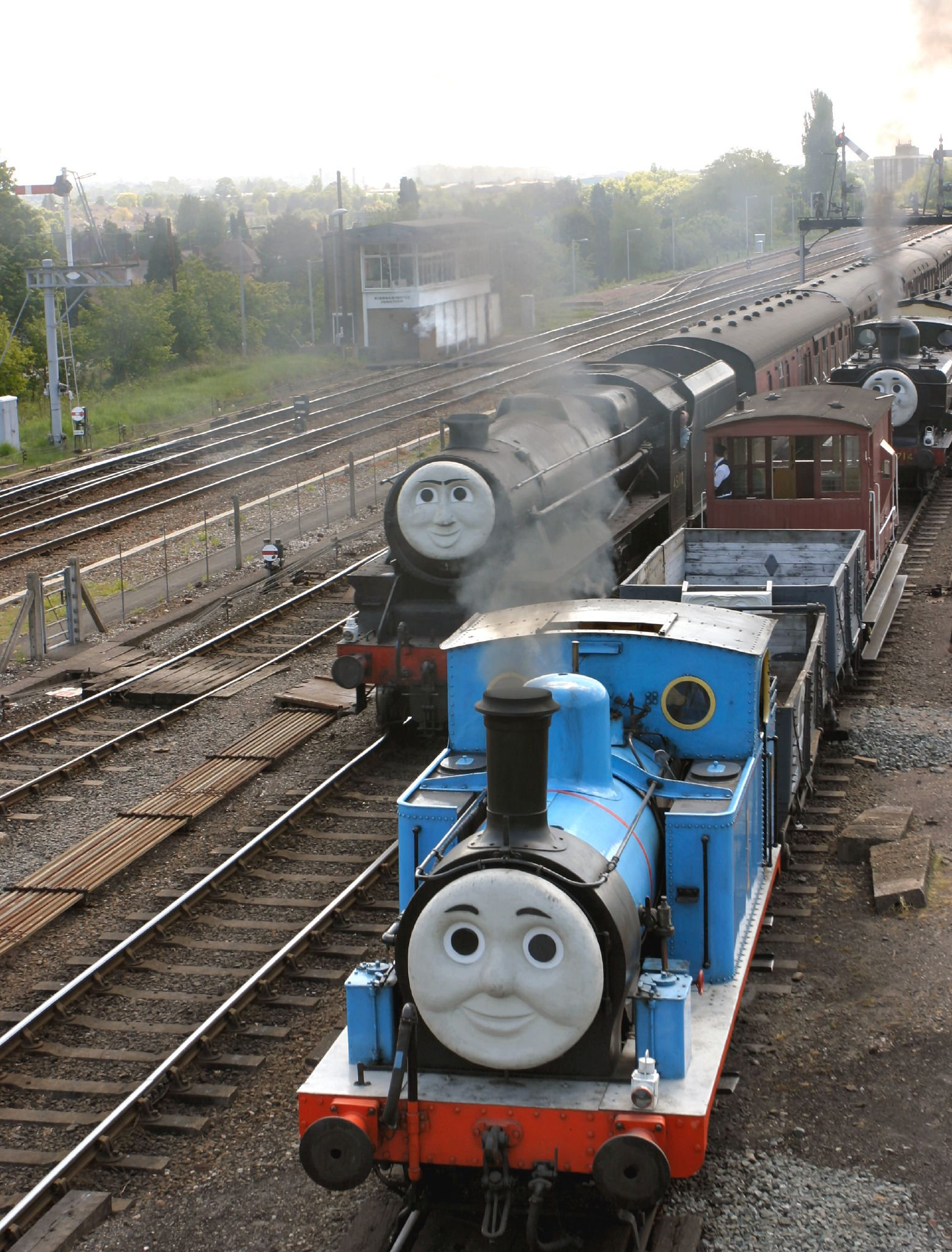
Thomas the Tank Engine trains at Kidderminster

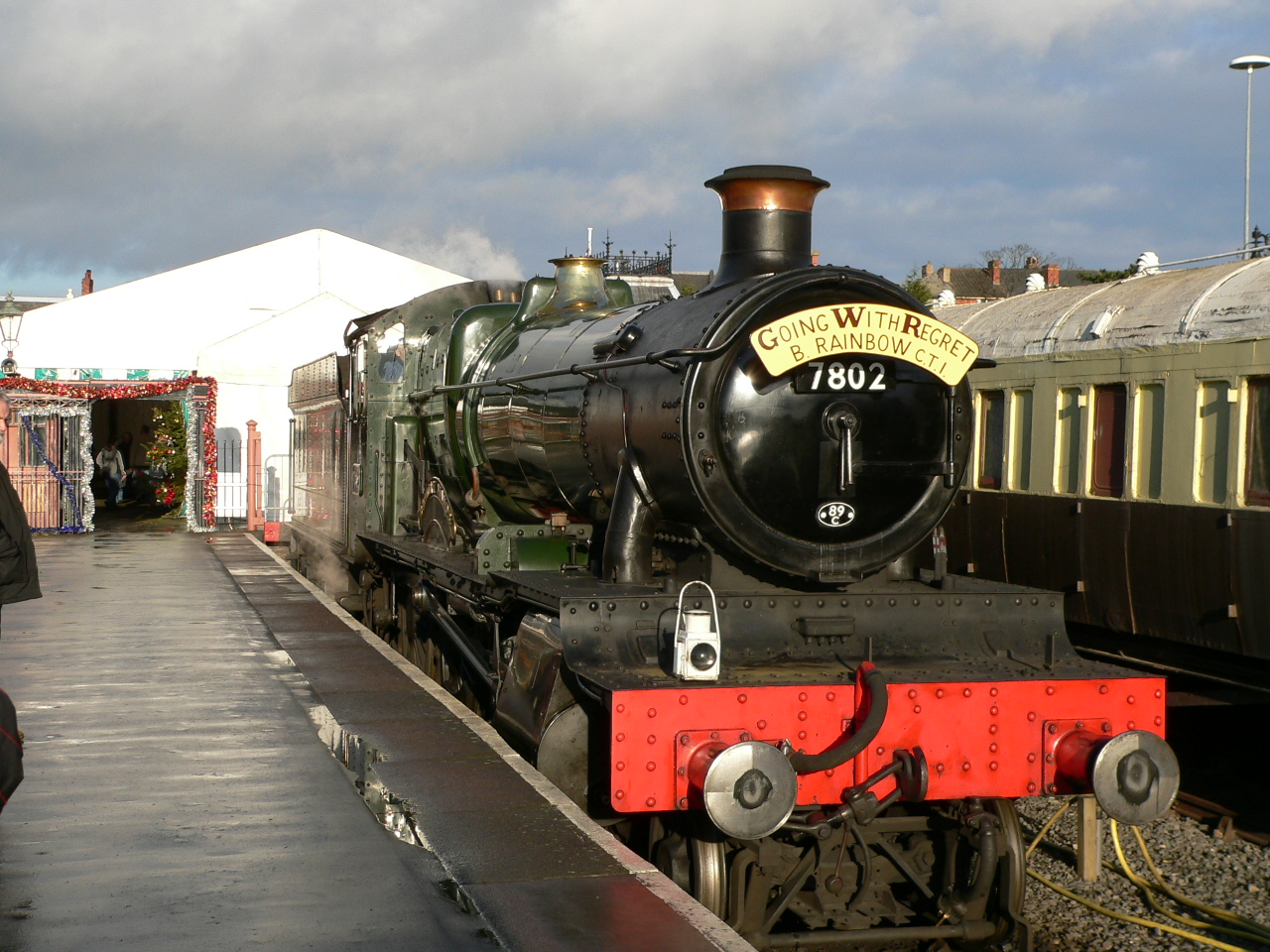
GWR 7800 Class 4-6-0 Bradley Manor

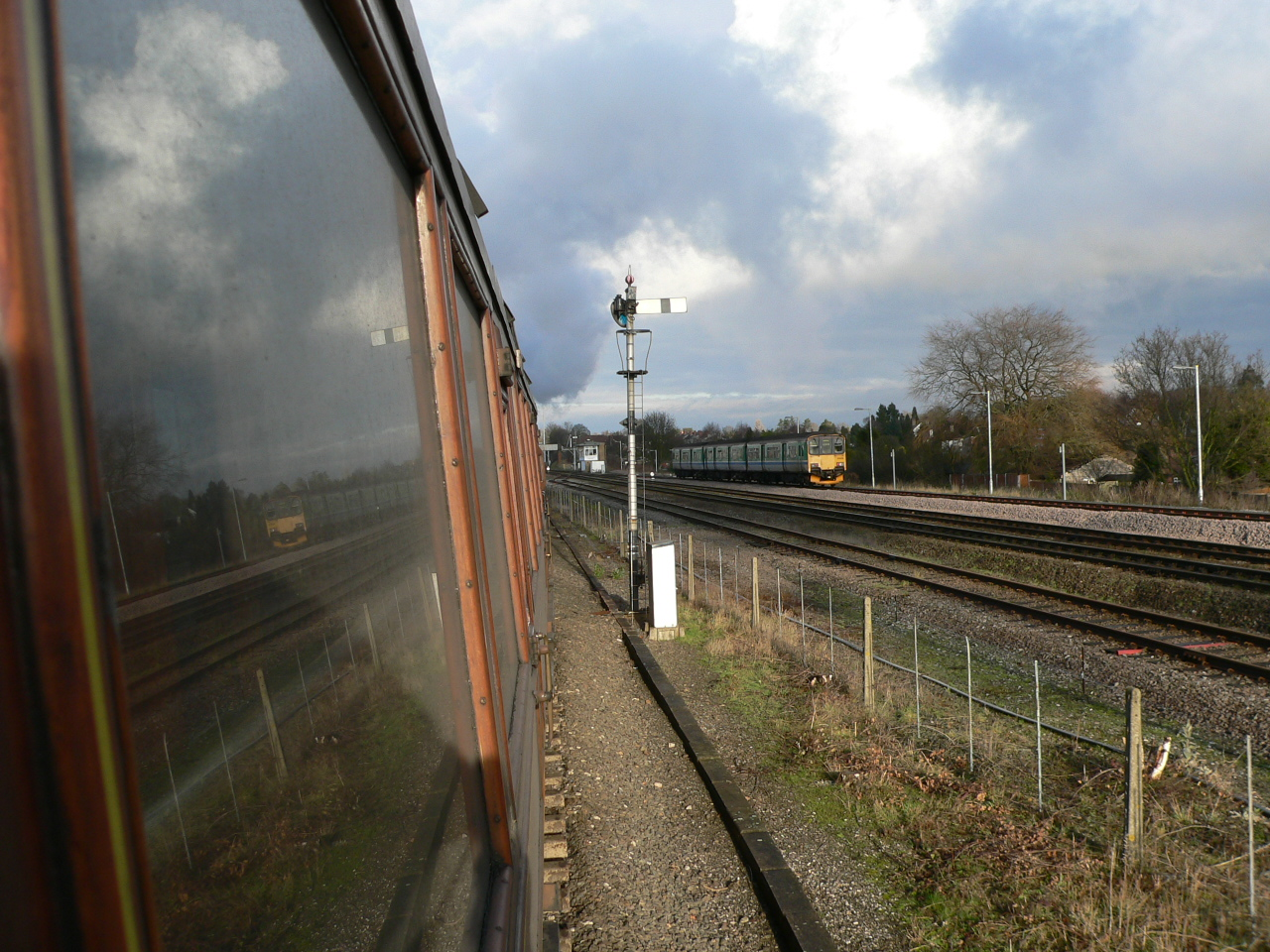
British Rail Class 150 passes on the parallel main line at Kidderminster.

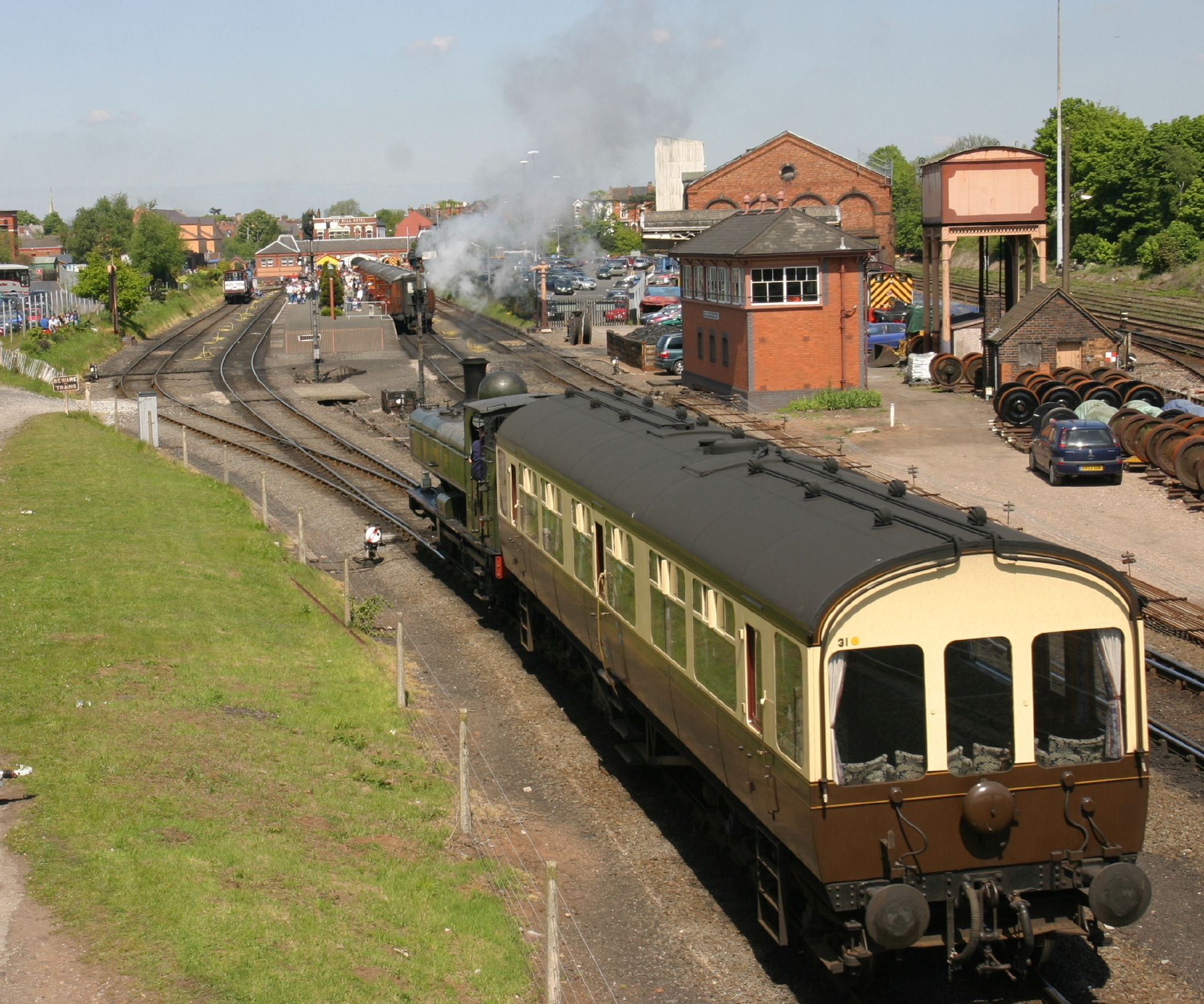
GWR 5700 Class approaching Kidderminster

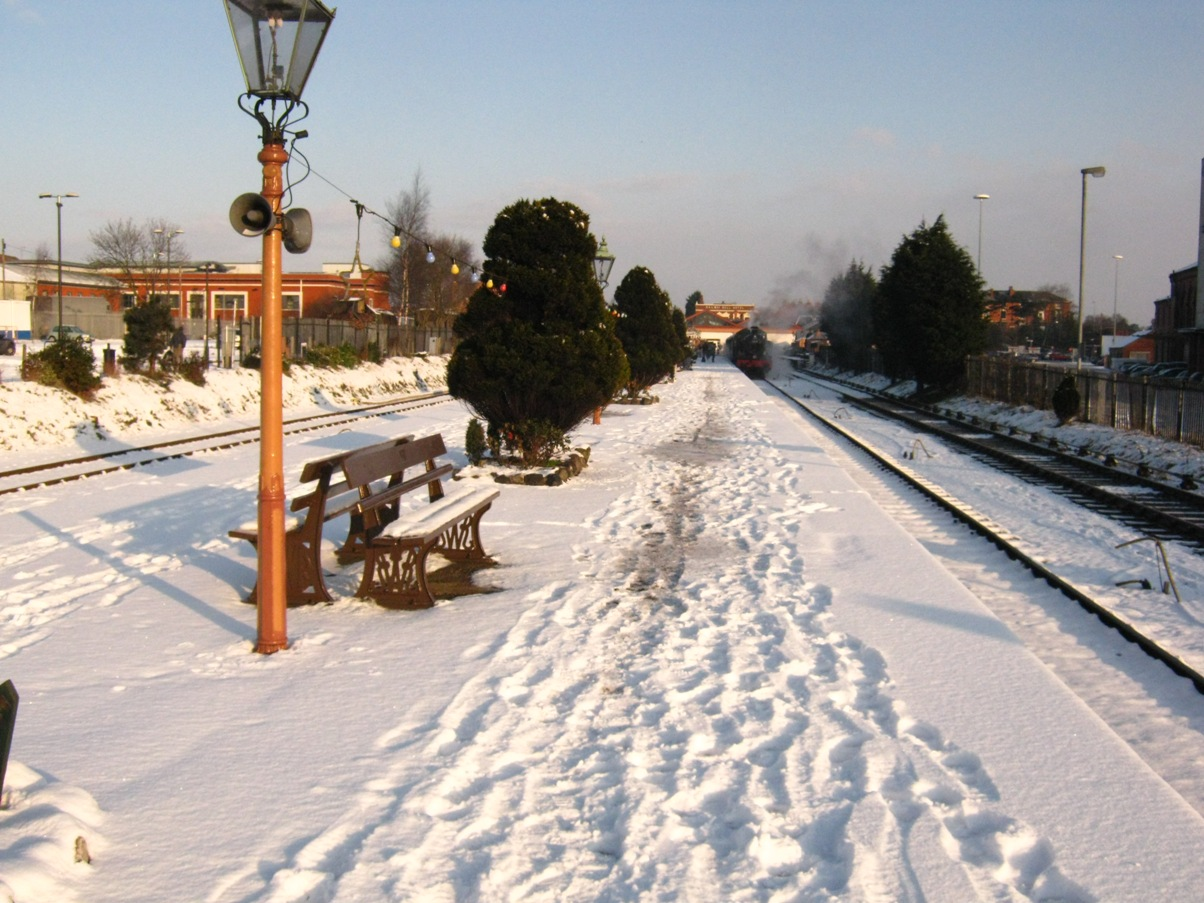
Kidderminster Town in the snow.

Preceding station	Heritage railways	Following station
Bewdley towards Bridgnorth	Severn Valley Railway	Terminus
National Rail
Interchange with Kidderminster on the Birmingham to Worcester via Kidderminster line
