= Bewdley railway station =

Station in Worcestershire, England

Coordinates: 52°22′31″N 2°18′22″W

Bewdley
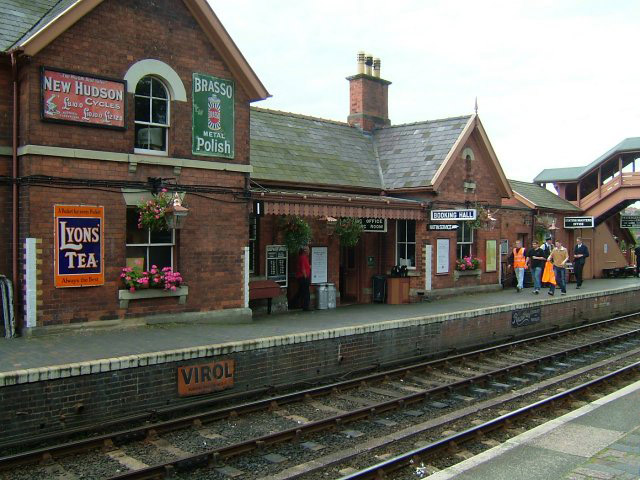

General information
- Location: Bewdley, Wyre Forest; England
- Grid reference: SO791753
- System: Station on heritage railway
- Manager: Severn Valley Railway
- Platforms: 3

Other information
- Station code: BEW
Location

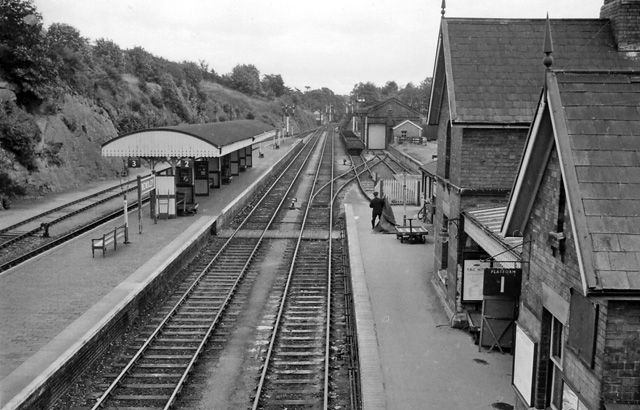
Bewdley Station in 1963 looking south

Bewdley railway station serves the town of Bewdley in Worcestershire, England. Until 2014, it was the administrative headquarters of the Severn Valley Railway, after which they were moved to Comberton Hill, Kidderminster. Bewdley is the principal intermediate station on the line.

== History ==
Bewdley station originally opened in 1862 as one of the main intermediate stations on the 40 3/4-mile (65.6 km) line between Hartlebury and Shrewsbury. It was operated by the West Midland Railway, before that company was absorbed into the Great Western Railway (GWR).

The Tenbury & Bewdley Railway opened in 1864, with its route through the Wyre Forest branching off the SVR 1 mile (1.6 km) north of Bewdley station, before crossing the River Severn over the now partially-dismantled Dowles Bridge. Thus, Bewdley became a junction station.

The GWR opened a "loop-line" to the original Kidderminster railway station in 1878, as this was before the SVR built their Kidderminster Town railway station in 1974, which meant that Bewdley had a direct link with the town and became a double junction. As a legacy of its former junction status, Bewdley station is unique on the SVR in that it has two signal boxes, Bewdley North and Bewdley South.

Bewdley station was at its busiest at weekends and local holiday periods, but traffic declined with the increasing use of cars in the 1950s. As a consequence, rationalisation resulted in the end of through passenger traffic — firstly on the Wyre Forest line in 1962, followed by the Severn Valley line in 1963. Although thought by some to have been a result of the Beeching Axe, those closures pre-dated Beeching's report.

Until January 1970, British Rail continued to serve the last remaining stations of Stourport-on-Severn, Burlish Halt, Bewdley, Foley Park Halt and Kidderminster.

=== Stationmasters ===
- Thomas Appleton 1862 – 1897
- George Smith 1898 – 1909 (afterward station master at Chipping Norton)
- Frederick Hallett 1909 – 1914
- Alfred W. Cooke 1923 – 1937 (formerly station master at Cleobury Mortimer)
- E.T. Rose 1939 – 1942 (afterward station master at Broadway)
- William H. Needle until 1956 (afterward station master at Totnes)
- H.E. Ray 1956 – 1960 (afterward station master at Bridgnorth)

== Preservation ==
Bewdley was disused for only four years before preservationists from the new SVR Company bought the land, track and buildings in 1974, enabling the SVR to extend from Bridgnorth–Hampton Loade to Highley and eventually Bewdley that same year.

From 1980 onwards, occasional bank holiday services were operated to Bewdley, originally from Kidderminster and later from Birmingham New Street. The SVR's own services to/from Kidderminster could not commence until sugar beet traffic to Foley Park ceased in 1982, and its own station, Kidderminster Town, was opened, which occurred two years later.

During and after preservation:

- The station clock on platforms 2 and 3 was brought from Stourbridge Junction railway station.
- The longer valancing pieces on the east side of the island platform canopy came from Birmingham Snow Hill station. That is marked on the canopy. The canopy itself was constructed for the opening of the line to Kidderminster and was later extended. It was not brought in from elsewhere, as has been reported.

== Bewdley Tunnel ==
Just to the East of the station lies the 480-yard (440 m)-long Bewdley Tunnel.

== Potential services ==
Due to heavy congestion in the Wyre Forest, there have been calls for Bewdley station to be returned to the National Rail network. The idea of Kidderminster to Bewdley trains has been discussed at meetings with Central Trains, its successors London Midland, West Midlands Trains and Chiltern Railways. The obstacle was always the question of who would provide the infrastructure and staff. New services could run further than Kidderminster, to Birmingham, Dudley or London. West Midlands Trains said it planned to operate extensions of services from Kidderminster to the station by December 2019, though this has yet to occur.

=== Bewdley Express Trial ===
From the 1 September 2026, an eight-week trial commuter service under the name "Bewdley Express" was introduced with heritage rolling stock operating between Bewdley station and Kidderminster Town railway station, with through tickets allowing passengers to then transfer West Midlands Railway services at the mainline Kidderminster railway station for onward travel to Birmingham Snow Hill and beyond, with the primary aim of easing congestion on roads between Bewdley and Birmingham, and make Bewdley itself a more accessible destination. This service operated on Tuesdays, Wednesdays, and Thursdays only, with morning services departing from Bewdley at 06:40 and 07:40 am, and after passengers changed at Kidderminster, arriving into Birmingham Snow Hill and 07:46 and 08:46 am respectively. Evening return services departed from Birmingham Snow Hill and 04:46 and 05:46 pm, with passengers arriving into Bewley at 05:57 and 07:02 respectively.

The trial service would end on the 22 October 2026, with an overall 96 services being run and over 1,000 passengers being carried, some of which would use the service to travel to other destinations such as Plymouth, Glasgow, and Cornwall. If the trial is deemed as success, then mainline services that currently terminate at Kidderminster could be extended to instead terminate at Bewdley, providing a direct rail connection.

== Famous Media Appearances ==
Bewdley Railway Station has been used as a location for a number of television and cinema productions. These include the 1992 film Howards End, the 2007 film Woes of the Departed, and, as "Musborough Junction" station, the opening scenes of the 1984 BBC Television adaptation of the John Masefield novel The Box of Delights (keen-eyed viewers will spot the Bewdley station sign reflected in a window).

Preceding station	Heritage railways	Following station
Northwood Halt towards Bridgnorth	Severn Valley Railway	Kidderminster Town Terminus
Disused railways
Northwood Halt; Line and station open	Great Western Railway; Severn Valley Railway	Rifle Range Halt; Line open, station closed
Northwood Halt; Line and station open	Great Western Railway; Severn Valley Railway	Burlish Halt; Line and station closed
Wyre Forest; Line and station closed	Great Western Railway; Tenbury and Bewdley Railway	Terminus
