= Hartlebury Common =

Lowland heath in Worcestershire, England

Coordinates: 52.336703°N 2.259836°W

- Site of Special Scientific Interest
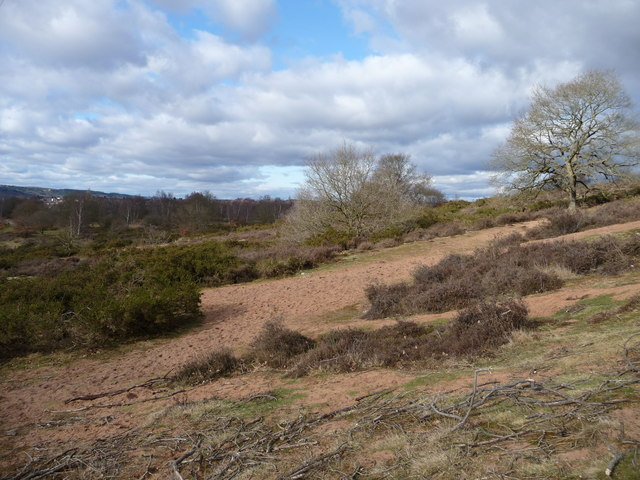
- Hartlebury Common
- Location of Hartlebury Common.
- Area of search: Hereford And Worcester
- Grid reference: SO 824707
- Interest: Biological/Geological
- Area: 90.2 ha
- Notification date: 1955, 1986

Hartlebury Common is an area of lowland heath in north Worcestershire, England, situated just outside the town of Stourport-on-Severn. Hartlebury Common and Hillditch Coppice are a biological and geological Site of Special Scientific Interest which covers an area of 90.2 hectares (229 acres). The common supports many varieties of wild plants and insects, especially butterflies and moths. Hartlebury Common and Hillditch Pool are a Local Nature Reserve.

The common is easily accessed from several small car parks and popular with horse riders, walkers, joggers and naturalists. There are waymarked trails for walkers and horse riders such as the heather trail and horse route.

== Location ==
The site lies on the southeast edge of Stourport-on-Severn. It can be accessed via the Wilden Top car park on the B1495 Stourport to Hartlebury Road, the Lower Poollands car park off Titton Lane and three car parks on the A4025 Stourport to Worcester Road.

== Toponymy ==
The name Hartlebury is derived from the Anglo-Saxon Heoertlabyrig meaning "Hill of the Deer".

== Geology ==
Hartlebury Common lies on Quaternary wind-blown sand which covers two river terraces of the River Severn overlying Bunter and Keuper Sandstone. It is situated within the Abberley and Malvern Hills Geopark which was launched in 2004. Falling within the counties of Herefordshire, Gloucestershire, Shropshire and Worcestershire the Geopark covers 3,240 km^{2} (1,250 square miles). The geological and geomorphological significance of the area has been recognised for many years with 13 Sites of Special Scientific Interest (SSSI) and 179 Local Geological Sites (LGS) present. The Abberley and Malvern Hills Geopark is one of only seven geoparks in the UK.

== Archaeology ==
Hartlebury Common supports a range of archaeological remains including stone revetted banks, historic trackways (or 'holloways'), post-medieval quarries and pools that contain paleoenvironmental deposits and the site of a 19th-century rifle range. There is also evidence of a large circular embanked enclosure on the common which may have been a signalling post, hunting lodge, small ringwork castle or religious site. Mesolithic and Neolithic artefacts have also been found at the site.
