= Hartlebury =

Village in Worcestershire, England

Coordinates: 52.33°N 2.23°W

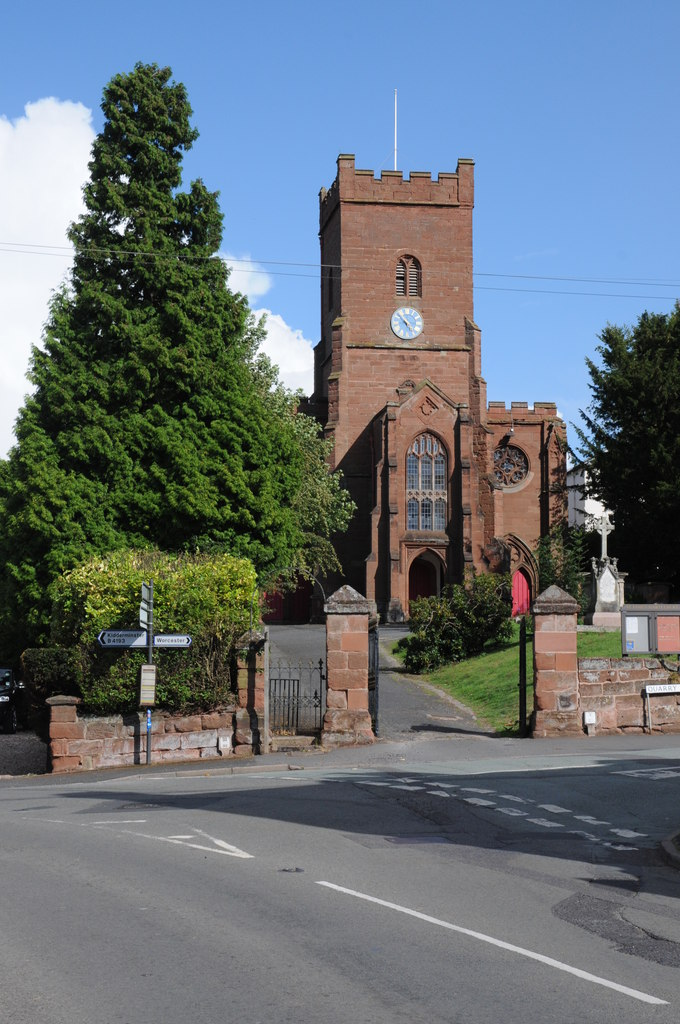
- Hartlebury Parish Church

- Location within Worcestershire
- Population: 3,083
- District: Wychavon
- Shire county: Worcestershire
- Region: West Midlands
- Country: England
- Sovereign state: United Kingdom
- Post town: Kidderminster
- Postcode district: DY11
- Dialling code: 01299
- Police: West Mercia
- Fire: Hereford and Worcester
- Ambulance: West Midlands
- UK Parliament: Droitwich and Evesham

Hartlebury is a village and civil parish in the Wychavon district of Worcestershire, England. It is 4 miles (6.4 km) south of Kidderminster. The village had a population of 3,083 in the 2021 Census.

The village is green-buffered from surrounding villages except for the village of Waresley which is contiguous with Hartlebury. The civil parish covering the village also includes the outlying villages of Crossway Green and Torton.

Hartlebury railway station is located 800 metres to the east of the village centre.

== History ==
=== Name ===
The name Hartlebury derives from the Old English Heortlaburh meaning 'Heortla's fortification'.

=== Hartlebury Castle ===
Hartlebury Castle was built in the mid-13th century as a fortified manor house. Until 2007 it was the residence of the Bishop of Worcester, with two-thirds of the building leased out to Worcestershire County Council as the Worcestershire County Museum. Hartlebury Castle is a Grade I listed building. It is about a mile to the west of the village and half a mile to the west of the church.

=== Queen Elizabeth Grammar School ===
Queen Elizabeth (I) Grammar School (the regnal number was added in 1952 on the accession of Elizabeth II) was in Hartlebury until 1977. The earliest record of the precursor to the school is in the Domesday Book, compiled in 1086. Other early accounts date to 1400, well before Harrow and Rugby were founded. The school was granted a Royal Charter by Queen Elizabeth I in 1557. Originally a private boys school, it was taken over by the State, and was closed when it was merged in 1977 with King Charles I Grammar School, Kidderminster, and The Kidderminster Girls High School to form King Charles I School. The oldest building standing was converted to a house. Its magnificent New Building has commanding views over fields and woodland, and was rescued from demolition by its alumni association.

=== New Elizabethan School ===
A very small independent school unconnected educationally with Hartlebury School opened in 2008: the fee-paying New Elizabethan School was set up to cater for children "who have found learning and school attendance difficult" on part of the Hartlebury School site. A private school, for young boys and girls, operated there 1979–2007, Bowbrook School — renamed Hartlebury Independent School in 1999, then Hartlebury School in 2000. In 2007, it became a charitable organisation. Then in 2008 it was re-launched in its new form.

== Former buildings ==
=== The Worcestershire house ===
A 17th-century house from Hartlebury, now known as 'The Worcestershire House', was re-assembled at the Frontier Culture Museum in Virginia, USA, in 1992. The John Smith (Smyth or Smythe) family built it in the 1630s. An example of the Tudor frame variety of timber framing construction, it was dismantled in 1970 and shipped to America.

== Notable people ==
- Henry Eliot Howard, ornithologist, conducted much of his research in the grounds of his home, 'Clareland', which is extant, and is Grade II listed.

== See also ==
- Hartlebury Common
- List of English and Welsh endowed schools (19th century)
