= Kidnapping and murder of Lesley Whittle =

1975 death in England

Lesley Whittle
- Lesley Whittle, pictured at her brother Ronald's wedding in October 1972
- Born: 3 May 1957; Bridgnorth, Shropshire, England
- Disappeared: Highley, Shropshire, England
- Died: c. 17 January 1975 (age 17); Kidsgrove, Staffordshire, England
- Cause of death: Vagal inhibition
- Resting place: Highley Parish Church, Shropshire, England; 52.4468°N 2.3822°W (approximate)
- Education: Wulfrun College, Wolverhampton
- Occupation: Student
- Known for: Victim of kidnapping and murder
- Height: 5 ft (152 cm)
- Parents: George Whittle (father); Dorothy Walker (mother)

The kidnapping and murder of Lesley Whittle occurred on 14 January 1975. Whittle, a teenage heiress, was kidnapped at gunpoint from her home in Highley, Shropshire, by Donald Neilson, a notorious burglar and murderer known as the Black Panther.

Whittle was driven 65 miles (105 km) from her home to an underground drainage shaft of a reservoir at Bathpool Park in Kidsgrove, Staffordshire, where she was tethered, naked, upon a narrow platform 54 feet (16 m) below ground by a wire noose affixed around her neck and with a hood placed over her head as Neilson made several unsuccessful attempts to collect a £50,000 ransom from her family over the following days. She is believed to have either fallen to her death from this shaft, or been pushed to her death by Neilson, on or about 17 January, causing her to die of vagal inhibition. Her emaciated body was discovered hanging from this shaft on 7 March 1975.

The kidnapping and murder of Lesley Whittle dominated national headlines for eleven months; the investigation into her kidnapping and—ultimately—murder, involved more than 400 officers from three separate police forces in addition to the Metropolitan Police.

Donald Neilson was arrested in Mansfield in December 1975 on unrelated charges; he was convicted of Whittle's kidnapping and murder in July 1976 at Oxford Crown Court and sentenced to life imprisonment. He was later convicted of the shooting murders of three post office workers and given three further life sentences.

== Background ==
=== Lesley Whittle ===
Lesley Ann Whittle was born on 3 May 1957. She was the younger of two children and only daughter born to George Whittle, a co-owner of Whittle Coaches, and his common-law wife, Dorothy. George was a self-made businessman who had begun his career as a bus driver but had established a haulage company in the 1930s, which he evolved into a coach firm and which gradually became one of the most successful coach businesses in the Midlands, with a fleet of seventy vehicles by the 1960s. As such, the Whittle family were wealthy and lived in the largest house in the mining village of Highley, Shropshire. This property was a six-bedroom detached house named Beechcroft.

Although from a wealthy family, Lesley did not live an affluent lifestyle, with her inheritance held in trust and Dorothy giving her £20 a week in spending money (the equivalent of approximately £190 as of 2026). She has been described as a studious, intelligent and compassionate individual who enjoyed tap dancing as a child.

At the time of her kidnapping, Lesley was in her second year at Wulfrun College, Wolverhampton, studying for her A-levels in pure and applied mathematics. She did not own a car, and commuted to her studies via public transport on a daily basis. Lesley's boyfriend, Richard Forder (19), studied at the University of Sheffield, and she held aspirations to transfer to this university upon completion of her studies at Wulfrun in order that she could be closer to him.

=== Inheritance ===
To avoid estate taxes, George Whittle gave three houses plus £70,000 in cash to Dorothy, £107,000 to his son Ronald, and £82,500 to Lesley during his life. He died of natural causes in September 1970, aged 65, bequeathing the coach firm to his son. His will left nothing to his estranged wife, Selina Whittle (69), to whom he had been married since 1926 but whom he had never divorced following their separation in the 1940s. In 1972, two years after George's death, Selina began legal proceedings to obtain money from her husband's estate; she would later be awarded £1,500, plus weekly payments of £30. (Note: George Whittle had encountered Lesley's mother, Dorothy, via his work as a bus driver while still married. The couple never married, although Dorothy legally changed her surname to Whittle. After separating from his wife, George Whittle never paid Selina more than £2 a week in maintenance payments, repeatedly declaring to his first wife he could not afford to increase the payments due to financial hardships.) The story was reported extensively in the Daily Express on 17 May 1972 and included the information that the family assets totalled more than £250,000 (the equivalent of approximately £2.98 million as of 2026).

== Kidnapping ==
=== Planning ===
Donald Neilson and Lesley Whittle

Police subsequently discovered that Whittle's kidnapper had devoted almost three years of planning, researching and rehearsing the crime after reading the 1972 Daily Express news article regarding the financial dispute between Dorothy and Selina Whittle and the sums bequeathed to his children. Neilson had estimated that the Whittles could easily afford a sum of £50,000, and his preparations had included discreetly entering the Whittles' home at night on several occasions without awakening Lesley or her mother to familiarise himself with the layout of the home and select the most secure route to remove his hostage.

Neilson had originally decided to kidnap either Ronald or Dorothy Whittle and hold them until his demanded ransom had been paid. He had originally planned the kidnap to occur in January 1974, but delayed his plans by twelve months until January 1975 due to the nationwide petrol shortages of the three-day week; he feared potentially drawing attention to himself on crucial dates by driving the considerable distances necessary from his home in West Yorkshire to Shropshire and, ultimately, Staffordshire, without a plausible explanation.

=== Enactment ===
In the early hours of 14 January 1975, Dorothy Whittle returned from an evening social visit to her home in Highley, Shropshire. (Note: Dorothy would later inform police she returned home at approximately 1:30 a.m.) At approximately 1:45 a.m. she checked on her daughter, only to find Lesley asleep in her first-floor bedroom. Dorothy then took two sleeping tablets and went to bed herself. Shortly after Dorothy retired to bed, Neilson cut the telephone line to the house (suspecting a burglar alarm), then entered the Whittles' home through the garage; he placed a box of Turkish delight atop a large flower vase upon a hearth rug in the lounge, then placed three coiled Dymotape messages upon this confectionery box. Neilson then ascended the stairs to Lesley's bedroom.

Encountering Lesley asleep in her bed, Neilson shook the teenager's shoulder until she began to awake before placing his hand over her mouth as she opened her eyes to see him pointing a gun at her face. Gagging the teenager, who was allowed to dress only in her dressing gown and slippers, he ordered her at gunpoint out of the house and into his green Morris 1300, where he bound her wrists and ankles before blindfolding her and ordering her to lie on the back seat beneath a foam mattress.

Neilson then briefly retrieved approximately £200 in cash from the home before driving Lesley sixty-five miles to Bathpool Park in Kidsgrove, Staffordshire. At this location, he removed the blindfold from her eyes and the bindings from her ankles before forcing her down an iron ladder into the narrow drainage shaft of a nearby reservoir. The two navigated several obstacles, including an underground waterfall, until they reached a narrow ledge 54 feet (16 m) beneath ground. This ledge was just sixty centimetres in width.

At this location, Neilson removed Lesley's gag after telling her to remain quiet and that nobody could hear her scream; he then cut the bindings on her wrists, then told her to remove her dressing gown to dry herself. He then placed a hood over her head and tethered her by the neck to the side of the shaft via a wire noose attached to cord 5 feet (1.5 m) in length. A mattress, torch and a sleeping bag were already upon the ledge and according to some sources, Neilson gave the naked teenager a flask of soup, a bottle of brandy, a small puzzle, and six paperback books to occupy her time and insulate her against the frigid temperature.

According to Neilson, Lesley then asked for her dressing gown before he replied in a fake West Indies accent: "Dressing gown still wet." Lesley then pleaded, "When can I go home?" to which Neilson explained she would only be released upon payment of the ransom he had demanded. He then returned to his home in Bradford, where that morning and afternoon, he made a point of being seen by neighbours.

=== Ransom discovery ===
"No police £50,000 ransom to be ready to deliver wait for telephone call at Swan shopping centre telephone box 6pm to 1am if no call return following evening when you answer call give your name only and listen you must follow instructions without argument from the time you answer you are on a time limit if police or tricks death"

— Transcript of one of the Dymotape messages left in the Whittle household following the kidnap of Lesley Whittle.

At 6:50 a.m. the following day, after her daughter failed to come for breakfast, Dorothy entered her daughter's bedroom only to find Lesley missing and the clothes she intended to wear at college that day still neatly folded upon a chair. After searching the house for her daughter and discovering a door to the lounge connecting to the adjoining garage ajar, Dorothy picked up her telephone to ring Lesley's 28-year-old brother Ronald in the hope she was at his home, only to find it dead; she then rushed in her dressing gown to her car and drove to Ronald's house, where she learned from Ronald and his wife, Gaynor, that they had not seen Lesley that morning. The trio immediately drove back to her home.

Upon their return, the trio discovered the phone lines had been cut and that only Lesley's dressing gown and slippers were missing. Gaynor then discovered the three coiled Dymotape ransom notes Neilson had placed in the lounge. The ransom notes were typed upon strips of red Dymotape in capital letters. These notes demanded a £50,000 ransom (the equivalent of approximately £390,000 as of 2026) for Lesley's safe return and instructed the family not to contact the police, but to wait for a telephone call at a phone box at the Swan shopping centre in Kidderminster that evening. Despite the kidnapper's threats of death if police became involved, Ronald immediately notified West Mercia Police of the kidnapping.

== Investigation ==
The investigation into Lesley's kidnapping was led by Detective Chief Superintendent Robert Booth of West Mercia Police, with assistance from Scotland Yard, who assigned twelve individuals trained to deal with kidnapping to the case, including DCI Walter Boreham. All agreed the kidnapping was not the work of an amateur and that Ronald should follow the kidnapper's outlined demands without disclosing police involvement. Booth also forbade any details of the kidnapping to be released to the media and ordered the phone to the Whittles' home and the phone box in Kidderminster the kidnapper intended to contact tapped as Ronald contacted his bank in Bridgnorth to arrange to collect £50,000 in used banknotes as instructed upon one of the Dymotape messages.

=== Press leak ===
Within fifteen hours of Lesley's kidnapping, the efforts of investigators to ensure her recovery were severely compromised when an unknown person informed a freelance journalist of the kidnapping. The journalist sold details of the ongoing investigation to a Birmingham-based newspaper and the BBC, who broadcast it on the Nine O'Clock News. (Note: The BBC interrupted several of their evening programmes on 14 and 15 January to broadcast newsflashes regarding Lesley's kidnap.) As such, Lesley's kidnapping became nationwide news before Neilson had initiated contact with her family.

== Initial contact efforts ==
Neilson did not attempt to initiate contact at the Swan shopping centre telephone box until 1 a.m. on 15 January; although police were aware of the press leak by mid-afternoon on the date of the kidnapping and the resultant media intrusion, detectives were anxious for the kidnapper(s) not to discover the Whittles had informed the police of Lesley's kidnapping. As such, police had decided to withdraw Ronald from the vicinity of the phone box four hours before Neilson attempted to initiate contact. (Neilson had been unaware of the news leak at this stage.)

On 15 January, Neilson returned to Bathpool Park, where he ordered Lesley to recite a message he had penned for her family from a writing pad into a tape-recorder. This message began with the words "Please, mum" before Lesley assured her family she was safe, adding: "I'm okay. I got a bit wet but I'm quite dry now. I'm being treated very well, okay." She then conveyed Neilson's instructions as to where they were to travel to find further instructions how to deliver the money to secure her release. He then prepared further Dymotape messages which he discreetly placed in several phone boxes across the West Midlands.

=== Shooting of Gerald Smith ===
On the evening of 15 January, Neilson drove to a car park close to Dudley Zoo with the intention to leave a section of his relayed instructions for Ronald in a phone box. As he surveyed the area, he was observed loitering close to a perimeter fence by a 44-year-old security guard named Gerald Smith. Smith became suspicious of Neilson's furtive behaviour and confronted him. As Smith turned to return to his depot to contact the police, Neilson shot him six times with a handgun—predominantly in the back—before fleeing the scene on foot. Smith would die from his injuries fourteen months later, although he did provide police with an identikit of his assailant, whom he erroneously described as having a local dialect.

==== Ballistics revelations ====
The six spent cartridges recovered from the scene of Smith's shooting were subjected to ballistics testing at a Nottingham-based laboratory. The results of these tests confirmed the firearm used in the shooting was one of two used in the fatal shooting of a 43-year-old sub-postmaster named Derek Astin the previous September. The perpetrator of this shooting was known as the Black Panther: a notorious burglar and murderer linked to more than 400 burglaries across England—typically committed at post offices—whom police had been hunting for almost ten years and for whom the Post Office and the National Federation of SubPostmasters had offered a joint £25,000 reward for information leading to the arrest and conviction.

== Kidnapper's instructions ==
At 11:45 p.m. on 16 January, Neilson successfully initiated telephone contact with Lesley's family. He immediately played the 89-second tape recording of Lesley relaying instructions to her family as to how to deliver the ransom. (Note: This recording of Lesley's voice was played twice in succession by Neilson within the call to ensure the message was conveyed to her family.) The instructions conveyed in this recording were that a member of her family was to drive with the ransom money to a specific telephone box in Kidsgrove to retrieve a second message concealed behind the back-board of the phone box.

=== Thwarted ransom delivery ===
With Ronald's agreement, Scotland Yard investigators placed a covert listening device beneath his suit in order that he could communicate with officers, who guaranteed him assistance within two minutes should he request it. Ronald left Bridgnorth police station to drive to the Kidsgrove telephone box at 1:30 a.m. on 17 January, discreetly followed from a safe distance by several unmarked police vehicles. Being unfamiliar with Kidsgrove, Ronald twice became lost, and only arrived at the telephone box at 3 a.m. After searching for almost thirty minutes he found the Dymotape message, which directed him to Bathpool Park, just 1.5 miles (2.4 km) from the telephone box. The message instructed him to drive up Boathouse Road, then turn right onto a public footpath and drive to a "no entry service area". He was then to drive past a wall, flash his headlights and look for a torch signal, then retrieve the torch, which would have instructions upon it. The message ended with the words "Go home wait for telephone."

Ronald arrived at Bathpool Park and turned into the service area as instructed, but in the dark he did not see the low wall that edged the railway bridge, and drove to the end of the lane. He stopped and repeatedly flashed his headlights before exiting the car and shouting statements to the effect of, "This is Ronald Whittle! Is anyone there?" before driving up and down the road and repeatedly flashing his headlights. After approximately one hour, he reluctantly drove from the area and met with investigators at a prearranged meeting point.

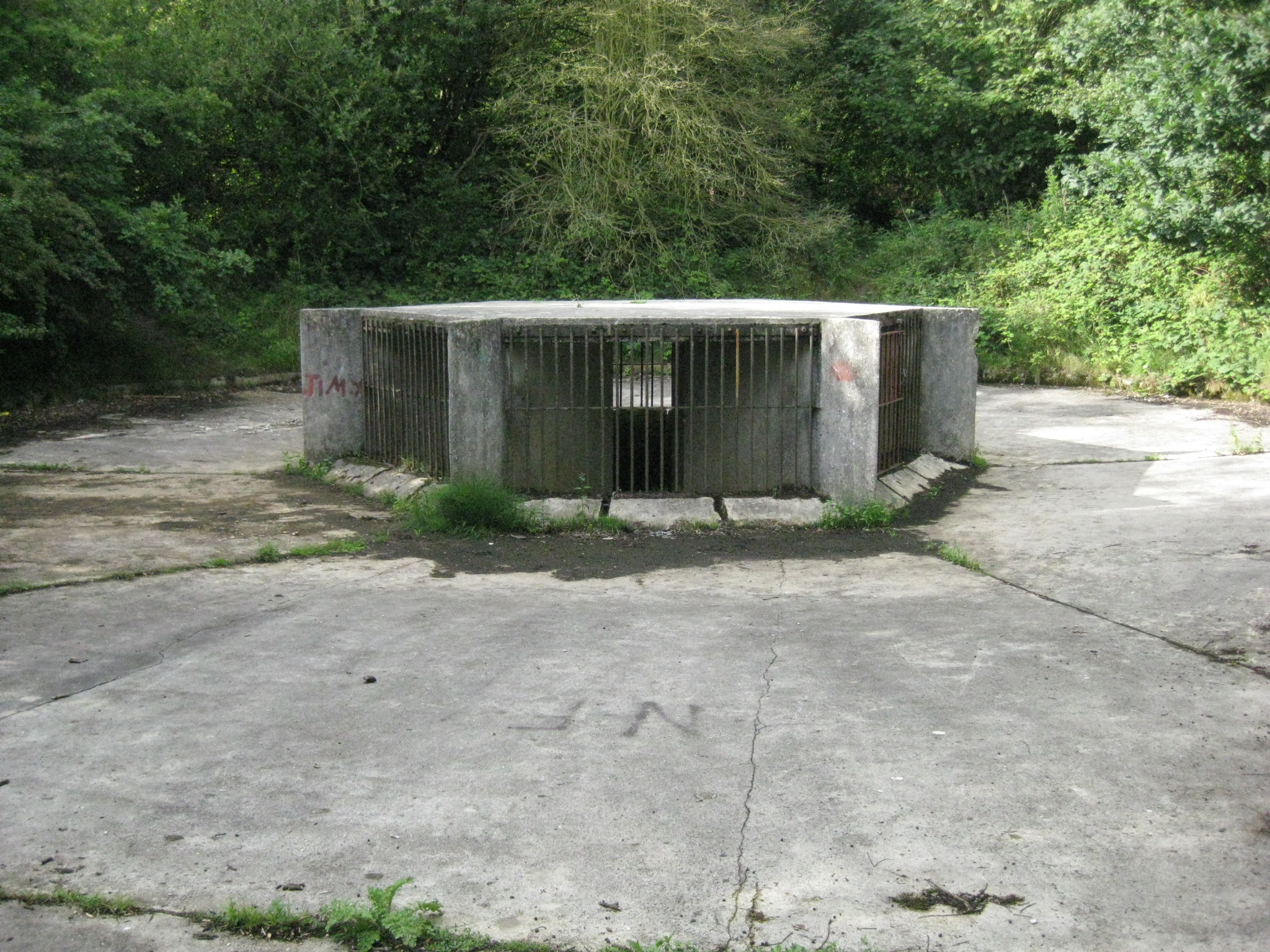
The entrance to one of the drainage shafts at Bathpool Park. A search of this location by Scotland Yard on 17 January failed to locate several items left by Lesley's kidnapper.

West Mercia police officers later placed all blame for this failed ransom delivery on Staffordshire Police since a patrol car from their division was seen driving through—and parking within—the vicinity of the intended rendezvous. However, unbeknownst to Ronald Whittle or the police, a young courting couple had driven into the park at 2:45 a.m. and parked close to the rendezvous point; the couple had been puzzled to observe a torch repeatedly flashing in their direction from nearby woodland.

A discreet search of Bathpool Park by Scotland Yard was conducted the following morning. Detective Chief Superintendent Booth was informed the search had revealed "nothing of significance".

== Vehicle discovery ==
On 23 January, West Midlands Police contacted their West Mercia counterparts to report that since the night of Gerald Smith's shooting a stolen dark green Morris 1300 had been left near the Dudley Freightliner Terminal, just 459 feet (140 m) from where Smith had been shot. A routine inspection of the vehicle had revealed the registration number (TTV 454H) did not match that on the vehicle tax disc and that the car itself had been stolen from West Bromwich more than three months previously.

Inside the car boot were a cassette tape-recorder containing a female voice investigators determined was Lesley Whittle and which they later determined had been intended for the aborted ransom collection of 15 January. On the tape, Lesley asked her relatives to co-operate with the kidnapper and recited instructions for the ransom carrier drive from "the M6 north to junction ten, and then to the A454 towards Walsall" to a telephone booth where instructions had been concealed. Also discovered were four envelopes detailing the route the ransom carrier had been intended to take on 15 January (including a telephone box close to the site of Smith's shooting), a microphone, a gun, several heavy-duty plastic sheets, a torch, a foam mattress, and numerous Dymotape messages containing messages clearly indicative of a ransom trail.

Sections of hair recovered from the back seat of the car were later proven to be a precise match for samples of hair recovered from a hairbrush from Lesley's bedroom, indicating the vehicle had been used in her actual kidnapping.

=== Link to Black Panther manhunt ===
Although ballistics testing upon the firearm used in the shooting of Smith had already linked his attempted murderer to one of the murder victims of the Black Panther, similar forensic testing upon the firearm recovered from the vehicle confirmed the weapon had been used to fatally shoot all three sub-postmasters murdered by this assailant the previous year.

The discovery of the contents of the Morris 1300 ultimately linked Lesley's kidnapping to the same offender, who had earned his media moniker due to his invariably dressing in black and wearing a black balaclava when committing his burglaries. Prior to Lesley's kidnapping, sections of the media had already termed the Black Panther as Public Enemy Number One.

== Later developments ==
=== Staged television confrontation ===
Following the thwarted ransom delivery of 17 January, Detective Chief Superintendent Booth was eager both for the kidnapper to initiate contact with the Whittles for a third time to arrange an alternative ransom delivery, and for police to instigate a second, more thorough search of Bathpool Park. He was also eager to maintain the impression to the kidnapper that the Whittle family had not contacted police at any point since Lesley's kidnap and prior to the discovery of the contents of his vehicle.

Following the discovery of the tape-recording of Lesley's voice and ballistics testing of the firearm linking Lesley's kidnapping and Smith's shooting to the Black Panther, police now had a justified reason to announce their involvement publicly. A television appeal was made by Ronald and Dorothy Whittle in which Ronald reiterated his eagerness for the kidnapper to re-initiate contact with him and his willingness to deliver the ransom money to secure Lesley's release. By agreement with Robert Booth, he did not divulge his previously having involved police. The Black Panther did not respond to this appeal.

To maintain the impression police had not been involved prior to the discovery of Neilson's vehicle, Booth and Ronald Whittle participated in a staged television interview on 5 March in which Ronald seemingly revealed to the interviewer his aborted ransom delivery attempt on 17 January. By prearrangement, Booth became irate upon learning this fact and terminated the interview.

=== Further evidence ===
Lesley's kidnapper did not respond to this ruse, although the following day, the headmaster of a local primary school in Kidsgrove who had seen the television interviews contacted detectives to state that two schoolboys had handed him a lantern-style torch they had discovered wedged in the grilles of what was known locally as the "Glory Hole" (one of the capped ventilation shafts of the old Harecastle Tunnel) in Bathpool Park several weeks previously. This individual had not realised the discovery was connected to Lesley's kidnap until watching the televised interviews. One of the schoolboys recalled a section of Dymotape had been sticking to the torch, but he had lost this.

Resultant publicity of this revelation resulted in an 11-year-old schoolboy contacting police to reveal he had discovered a section of red Dymotape reading "drop suitcase into hole" close to the same ventilation shaft in mid-January. The boy had retained this Dymotape message, which he handed to investigators. These revelations warranted a thorough inspection of the drainage and ventilation system beneath the park.

== Search of Bathpool Park ==
On 6 March 1975, police began a second, more thorough search of Bathpool Park than that conducted by Scotland Yard on 17 January. This search was conducted with the assistance of search dogs and began at the drainage shaft where the schoolboys had previously discovered the kidnapper's torch and within the railings of which a detective constable almost immediately found a Dymotape machine and a section of Dymotape. Also discovered in this search was a spanner evidently used to unlock the metal bars to the drainage shaft (some of which were still dislodged), plus a leather jacket and a pair of binoculars at a separate drainage site. All the items recovered except for the binoculars had no identifying marks and thus were untraceable. The serial number upon the binoculars was traced to a shop; investigators ultimately discovered the purchaser had used a false name and address.

An inspection of a second shaft within the park revealed nothing of significance. The third shaft, the deepest of the three and once an air ventilation shaft for a coal mine, was then uncapped. As the shaft was subject to HM Inspectorate of Mines regulations, this location had to be checked for noxious gases as a precaution; as such, the search of this shaft was suspended until the following morning.

== Body discovery ==
The entrance to the drainage shaft at Bathpool Park where Lesley was held. Her body was discovered 54 feet (16 m) beneath this entrance.

On the morning of Friday 7 March 1975, police officers and mine rescue staff inspected the third and final shaft. (Note: This mine shaft was less than 600 feet (180 m) from the location where Ronald Whittle had attempted to deliver the ransom money on 17 January.) Accessed by a vertical ladder, 22 feet (6.7 m) down on the first landing, Detective Constable Philip Maskery discovered a broken police torch from the previous day's search. Upon a second ledge at 45 feet (14 m) beneath the entrance to the shaft, a cassette tape-recorder was found.

As Maskery descended to the third landing 54 feet (16 m) beneath the entrance to the shaft, his torch illuminated a rolled-up sleeping bag wrapped inside a plastic bag (likely improvised as a pillow), a yellow foam mattress, and a sleeping bag. Hanging suspended from the ledge of this platform, with her bare feet only 7 inches (180 mm) from the bottom of the shaft, was Lesley's naked and emaciated body, wearing only a pendant necklace her boyfriend had made for her and six silver bangles upon her right wrist. Her slippers lay among human waste at the base of the shaft just inches beneath her feet.

Upon hearing of the discovery of Lesley's body and the circumstances surrounding her death, Chief Superintendent Robert Booth remarked to the press: "I will get this callous killer if it's the last thing I [ever] do. I have said all along what an evil and terribly wicked man we are hunting ... In my wildest dreams I never dreamed he would do such a thing to the girl. It's terrible." (Note: At the conclusion of the inquest into Lesley's death on 10 March 1975, Ronald Whittle informed reporters: "We shall never know for certain, but I feel—rightly or wrongly—that the way in which [Lesley's kidnapping] was revealed in the press in the early days could quite easily have meant a quicker death than there might have been for Lesley. I hope that the press will now act more responsibly, and use their considerable power to make damn sure that this man comes to justice. It may be too late for Lesley, but I hope that he's caught before he does anything to anybody else.")

A subsequent inspection of the floor of the shaft, 7 feet (2.1 m) below the third landing, revealed several 3-inch strips of elastoplast which had evidently been used to blindfold and gag Lesley; (Note: One of these sections of elastoplast contained hairs sourcing from Lesley's eyebrows.) a pair of brown size 7 men's trainers; more Dymotape; a cassette tape (also containing Lesley's voice); a microphone and electric lead; a Thermos flask; men's blue corduroy trousers; and a reporter's notepad bearing a clear imprint of the kidnapper's handwriting instructing Lesley to recite a message into her kidnapper's tape-recorder. The imprint of this handwritten message read: 'Tell them to come to Kidsgrove Post Office telephone box. Instructions behind backboard tell them you OK, tell them no police or tricks.'

All items recovered from the three shafts and above ground were forensically inspected by the police, although only one partial fingerprint was recovered from the reporter's notepad. This was checked against nationwide databases; no match for the fingerprint could be found.

=== Post mortem ===
By the time of her discovery, Lesley had been deceased for a considerable length of time, with her body in an advanced state of decomposition. Her official cause of death was certified as being due to vagal inhibition caused by a signal from her vagus nerve likely responsive to her physical and psychological predicament triggering a response from her brain ultimately causing her heart to cease beating.

The pathologist who examined Lesley's body, Dr John Brown, was unable to determine the exact date or time of her death, although his autopsy report states Lesley had been deceased for "six weeks or more" by the time of her discovery, thus indicating her death most likely occurred between 17 and 24 January. Her body was markedly emaciated, weighing only 7 stone (98 lb or 44 kg). Furthermore, her stomach and intestines were completely empty.

==== Circumstances of death ====
Neilson always insisted Lesley accidentally fell to her death in the early hours of 17 January when she stepped aside as he climbed down the ladder to the narrow ledge where he had tethered her following the thwarted ransom delivery. However, at Neilson's trial, the prosecution contended he had deliberately pushed Lesley off the ledge in frustration at failing to secure the ransom, causing her to die of vagal inhibition due to high blood pressure in her carotid artery caused by the constrictive wire looped around her neck triggering an alarm to her brain via the vagal nerve. The response of the brain to this urgent signal for a reduction in arterial pressure would be to radically slow down the heart; when this failed, her heart had stopped beating. However, Neilson may not have been present when Lesley died as he may have fled from Bathpool Park on the night of the failed ransom collection, suspecting a police trap after the courting couple drove away from the rendezvous point after he had repeatedly flashed his torch. This scenario would leave Lesley alive and alone in the drainage shaft for a considerable period of time before she either fell to her death in a weakened and dehydrated condition or threw herself to her death in despair.

== Further investigations ==
Two days after the discovery of Lesley's body, Commander John Morrison of Scotland Yard's homicide division replaced Chief Superintendent Robert Booth as head of the investigation into the kidnapping and murder. The official reasoning for this decision was to provide necessary co-ordination to the differing investigations into each of the murders now linked to the Black Panther. The renewed investigation was headquartered at Kidsgrove police station.

Many fruitful lines of enquiry had already been vigorously pursued under Booth's command, including investigating the origins of the traceable items recovered from the kidnapper's vehicle and at Bathpool Park in addition to conducting a public appeal to trace the Black Panther by playing a secret recording made of the kidnapper talking with Ronald Whittle about delivering the ransom money on 16 January. Several of these lines of enquiry were again investigated under Morrison's command without success.

As postal orders stolen from post offices burgled by the perpetrator were almost exclusively cashed in the North of England, investigators concluded the Black Panther most likely lived and/or worked in Northern England. A media blackout was imposed on this revelation in order that the Black Panther continued to cash them, although the wide range of locations where they were cashed left investigators unable to pinpoint a prime geographical location where the offender lived.

In the spring of 1975, a reenactment of the Black Panther's movements on the dates of the kidnapping was filmed and broadcast nationwide, with the reconstruction using the stolen Morris 1300 recovered at the site of Gerald Smith's shooting. The actor dressed in similar clothes to the Black Panther, and the footage featured him driving to and standing by telephone boxes used in the kidnapper's ransom trail in addition to walking around Bathpool Park. Although more than 1,000 public tips were generated by this enactment, none named the actual perpetrator.

== Arrest ==
Despite ongoing efforts of investigators, Neilson would remain at liberty until December 1975. In the late evening of 11 December, two police officers spotted a man carrying a holdall loitering close to a post office in Mansfield. Questioned by the officers, he gave his name as "John Moxon" and claimed he was a lorry driver simply walking home; he then pointed a sawn-off shotgun at the officers as they noted his answers in a notebook, forcing PC Anthony White to enter the back seat as he entered the passenger side and shouted to PC Stuart McKenzie, "Right, drive!" as he pressed the shotgun beneath McKenzie's left armpit, further stating: "Take it easy, drive slowly, any tricks and you're dead." McKenzie was then ordered to drive to the village of Blidworth.

In the village of Rainworth, White noted Neilson had briefly pointed the gun away from McKenzie; he lunged for the shotgun as McKenzie braked hard, causing Neilson to discharge the firearm into the vehicle's roof, slightly injuring White's hand and perforating one of McKenzie's eardrums. The vehicle came to a halt outside a local fish and chip shop, where both officers continued struggling with the gunman. Two customers in the fish and chip shop, Keith Wood and Roy Morris, rushed to assist the officers. Following a violent struggle with all four men, Neilson was dragged to some nearby railings, to which he was handcuffed and searched. He was then driven to Kidsgrove police station to face formal questioning.

=== Confession ===
An examination of Neilson's possessions revealed two black hoods concealed beneath his jacket, leading police to suspect they had caught the Black Panther. His fingerprints were taken and revealed to be a precise match to the partial fingerprint upon the reporter's notebook recovered in the drainage shaft where Lesley had been held, although for twelve hours he refused to reveal his identity or admit his culpability in her kidnapping and murder.

On the morning of 13 December, Neilson suddenly asked one of his interrogators: "Can you protect my wife and daughter if I make a statement?" Although the officer replied he could not make any promises, but that he would arrange for him to see his family as soon as possible, Neilson replied: "I want to make a statement. I want everyone to know the truth. The girl needn't have died if the money was paid." In a subsequent nine-hour interview, Neilson formally confessed to Lesley's kidnapping; his confession ultimately covered eighteen pages. The confession was given to DCS Harold Wright, head of Staffordshire CID, and Commander Morrison of Scotland Yard, with the statement hand-written by DCI Walter Boreham.

On 15 December, Neilson was formally charged with Lesley's murder.

=== House search ===
A search of Neilson's Bradford home revealed numerous items of paraphernalia attesting to both his extensive methodology in planning and executing his burglaries and Lesley's kidnapping, and his fixation with the military. These included an 'operations' book listing post offices and wealthy homes Neilson had considered targets for future burglaries, balaclavas, maps, coils of rope, a roll of silver heavy duty tape, radios, torches, knives, jemmies, crossbows, bandoliers containing live rounds, haversacks and a sawn-off shotgun. Also recovered were a .22 rifle, a further Dymotape machine and coils of wire of the type used to tether Lesley to the drainage shaft in Bathpool Park. The vast majority of these items were discovered concealed in the family attic, which Neilson's wife and daughter had been forbidden to enter.

== Trial and conviction ==
Neilson stood trial at Oxford Crown Court for the kidnap and murder of Lesley Whittle on 14 June 1976. He was tried before Mr Justice Mars-Jones. The prosecutor was Philip Cox QC, and he was defended by Gilbert Gray QC. Neilson pleaded guilty to Lesley's kidnapping and attempting to extort money from her family, but not guilty to her murder, which he claimed had been accidental.

During the prosecution's opening speech on behalf of the Crown, the audio recording Neilson had forced Lesley to recite and which he had played to her family just hours before the prosecution contended he had murdered her was broadcast in the courtroom, causing Neilson to openly weep into a handkerchief. This would prove to be the sole occasion throughout the trial in which Neilson displayed any emotion.

Neilson took the stand in his own defence; he remained in the witness box for nineteen hours—extensively detailing his planning and execution of the kidnapping "operation" and reiterating his claim Lesley's death had been accidental. When questioned as to the circumstances surrounding Lesley's death, Neilson described flashing his torch at the courting couple's vehicle in the early hours of 17 January, believing the vehicle to be driven by the ransom carrier, before observing a patrol car enter the rendezvous point. He had then returned to the shaft where, he claimed, Lesley fell to her death as he climbed down the ladder to where she was tethered. Neilson remained adamant the threat he had typed on the Dymotape and left in the Whittles' lounge—"if police or tricks death"— was not one he intended to carry out and although he had failed to secure the ransom money, Neilson still considered the kidnapping a success, stating: "The most important part to me of any crime is to be free at the end."

To support Neilson's contention Lesley's death had been accidental, his defence counsel emphasized that the length of wire tethering Lesley to the drainage shaft was sufficient in length for her feet to touch the base of the shaft and she would not have died but for the fact the wire had snagged on the ledge of the platform where she had been held. Despite the fact Lesley was emaciated by the time of her death—suggesting she had not eaten for well over twenty-four hours before she died—Neilson also claimed he had bought her fish and chips and a copy of Vogue magazine during her confinement in the shaft. This was refuted by the prosecution, who referenced the post-mortem examination of Lesley's body revealing she had not eaten in days and that no magazine was discovered in the shaft.

Neilson's trial lasted two weeks. On 1 July 1976, the jury retired to consider their verdict. Deliberations lasted for less than two hours before the jury announced they had reached their verdict: Neilson was found guilty of Lesley's murder, for which he was given a life sentence; and a concurrent sentence of sixty-one years for her kidnapping. Upon passing sentence, Judge Mars-Jones informed Neilson: "In your case, life must mean life." (Note: Neilson's formal sentencing for Lesley's kidnapping and murder was delayed until the conclusion of his second trial.)

On 21 July, Neilson was convicted of the 1974 murders of three sub-postmasters and given three further concurrent life sentences. Mr Justice Mars-Jones also presided at this trial; he again referred to Lesley's kidnapping and murder in his sentencing phase, stating her death was a further "enterprise that ended in murder".

Neilson remained incarcerated for the remainder of his life, and died on 18 December 2011 at the age of 75. (Note: Criminal charges against Neilson pertaining to the murder of security guard Gerald Smith were left on file as Smith had died more than a year and a day after the shooting.)

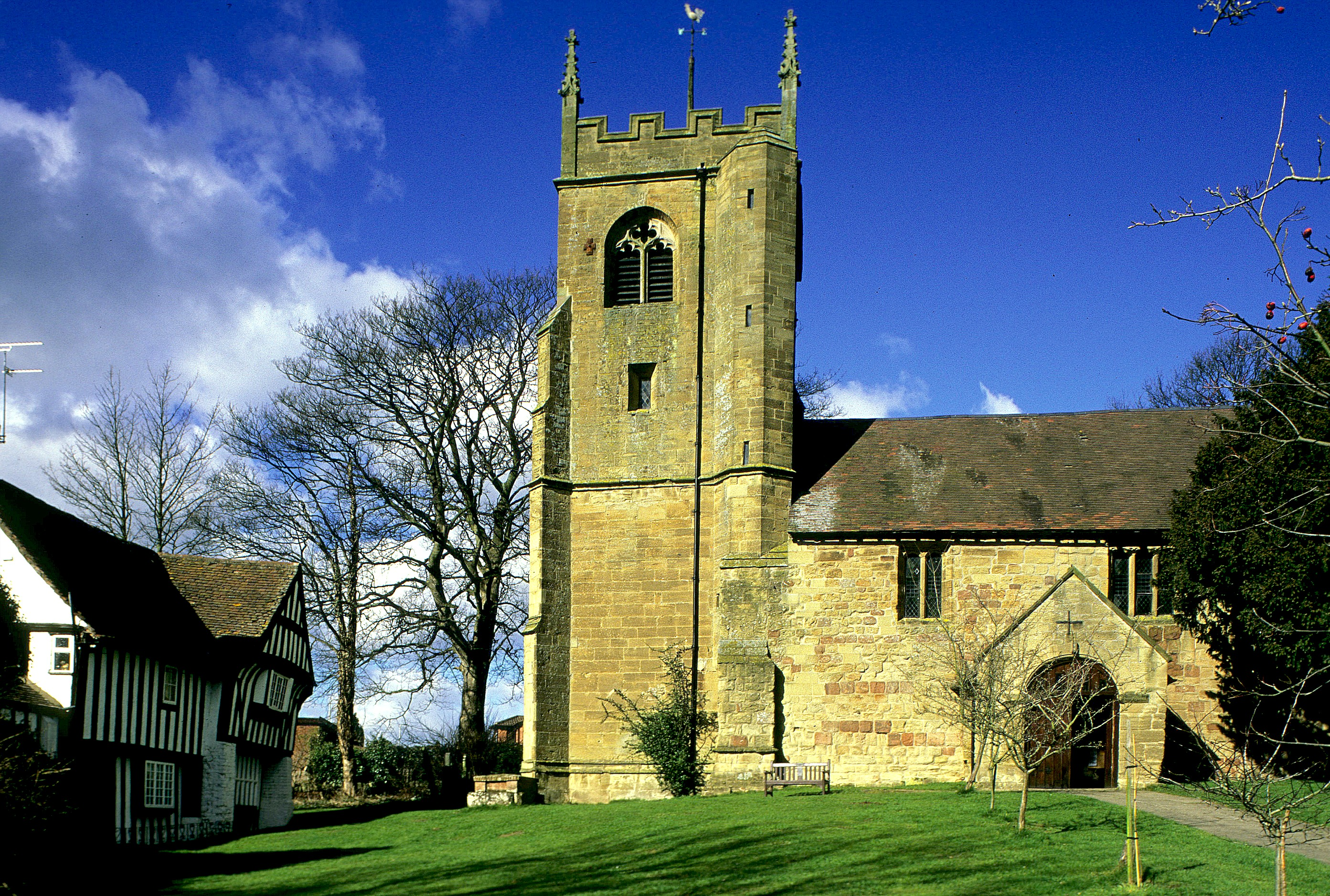
Highley Parish Church. Lesley Whittle's funeral took place at this location.

== Aftermath ==
Lesley Whittle's funeral was conducted at Highley Parish Church on 14 March 1975. The funeral service was attended by well over one hundred people, including Chief Superintendent Robert Booth. Six members of the Whittle coach firm served as pallbearers at the service. Her body was later cremated at Bushbury Crematorium, Wolverhampton.

Ronald and Dorothy Whittle later dedicated a brass plaque to the memory of Lesley and her father. This plaque is installed within the porch of Highley Parish Church. The inscription upon this plaque reads: "In loving memory George Whittle (1905–1970) and his daughter Lesley Whittle (1957–1975)".

Shortly after Commander John Morrison replaced Chief Superintendent Robert Booth as head of the investigation into Whittle's kidnapping and murder, Booth was demoted to the rank of uniformed officer. He later stated the decisions to remove him as head of the investigation and his subsequent demotion left him deeply disillusioned with those who made these decisions to scapegoat him for the errors and failures of others not under his command, and likely made to appease an outraged public.

Immediately I recognized that what had happened was that the kidnapper had panicked because of that police car ... I have no doubts whatsoever in my mind that that's what had compromised the operation: he murdered her because of that police car causing him to panic and he vented his anger on her by pushing her to her death down that shaft, that hellhole of a place of confinement.

— Robert Booth, reflecting on the fatal consequences of Neilson observing a Staffordshire Police patrol car parking close to the rendezvous point in the early hours of the thwarted ransom delivery. 2002.

Until his own death, Booth repeatedly blamed both Staffordshire Police and Scotland Yard for thwarting the intended ransom delivery on 16–17 January—errors he remained adamant may have contributed to Lesley's death.

Booth cited Staffordshire Police as potentially frightening Neilson at a crucial moment in the ransom delivery by allowing a patrol car from their division to drive openly into the vicinity of the intended rendezvous point and briefly park alongside the courting couple who inadvertently parked at this location despite the fact Staffordshire Police had been informed the kidnapping ransom was to be paid at this location; (Note: Following his arrest, Neilson informed police he had increasingly sensed a police trap unfolding as he waited for Ronald to deliver the ransom money to Bathpool Park.) he also cited Scotland Yard as culpable for delaying Ronald Whittle at Bridgnorth police station for more than an hour—without his (Booth's) knowledge—as they finished recording the serial number of every banknote to be paid to the kidnapper. Booth remained adamant that, if not for this delay, Ronald would have arrived at the rendezvous with the ransom money before the courting couple parked at the kidnapper's instructed location.

Following his convictions, Neilson was transferred to HM Prison Leicester to serve his life sentence. He was transferred to several other facilities in the following decades, including HM Prison Isle of Wight and HM Prison Leeds. In 1993, he was transferred to HM Prison Full Sutton.

By 2008, Neilson had been transferred to HM Prison Norwich, and had been suffering from motor neurone disease for several years, gradually leaving him unable to use his limbs and requiring him to be spoon-fed. He appealed against his sentence, requesting it be commuted to a maximum of thirty years. His appeal was heard at the High Court in London, with Mr Justice Teare ruling on 12 June that he must never be released from prison, saying: "This is a case where the gravity of the applicant's offences justifies a whole life order ... The manner in which the young girl was killed demonstrates that it too involved a substantial degree of premeditation or planning. It also involved the abduction of the young girl. The location and manner of Lesley Whittle's death indicates that she must have been subjected by the applicant to a dreadful and horrific ordeal."

In the early hours of 17 December 2011, Neilson complained to prison staff of breathing difficulties. He was taken from HM Prison Norwich to Norfolk and Norwich University Hospital, where he died at 6:45 p.m. the following day. His death was officially ruled as being due to pneumonia, and he is known to have asked prison staff not to keep him alive if his health further deteriorated.

Many of Neilson's family members had severed all contact with him upon discovering his culpability in Lesley's kidnapping and murder. None of his family members were present at the time of his death, although his daughter did send a thank-you card to prison staff for the care they provided for her father in his final days.

At the time of Neilson's death, he was one of Britain's longest-serving prisoners, having been incarcerated for more than thirty-five years.

== Media ==
=== Film ===
- The 1977 film The Black Panther is directly inspired by the life and crimes of Neilson. Written by Michael Armstrong and directed by Ian Merrick, The Black Panther stars Donald Sumpter as Neilson and was released on 26 December 1977.

=== Bibliography ===
- Begg, Paul; Fido, Martin (1994). Great Crimes and Trials of the Twentieth Century. Great Britain: Carlton Books Limited. pp. 172–179. ISBN 978-0-671-71876-3.
- Hawkes, Harry (1978). The Capture of the Black Panther: Casebook of a Killer. London: George G.Harrap & Co Ltd. ISBN 978-0-245-53257-3.
- Lane, Brian; Gregg, Wilfred (1995) [1992]. The Encyclopedia Of Serial Killers. New York City: Berkley Book. pp. 288–291. ISBN 978-0-425-15213-3.
- Lowe, Gordon (2016). The Black Panther: The Trials and Abductions of Donald Neilson. Stroud: History Press. ISBN 978-0-750-96966-6.

=== Television ===
- Great Crimes and Trials of the 20th Century S01E22 "The Black Panther" (1992), commissioned by the BBC.
- Real Crime S02E09 "The Heiress and the Kidnapper" (2002), commissioned by ITV Studios.
- Born to Kill? S05E02 "Donald Neilson" (2013), commissioned by Twofour Productions.
- The Abduction of Lesley Whittle (2021), this 86-minute documentary was commissioned by Channel 5.

== See also ==
- List of kidnappings
- List of solved missing person cases: 1950–1999
- Stockholm syndrome

== Cited works and further reading ==
- Appleyard, Nicholas (2009). Life Means Life: Jailed Forever: True Stories of Britain's Most Evil Killers. London: John Blake Publishing. ISBN 978-1-476-60808-2.
- Collins, Daniel (2010). Crimes That Shocked The World: The Most Chilling True-Life Stories From the Last 40 Years. London: John Blake Publishing. ISBN 978-1-782-19157-5.
- Cowton, Michael (2020). Murders That Shocked the World: Cases of the 1970s. Horncastle: Banovallum Books. ISBN 978-1-911-65828-3.
- Fido, Martin (1995). Twentieth Century Murder: A Year by Year Account of the World's Most Pitiless Crimes. London: Bracken. ISBN 978-1-858-91390-2.
- Fraser, David K. (1996). Murder Cases of the Twentieth Century: Biographies and Bibliographies of 280 Convicted or Accused Killers. North Carolina: McFarland & Co. ISBN 978-1-476-60808-2.
- Hawkes, Harry (1978). The Capture of the Black Panther: Casebook of a Killer. London: George G.Harrap & Co Ltd. ISBN 978-0-245-53257-3.
- Heard, Brian John (2019). Kidnapping and Abduction. New York: Taylor & Francis Limited. ISBN 978-0-367-86943-4.
- Honeycombe, Gordon (2014). Dark Secrets of the Black Museum, 1835-1985: More Dark Secrets From 150 Years of the Most Notorious Crimes in England. London: John Blake Publishing. ISBN 978-1-78418-102-4.
- Innes, Brian (1992). "On the Trail of the Black Panther". Real-life Crimes. Vol. 1, no. 3. Eaglemoss Publications Ltd. ISBN 978-1-856-29732-5.
- Lane, Brian (1995) [1993]. Chronicle of 20th Century Murder. Wiltshire: Select Editions. ISBN 978-0-425-14649-1.
- Lane, Brian (1991). The Murder Guide to Great Britain. London: Robinson Publishing Ltd. ISBN 978-1-845-02937-1.
- Lowe, Gordon (2016). The Black Panther: The Trials and Abductions of Donald Neilson. Stroud: History Press. ISBN 978-0-750-96966-6.
- Nash, Jay (1992). World Encyclopedia of 20th Century Murder. London: Chambers Publishing. ISBN 978-1-5577-8506-0.
- Vandome, Nick (1992). Crimes and Criminals. Edinburgh: Neil Wilson Publishing Ltd. ISBN 978-0-550-17012-5.
- Whittington-Egan, Richard; Whittington-Egan, Molly (1992). The Murder Almanac. Glasgow: Neil Wilson Publishing Ltd. ISBN 978-1-897-78404-4.
- Wier, Nigel (2011). British Serial Killers. Bloomington, Indiana: House Publishing Ltd. ISBN 978-1-467-88139-5.
- Wilson, Colin (ed.). "Murder in Mind – Donald Neilson". Murder in Mind (18). London: Marshall Cavendish. ISSN 1364-5803.
- Wilson, Colin; Seaman, Donald (1988) [1983]. Encyclopedia of Modern Murder: 1962-1982. Prineville, Oregon: Bonanza Books. ISBN 978-0-517-66559-6.
- Wynn, Douglas (1996). On Trial for Murder. London: Pan Books. pp. 242–245. ISBN 978-0-09-472990-2.
