= Severn Valley (disambiguation) =

Severn Valley could be

- The Severn Valley (England) in Shropshire, English Midlands (UK)
- The Severn Valley Country Park in Shropshire, English Midlands (UK)
- The fictional Severn Valley (Cthulhu Mythos)
