= Severn Valley =

Valley in the West Midlands region, England

Coordinates: 52°30′N 2°20′W

Severn Valley shown within the United Kingdom
(grid reference SO750840)

The Severn Valley is a rural area of the West Midlands region of England, through which the River Severn runs and the Severn Valley Railway steam heritage line operates, starting at its northernmost point in Bridgnorth, Shropshire and running south for 16 miles (26 km) to Ribbesford, a few miles south of Bewdley, Worcestershire in the Wyre Forest.

The area is about 25 miles (40 km) due west of Birmingham.

There is also use of this term to apply to areas around the River Severn as far south as Gloucester, and as far north as Ironbridge. To the north of Bridgnorth, the land to the sides of the river becomes much steeper, and the upstream part is known as Ironbridge Gorge. From Stourport-on-Severn south to Gloucester, the riverside has a much larger flood plain and loses its distinctive "valley" hillsides found a few miles north in Bewdley. To the south of Gloucester, it becomes the Vale of Berkeley and then the Severn Estuary.

== History ==
The Severn Valley was under the rule of Ceawlin of Wessex after the Battle of Deorham in 577 AD as part of the Kingdom of Hwicce. In 628 AD, Penda of Mercia's victory in the Battle of Cirencester led to his rule over the Severn Valley.

== Geology and roads ==
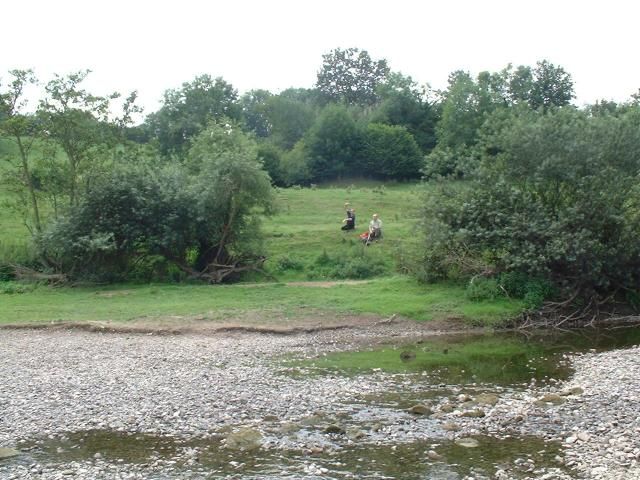
The Severn Valley between Highley and Arley

The area is typified by a substantial river bed with deep fast-flowing channels, surrounded by a small flood plain and rolling wooded hills. Due to the soft sandstone banks, it is difficult to build bridges that can bear heavy loads. The only public road bridges are at Bridgnorth and Bewdley, meaning that there is no way for road traffic to cross the river for 16 miles(26 km). The two main roads along the valley are the A442 on the east side from Bridgnorth via Alveley to Kidderminster and the B4555 on the west from Bridgnorth via Highley to Bewdley. Both of these run north-south roughly parallel with the river.

== Towns and villages ==
Starting north at Bridgnorth and running south downstream, the area encompasses the following locations:

- Through Shropshire:

- Bridgnorth (both sides – two public road bridges)
- Quatford (east bank)
- Chelmarsh (west bank – also private waterworks bridge to Hampton Loade)
- Quatt (east bank)
- Hampton (west bank) and Hampton Loade (east bank) (connected by the Hampton Loade Ferry — also private waterworks utility bridge to Chelmarsh capable of carrying light trucks and small emergency vehicles; gated and usually locked)
- Alveley (east bank – public bridalway/footbridge to Highley)
- Highley (west bank – public bridalway/footbridge to Alveley)

- Through Worcestershire:

- Arley (both sides – public footbridge – also railway bridge for SVR)
- Trimpley (west bank – river enters Wyre Forest — also private waterworks, electricity and gas pipeline bridge)
- Bewdley (both sides – two public road bridges – severe flooding used to be common in spring before defences)

Some definitions continue through Worcestershire and into Gloucestershire as far south as Gloucester.

== Features ==
There are riverside footpaths throughout almost the entire length of the Severn Valley on both sides, including the Severn Way long distance footpath, making it a popular haunt for anglers and ramblers, often combining a leisurely walk with a return trip on the Severn Valley Railway. A number of traditional pubs cater for the tourist trade.

At the centre of the area, between Highley and Alveley, is the Severn Valley Country Park, with level-access and wide flat footpaths for wheelchair users, plus conveniences and a small visitors' centre.

During periods of low water (typically August), fording the river is occasionally possible at almost any point along the Severn Valley, notably near the old bridges at Bridgnorth and Bewdley, and at the appropriately named Quatford. At mid and high water, fording is dangerous due to deep, fast-flowing and often non-visible river channels. Forders are advised to test depth with a long stick as they progress.

== See also ==
- Severn Valley for other uses of Severn Valley
