= Marjorie Yates =

British actress (born 1941)

- Born: 13 April 1941 (age 85); Birmingham, West Midlands, England
- Occupation: Actress
- Years active: 1970–present
- Spouse: Michael Freeman (m. 1967, divorced)
- Children: 2

Marjorie Yates (born 13 April 1941) is a British actress best known for her role as Carol Fisher in the Channel 4 drama Shameless.

== Early life ==
Yates was born in Birmingham, West Midlands, and studied at the Bournville College of Art.

== Career ==
An early TV role for Yates was in Colin Welland's Play for Today (Kisses At Fifty, BBC, 1972) alongside Bill Maynard, and she went on to feature in several BBC's single play strands, including other episodes of Play for Today: Better Than The Movies (1972), The Bouncing Boy (1972), A Helping Hand (1975), Daft Mam Blues (1977), Marya (1979), The Other Side (1979)', Pasmore (1980), Alan Bennett's Marks (1982) and June (1990). Other roles followed, with a part in Putting on the Agony (Granada, 1973) in which she had the lead role as Marilyn.

The role was followed throughout the 1970s with minor parts in a number of television productions, including Z-Cars and The Brothers in 1974, and The Sweeney in 1976. She continued her acting career on stage and television throughout the 1980s and 1990s, including small parts in Great Expectations, Boon, The Ruth Rendell Mysteries, Village Hall, Crown Court the BBC's 1984 series Morgan's Boy, Wycliffe, Underbelly (1990) and a leading role in A Very British Coup.

Her film roles include the children's mother in The Optimists of Nine Elms (1973) with Peter Sellers; Vault Of Horror (1973); Legend of the Werewolf (1975); The Glitterball (1977); as the wife of Donald Neilson in the crime film The Black Panther (1977), Priest of Love (1981), Wetherby (1985) and Dead Man's Folly (1986).

She also featured alongside David Swift in Couples, a long running, twice weekly daytime drama on ITV about a marriage guidance counselling service.

Yates appeared in the Terence Davies film The Long Day Closes (1992). She has had parts in Where the Heart Is in 1997 and Heartbeat in 2000. She has also appeared in The Bill, in 1990, 1996, and twice in 2002.

In 2001, Yates appeared on stage in London's West End in Noël Coward's Star Quality, playing opposite Penelope Keith and Una Stubbs.

She was initially cast in a small role for the Channel 4 comedy drama Shameless playing the role of Carol Fisher, mother of Veronica Ball (Maxine Peake) in 2004, originally for one episode. After a minor role in No Angels, Yates was invited back to Shameless on a permanent basis. She starred as Carol from series 2 in December 2004 to the end of series 4 in February 2007. She left after three series, when it was decided to write out the Fishers from the programme in 2006, following the departure of Peake.

Her radio performances include BBC Radio 4's Untold Secrets (1995); Sonya And Leo (2002); Playing the Salesman (2006); a recurring role throughout 2008 in The Archers; and BBC Radio 3's Sunday Play: Walk to the Paradise Garden in 2001.

Yates has since been working in theatre. She appeared in the BBC series Casualty as Val Barnaby in the episode "The things we do for..."', broadcast in July 2008.

In January 2010, it was announced that Yates would once again team up with former Shameless co-star Maxine Peake in the film Edge. Filming began that same month.

In 2022, Yates appeared as Hazel in the film adaptation of Alan Bennett's play Allelujah.

== Personal life ==
Yates was married for a time to Michael Freeman, a former parliamentary candidate for the Labour Party in Finchley who came second to future prime minister Margaret Thatcher at the 1970 general election; he was subsequently a Labour councillor on Barnet London Borough Council. They had two children, but divorced in the 1980s.
