= The Black Panther (1977 film) =

1977 British film by Ian Merrick

- Theatrical release poster
- Directed by: Ian Merrick
- Written by: Michael Armstrong
- Produced by: Ian Merrick
- Starring: Donald Sumpter; Debbie Farrington; Marjorie Yates
- Cinematography: Joseph Mangine
- Edited by: Teddy Darvas
- Music by: Richard Arnell
- Production company: Impics Productions
- Distributed by: Alpha Films
- Release date: 26 December 1977
- Running time: 102 minutes
- Country: United Kingdom
- Language: English

The Black Panther is a 1977 British crime film directed and produced by Ian Merrick, his first feature, and stars Donald Sumpter, Debbie Farrington and Marjorie Yates. Its subject is the real life ex-military criminal Donald Neilson, known as the "Black Panther".

== Plot ==
The story begins with Neilson's robbery at Heywood Post Office in Greater Manchester on 16 February 1972. Neilson loses his black-hooded mask after a fight with the owner, but manages to escape. He later travels home to his wife and teenaged daughter, who are unaware of his criminal activity. Neilson is a strict family man, expecting complete obedience from his wife and daughter, while planning his next robberies and future kidnapping. On 15 February 1974, Neilson robs the Post Office in New Park, shooting the sub-postmaster in the process. A reward in set for Neilson at £5,000. While collecting newspaper articles on his activities, Neilson reminisces on his time in the army, and prepares for the kidnapping of the wealthy heiress Lesley Whittle. He robs the Post Office at Higher Baxenden in Lancashire on 6 September 1974, where he shoots the owner. He is seen scurrying away over rooftops by witnesses, and becomes known as The Black Panther, due to his black hood, and ability to disappear into the night. On 11 November, he robs Langley Post Office, shooting both clerks in the process. The press now regards him as public enemy number one.

On 14 January 1975, Neilson travels to Highley, Shropshire and kidnaps Lesley Whittle from her bed. He drives her to Bathpool Park in Kidsgrove, Staffordshire, where he takes her sixty feet underground into a reservoir drainage shaft system. He puts her on a narrow ledge, with food and drink, so nobody can hear or find her. He tightens a steel ligature around her neck to stop her escaping while he is away arranging the ransom. The Whittle family decide to inform the police after discovering Neilson's ransom note in the house. His demand is for £50,000.

After two failed attempts at communication, and another shooting by Neilson, Lesley's brother Ronald receives instructions on where to deliver the ransom. He is to drive to Bathpool Park where he is to look out for a flashing light. Ronald gets lost in the dark and cannot find Bathpool Park. In the confusion, Neilson becomes paranoid and angry, and goes back to Lesley. She falls from the ledge and dies, although it is not clear how it happens. On 23 January, the car which Neilson stole earlier is found abandoned. After the discovery, the police manage to link the kidnapping with the Black Panther killings. On 7 March, Lesley's body is found in Bathpool Park, and on 11 December 1975, Neilson is apprehended by two police officers after threatening them with a shotgun.

== Cast ==
- Donald Sumpter as Donald Neilson
- Debbie Farrington as Lesley Whittle
- Marjorie Yates as Neilson's wife
- Sylvia O'Donnell as Neilson's daughter
- Andrew Burt as Lesley's brother
- Alison Key as Lesley's sister-In-Law
- Ruth Dunning as Lesley's mother
- David Swift as Detective Chief Superintendent
- Michael Barrington
- Barbara New
- Peter Copley
- Brenda Cowling
- Paul Luty as Night Watchman
- Edwin Apps

== Release ==
The film was highly controversial on its release, regarded as deeply exploitative as it was released only a few years after the occurrence of the real life events. It was slated by media figures such as Sue Lawley of Tonight. Subsequently, the film was effectively banned from viewing. The First Video Release was by Intervision in 1981 has a Pre-Cert, Later in 1986 AVR Home Entertainment Re Release the film In 2012, the film was remastered and resurrected into the British Film Institute Archives and Hall of Fame, as an important British film to rave reviews.

=== Reception ===
John Patterson of The Guardian commented that The Black Panther "emerges as a meticulous, tactful, well made and highly responsible true crime movie".

=== Home media ===
The film was released by the BFI as a combined DVD and Blu-Ray package in 2012.

== Bibliography ==
- Chibnall, Steve & Petley, Julian. British Horror Cinema. Routledge, 2002.
