= Coton, Alveley, Shropshire =

Coordinates: 52.477°N 2.336°W

Coton
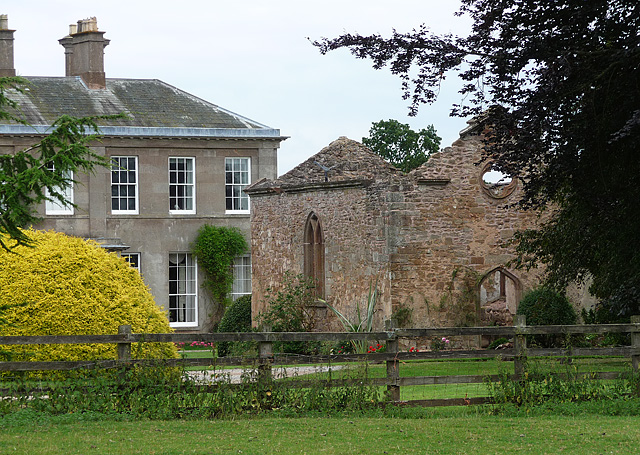
- Coton Hall and former chapel

- Location within Shropshire
- OS grid reference: SO771866
- Civil parish: Alveley
- Unitary authority: Shropshire
- Ceremonial county: Shropshire
- Region: West Midlands
- Country: England
- Sovereign state: United Kingdom
- Post town: BRIDGNORTH
- Postcode district: WV15
- Dialling code: 01746
- Police: West Mercia
- Fire: Shropshire
- Ambulance: West Midlands
- UK Parliament: Ludlow

Coton is located northeast of Alveley, Shropshire and was associated with the manor Coton Hall. The ancestors of General Robert E. Lee left Coton near Alveley during the 17th century. At that time the Lee family had been there for some six centuries, and another branch of the Lee family remained in Coton until 1821.

== See also ==
- Listed buildings in Alveley
