= City of Wolverhampton College =

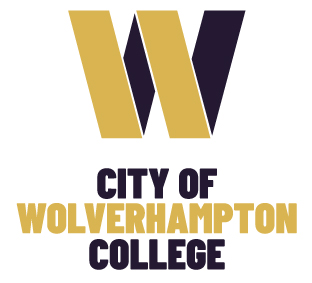

Location
- St. George's Parade; Wolverhampton, West Midlands, WV2 1AZ; England

Information
- Type: Further Education
- Established: 1962
- Local authority: Wolverhampton City Council
- Department for Education URN: 130484 Tables
- Ofsted: Reports
- Principal: Ms Louise Fall
- Gender: Mixed
- Age: 16+
- Telephone: 01902 836000
- Website: http://www.wolvcoll.ac.uk

City of Wolverhampton College is a further education college located in Wolverhampton, West Midlands, England.

== History ==
The college was formed in September 1999 as the result of a merger of Wulfrun College in Wolverhampton and Bilston Community College in Bilston.

Upon this merger, it was initially known as Wolverhampton College, but in the aftermath of Wolverhampton gaining city status in December 2000, it adopted its current title.

A campus has since opened on Wellington Road in Bilston, replacing the old Bilston Community College buildings nearby which had originally been the buildings of Bilston Girls High School.

The college offers courses to students from Wolverhampton and the surrounding area. Courses offered include NVQs, GCSEs, BTECs, A Levels and Access courses. In addition, the college offers some higher education courses in conjunction with the University of Wolverhampton.

== Campuses ==
- Wellington Road Campus, Wellington Road, Bilston (52.5737°N 2.0922°W)
- City Learning Quarter, Bilston Street, Wolverhampton (52.5838°N 2.1245°W)
- Telford Campus, Stafford Park 4, Telford, Shropshire (52.6759°N 2.4222°W)

The Paget Road site closed in 2025 with students transferring to an expanded Metro One Campus coined "The City Learning Quarter".

Worcester Campus previously located 9-11 Copenhagen Street, Worcester, WR1 2HB, is no longer listed.

== Notable students ==
- Liam Payne, X Factor finalist and member of boyband One Direction. Payne studied Music Technology at the college.
- Sam Gumbley, known professionally as S-X, producer and singer. Gumbley studied Music Technology at the college.
- Garry Crawford, Professor of Sociology and author, University of Salford
- Lesley Whittle was a student at the college when, in 1975, she was kidnapped and murdered by Donald Neilson in one of the most notorious crimes of the 1970s.
