= Philip Joseph Cox =

British officer (1922–2014)

Philip Joseph Cox, DSC, QC (28 September 1922 – 14 November 2014) was a British Royal Navy officer of the Second World War who was awarded the Distinguished Service Cross for his actions against enemy submarines. He later became a leading Barrister on the Birmingham circuit, becoming a Queen's Counsel and judge.

Cox was the prosecuting counsel in the Donald Nielson "black panther" case of 1975 and the 1978 "Bridgwater four" case, securing convictions in both, though the later conviction was quashed after the police were shown to have falsified evidence.

== Arms ==
Coat of arms of Philip Joseph Cox
Notes Displayed on a painted panel at Gray's Inn. Crest A demi bear Sable holding between the forepaws a cranse iron Or. Escutcheon Azure a cavity magnetron Argent between in chief two griffins’ heads erased Or.
