= Little London, Shropshire =

Little London is the name of two hamlets in Shropshire, England.

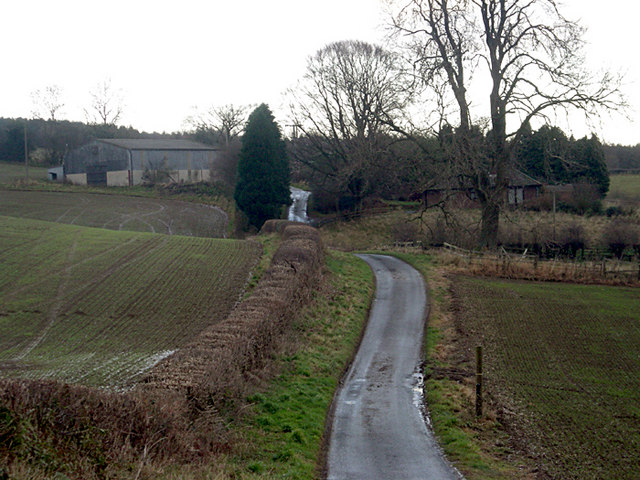
Little London, near Munslow, in winter

One hamlet is situated near Alveley. It borders with Arley, Worcestershire and its partial woodland forms the outskirts of the Wyre Forest. This Little London sits on an unclassified road which forms part of the access route to Alveley Country Park.

The other hamlet is situated near Munslow (and in that parish), between the Corvedale and Wenlock Edge. It is a dispersed settlement in remote, hilly countryside.
