= Listed buildings in Highley =

Highley is a civil parish in Shropshire, England. It contains 13 listed buildings that are recorded in the National Heritage List for England. Of these, one is at Grade II*, the middle of the three grades, and the others are at Grade II, the lowest grade. The parish contains the village of Highley and the surrounding countryside. Most of the listed buildings are houses and farmhouses, many of which are timber framed. The other listed buildings are a church, the remains of a cross in the churchyard, two bridges, and a war memorial.

== Key ==
Grade	Criteria
II*	Particularly important buildings of more than special interest
II	Buildings of national importance and special interest

== Buildings ==
Name and location	Photograph	Date	Notes	Grade
St Mary's Church; 52.44674°N 2.38228°W		Early 12th century	The church was altered in about 1500, restored in 1880–81 by S. Pountney Smith, the vestry was added in 1903 and the pinnacles in 1907. The church is built in buff and red sandstone, and consists of a nave, a south porch, a chancel, a north vestry, and a west tower. The tower has three stages, diagonal buttresses, a four-light west window, an embattled parapet and corner pinnacles. The nave and chancel are Norman, and the tower is Perpendicular.	II*
Churchyard cross 52.44676°N 2.38204°W	—	Late medieval	The remains of the cross are in the churchyard of St Mary's Church. It is in stone on three square steps, and has an elaborately carved base, with heads at the corners, moulding at the top, and a crocketed niche on the east side. The shaft is octagonal.	II
Church House; 52.44663°N 2.38258°W		16th century	The house was altered at the rear in the 18th century. It is timber framed with infill in brick and plaster, and roughcast at the rear. The house has two storeys, a hall range and a gabled cross-wing. The upper floor and the gable are jettied, the latter supported by buttresses and corner brackets, and with a moulded bressumer. The windows are casements, and there are blocked oriel windows.	II
The Manor House; 52.44558°N 2.38049°W		Mid to late 16th century	A farmhouse, later a private house, a gabled cross-wing was added in the early 17th century, and a single storey extension was added to the rear in about 1980. The house is timber framed with brick infill and has a tile roof. There are two storeys, and it contains casement windows. The upper floor of the gable end is jettied and has a moulded bressumer.	II
Woodend; 52.45807°N 2.38199°W	—	Late 16th century (probable)	A farmhouse that is partly timber framed, and partly in brick and stone, and with a tile roof. There are two storeys and three bays, and the windows are casements.	II
The Birches; 52.45303°N 2.38190°W	—	c. 1620	A vicarage, later a private house, it was altered and extended in about 1750, and again later. The house is timber framed, largely rendered, with rebuilding in brick at the rear, and with a tile roof. There are two storeys and a basement, and a cruciform plan. The two-storey porch and an end gable are jettied, both with moulded bressumers. The windows vary, and include mullioned and transomed windows, sashes, casements, and lunettes, and there is a two-storey canted bay window.	II
Horseshoes; 52.44371°N 2.38995°W	—	17th century	A timber framed house with brick infill and a tile roof. It has an L-shaped plan, two storeys and three bays, and the windows are casements.	II
Oak Cottage; 52.44661°N 2.38050°W	—	17th century (probable)	The cottage is timber framed with brick infill and a tile roof. It has one storey and an attic, one bay, and a casement window.	II
Borlemill Bridge; 52.44133°N 2.39415°W		Late 18th century (probable)	The bridge carries a road over the Borle Brook. It is in stone and consists of a single segmental arch. The bridge has keyblocks and plain parapets.	II
Hazelwells; 52.45758°N 2.38452°W	—	Early 19th century	A stone farmhouse with a hipped slate roof, two storeys and five bays. The central bay projects forward and has a pediment containing an oeil-de-boeuf window. The other windows are sashes with bracketed hoods, and in the centre is a porch with Doric pillars.	II
Rhea Hall Farm House; 52.45281°N 2.37805°W	—	Early 19th century	The farmhouse is in stuccoed stone, and has moulded wooden eaves, a slate roof, and two storeys. The doorway has Doric pilasters, a segmental fanlight and an open pediment, and the windows are sashes.	II
Footbridge over Borle Brook; 52.43220°N 2.36469°W		1828	The footbridge crosses the Borle Brook near its junction with the River Severn. It is in cast iron with sandstone abutments, and consists of a single elliptical arch. The spandrels are filled with circles, the balustrades have an elongated diamond pattern, and the abutments have string courses and parapets.	II
War memorial 52.44666°N 2.38172°W	—	1921	The war memorial is in the churchyard of St Mary's Church. It is in sandstone with a wheel head in the style of a Celtic cross. The memorial has a tapering shaft on a rusticated base on a stepped platform. On the shaft is a carved sword and an inscription, and on the base is a limestone plaque with an inscription and the names of those lost in the First World War. On the east side is an inscription relating to the Second World War and the names of those lost.	II
