= Listed buildings in Alveley =

Alveley is a civil parish in Shropshire, England. It contains 32 listed buildings that are recorded in the National Heritage List for England. Of these, three are listed at Grade II*, the middle grade of the three grades, and the others are at Grade II, the lowest grade. The parish contains the village of Alvley and the settlements of Coton, Kingsnordley, and Tuck Hill, and is otherwise rural. Many of the listed buildings are in the village, clustered around the church, and others are scattered through the countryside. Most of the listed buildings are country houses, smaller houses and cottages, farmhouses and farm buildings, and associated structures. The other listed buildings include churches and items in and around churchyards, public houses, crosses, and a disused chapel.

== Key ==
Grade	Criteria
II*	Particularly important buildings of more than special interest
II	Buildings of national importance and special interest

== Buildings ==
Name and location	Photograph	Date	Notes	Grade
St Mary's Church; 52.45831°N 2.35529°W		12th century	The oldest parts of the church are the lower parts of the tower, nave and aisles, the chancel dates from the 13th century, the south aisle was remodelled in 1353, the tower was rebuilt in 1779, and the church was restored in 1878–79 by Arthur Blomfield who also added the porch. The older parts of the church are built in tufa, and the later parts in sandstone. The church consists of a nave with a clerestory, north and south aisles, a south porch, a south chapel, a chancel, and a west porch. The tower, aisles, chapel, and nave have embattled parapets.	II*
Kingsnordley Farm House; 52.48752°N 2.33535°W		16th century (probable)	There have been alterations and extensions to the farmhouse, which is in stone with tiled roofs. It has two storeys, an L-shaped plan, and a front of three bays. The windows are a mix of sashes and casements. There are two canted bay windows, and the doorway has a wood bracketed hood.	II
The Bell Inn; 52.45831°N 2.35436°W		Early 17th century	At one time a public house, later a private house, it is timber framed with a rendered exterior, with brick at one end, and a tiled roof. There is one storey with an attic, three bays, and a lean-to and an extension at the rear. On the front is a canted bay window, and in the roof is a half-dormer. Re-set into the walls are 12th-century carved panels.	II*
7 Centre Place; 52.45786°N 2.35454°W		17th century	The ground floor of the house is in stone, the upper floor is timber framed with brick infill, and the roof is tiled. There are two storeys and two bays. The windows are casements, and the doorway has a small gabled hood on brackets.	II
Beautybank; 52.47456°N 2.30579°W		17th century	The original part of the house is timber framed, and a brick wing was added later. It has a tiled roof, two storeys and an attic, and the windows are casements.	II
Church Cottages; 52.45802°N 2.35500°W		17th century	The building was extended in the 18th century and later to become three dwellings, and subsequently combined into one. It is in brick with dentil eaves and a tiled roof. There are two storeys and an L-shaped plan. The upper floor of the left wing is timber framed, and the windows are sashes.	II
Hall Close; 52.45214°N 2.35347°W	—	17th century	The house is partly timber framed and partly in brick, and has a tiled roof. There are two storeys, four bays, and a later wing on the right. The windows are a mix of sashes, and casements with Gothic tracery.	II
Barn, Hall Close; 52.45251°N 2.35420°W	—	17th century (probable)	The barn is to the north of the house. It is partly timber framed and partly in brick, and has a tiled roof. The openings are plain.	II
Kingsnordley; 52.48846°N 2.33187°W		17th century	Originally a farmhouse, later altered to become two cottages at right angles to each other. They are partly timber framed and partly in brick, with tiled roofs. They have two storeys, and the windows are casements.	II
Lake House; 52.46968°N 2.35374°W		17th century	The house has subsequently been extended and altered. It is partly timber framed, and partly in brick with a tiled roof. The timber framed part has two storeys and casement windows, and the brick part has two storeys with an attic, three bays, and sash windows.	II
Three Horseshoes Inn; 52.45727°N 2.35464°W		17th century (probable)	The public house has a timber framed core, and it was largely rebuilt in the 19th century. On the south side is a large chimney breast.	II
Elm Cottage; 52.45752°N 2.35507°W		1672	The house has been restored and the windows replaced. It is roughcast with a tiled roof, two storeys, and three bays. The central doorway has a gabled hood, and the windows are modern metal casements.	II
The Chantry; 52.45780°N 2.35491°W		1706	The house consists of two wings at right angles, the older in stone, the later, dated 1725, in brick, both ranges with tiled roofs. The older range has two storeys, a coped gable, a central doorway, and casement windows. The later part has two bays, a band, two storeys with dormers, a central square-headed doorway with a gabled hood, and casement windows with diamond glazing and keyed lintels. Both parts have datestones.	II
Pool Hall; 52.45102°N 2.34319°W		Early 18th century	A country house in red brick with quoins, pilaster strips, two moulded bands, parapet coping, and a tiled roof. There are three storeys and five bays. In the centre is a two-storey projecting stone porch with fluted Roman Doric pilasters, a moulded cornice, and a balustraded parapet. The windows are sashes with lintels and raised keyblocks. At the rear are three gables and mullioned and transomed windows from the incorporation of earlier material. In front of the house is a walled forecourt with stone gate piers.	II*
16 and 17 Centre Place; 52.45765°N 2.35467°W		18th century (probable)	A pair of roughcast cottages with a tile roof. They have one storey and attics. The doorways have small gabled hoods, the windows are casements, and there are two gabled dormers in No. 16.	II
141–142 Tuck Hill; 52.48970°N 2.31585°W	—	c. Mid 18th century	A pair of stone houses that were extended in brick in the 19th century. They have tiled roofs, two storeys, and a symmetrical front of three bays, with a single-storey extension at both ends. The windows are casements.	II
Church View; 52.45754°N 2.35539°W	—	18th century (probable)	A stone house with a tiled roof, it has two storeys and three bays, the left bay gabled. On the front is a gabled wooden porch. The windows are casements; the windows in the ground floor and the upper floor in the gable have segmental heads.	II
Chapel, Coton Hall; 52.47438°N 2.33500°W		c. 1760	The chapel is in stone and without a roof. It has a moulded eaves cornice. The east window is in Venetian style, the centre light having an ogee head, other windows have pointed heads and contain Y-tracery, and in the west gable is a quatrefoil opening. Inside is the baluster shaft of an 18th-century font.	II
Outbuilding and wall, The Bell Inn; 52.45836°N 2.35455°W		Late 18th century	The outbuilding is in sandstone with a tiled roof. It has two storeys and there is an outshut to the south. Openings include casement windows, cross-windows, and a first-floor loft doorway. To the northeast is a sandstone wall with rounded coping.	II
19–21 Centre Place; 52.45742°N 2.35455°W		18th or 19th century	A row of three sandstone cottages with a tiled roof. There are two storeys and a front of four bays. The windows are casements, and the door has a gabled hood.	II
50–53 Ivy Place; 52.45597°N 2.35346°W		18th or 19th century	A row of four sandstone cottages with a tiled roof. They have two storeys and each cottage has two bays. Each cottage has a doorway with a moulded ledge hood on brackets, and the windows are casements.	II
Privy and walls, The Bell Inn; 52.45831°N 2.35394°W	—	Late 18th or early 19th century	The privy and walls are in sandstone. The privy has a lean-to roof of corrugated iron, and a door with a lintel of probably re-used 12th-century material. The walls have rounded coping. The east wall is about 10 metres (33 ft) and the south wall about 43 metres (141 ft), and they probably incorporate re-set 12th-century material.	II
Walls, The Bell Inn; 52.45827°N 2.35459°W	—	Late 18th or early 19th century	The walls enclose the forecourt to the west of the building, they are in sandstone, and extend for about 10 metres (33 ft) along the north side, and for about 15 metres (49 ft) along the west side. The walls on the south and east sides are lower. Incorporated unto the wall is reset 12th-century stonework consisting of a carved stone in an arcade with pillars that have flat capitals.	II
Church Farm House; 52.45798°N 2.35554°W		Early 19th century	A red brick house with coped gables. There are two storeys with an attic, and three bays. The windows are sashes with segmental heads, and the doorway has a rectangular fanlight and a pedimented hood.	II
Coton Hall; 52.47449°N 2.33455°W		Early 19th century	A country house that was later extended on the left. It is in ashlar stone with a dentilled eaves cornice and slate roofs. The house has an L-shaped plan, two storeys, and the main block has seven bays. On the front is a porch with two pairs of monolithic Doric columns, and the windows are sashes. The left extension contains a low tower with a pyramidal cap.	II
Green House; 52.47269°N 2.34845°W	—	Early 19th century	The core of the house dates from the 17th century. It is in red brick with plain eaves, and a tiled roof with coped gables. There are two storeys and five bays, the outer bays projecting forward and gabled. On the front is a projecting stone porch with an arched opening in each face. The windows are casements with chamfered stone surrounds and hood moulds. At the rear is an initialled and dated stone.	II
Shropshire Farm House; 52.44279°N 2.34499°W	—	Early 19th century	A brick house on a stone plinth with a tiled roof. It has three storeys with an attic, three bays, and a lower rear wing. The windows are sashes with keyblocks, and the doorway has pilasters, an entablature and a rectangular fanlight.	II
Squirrel Inn; 52.46268°N 2.34402°W		Early 19th century	The public house is in brick and has a slate roof with coped gables. There are three storeys and three bays. On the front is a cornice hood porch carried on fluted cast iron columns. The windows are a mix of sashes and casements, those in the middle floor with moulded lintels and keyblocks. In the ground floor are two canted bay windows.	II
Churchyard walls 52.45826°N 2.35468°W		19th century	The walls enclose the churchyard of St Mary's Church. They are in sandstone and have rounded copings. Incorporated in the walls are a wooden gate with a pedimented canopy and a stile with stone steps.	II
Church of Holy Innocents, Tuck Hill; 52.48999°N 2.31421°W		1868–69	The church, designed by James Piers St Aubyn, is built in sandstone, and has a tiled roof with terracotta ridge tiles. It consists of a nave, a south aisle, a south porch, and a chancel with a south vestry. At the west end is a bellcote with a square base, a timber frame with pointed arches, and a copper-clad spirelet.	II
Butter Cross; 52.46898°N 2.36578°W		Undated	This is in stone and consists of a shaft on a circular base with a round head caved with Maltese crosses. It is about 5 feet (1.5 m) high. The cross is also a Scheduled Monument.	II
Churchyard Cross; 52.45818°N 2.35533°W		Undated	The cross is in the churchyard of St Mary's Church. It is in stone, and consists of a truncated shaft on a base, standing on three hexagonal steps.	II
