= Bathpool Park =

Public park in a rural area in Staffordshire near the border with Cheshire

Coordinates: 53.078°N 2.242°W

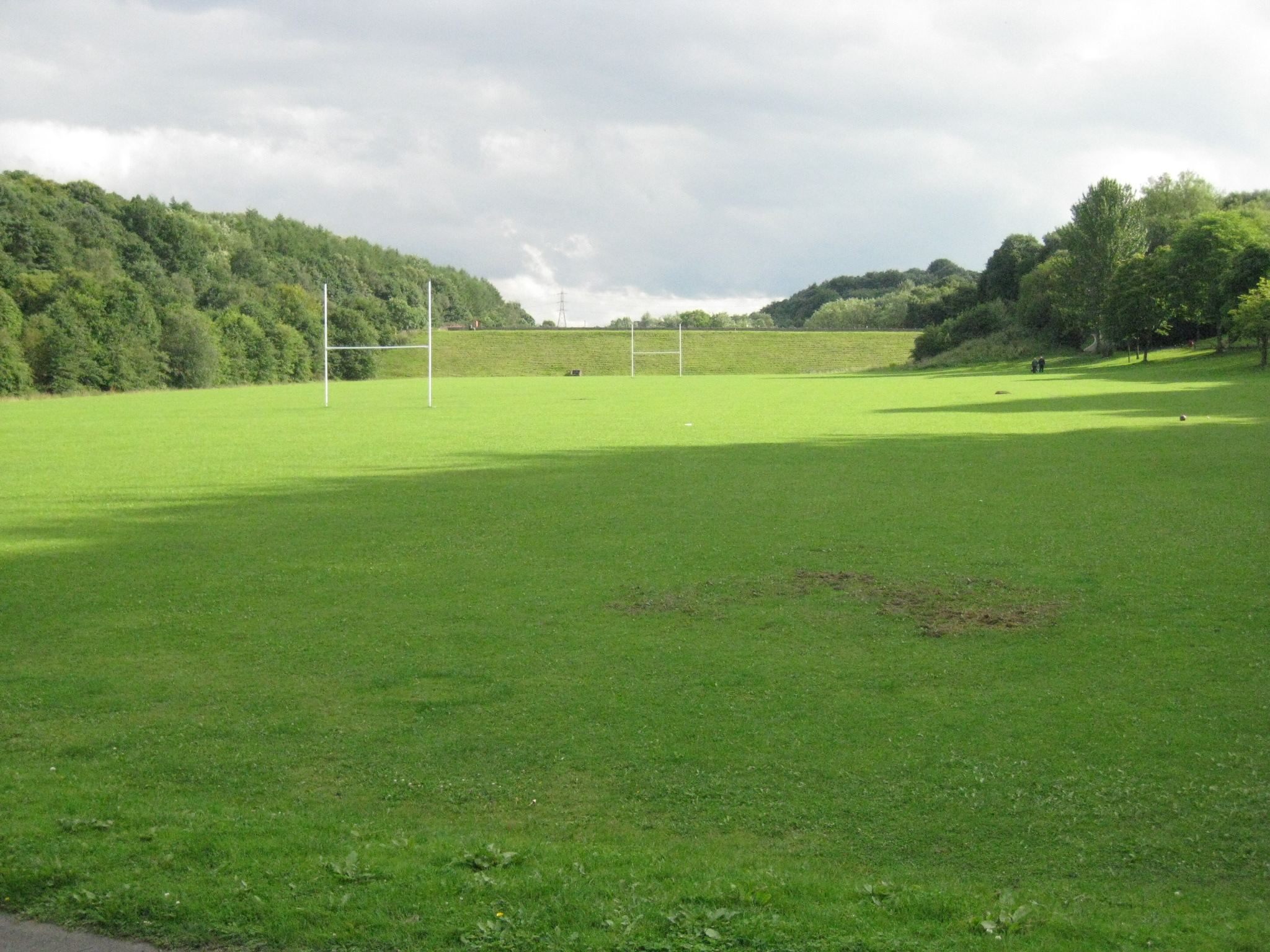
Rugby pitch at Bathpool

Bathpool Park is a public park in a rural area between Newcastle-under-Lyme and Kidsgrove, Staffordshire (near the border with Cheshire). The park became notorious in 1975 as the location for the murder of Lesley Whittle. Whittle's body was found hanging from a steel wire at the bottom of a shaft in the park. She fell or was pushed by a killer known as the Black Panther, Donald Neilson. Neilson was sentenced to life for Whittle's and four other murders, eventually dying as a prisoner in December 2011.

In 1977, a feature film about Whittle's murder, entitled The Black Panther, was released. Parts of the film were shot on location in Bathpool Park.

Bathpool Park is owned and managed by Newcastle-under-Lyme Borough Council.
