= Kingsnordley =

Coordinates: 52.487°N 2.335°W

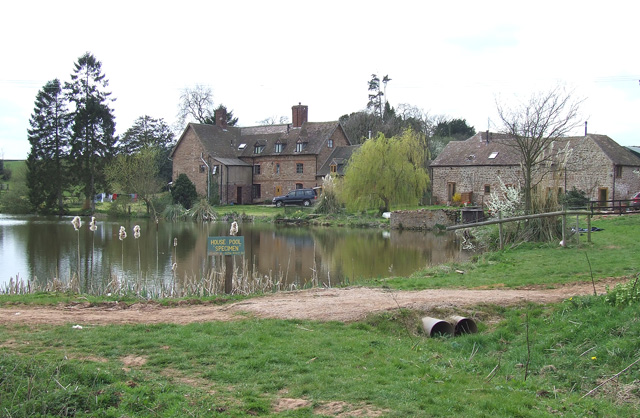
- Kingsnordley Farm

- Location within Shropshire
- OS grid reference: SO772878
- Civil parish: Alveley
- Unitary authority: Shropshire
- Ceremonial county: Shropshire
- Region: West Midlands
- Country: England
- Sovereign state: United Kingdom
- Post town: BRIDGNORTH
- Postcode district: WV15
- Dialling code: 01746
- Police: West Mercia
- Fire: Shropshire
- Ambulance: West Midlands
- UK Parliament: Ludlow

Kingsnordley is a manor in the northern part of the parish of Alveley.

This part of the parish has no nucleated village, but there is a Church of England chapel of ease at Tuckhill.

== See also ==
- Listed buildings in Alveley
