= Donald Sumpter =

English actor (born 1943)

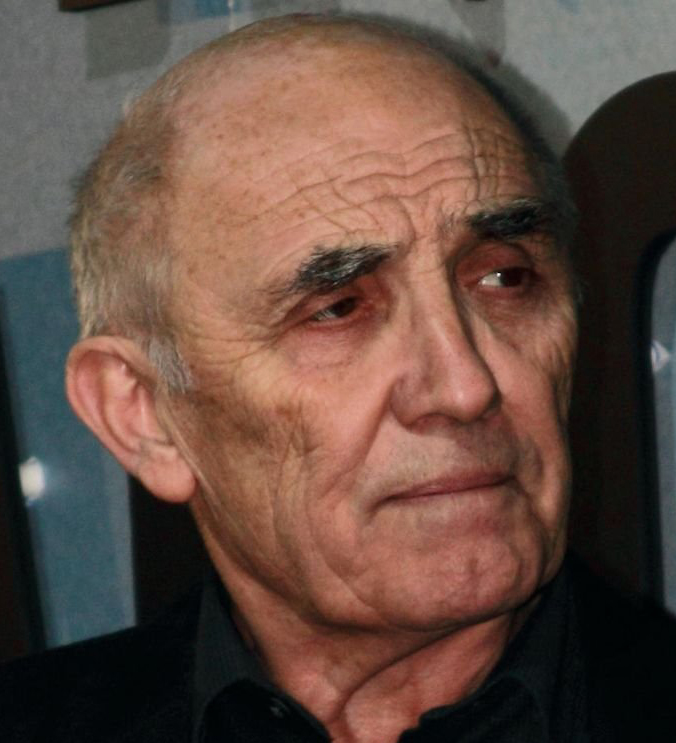
- Sumpter at The Girl with the Dragon Tattoo film premiere in 2012
- Born: 13 February 1943 (age 83); Brixworth, Northamptonshire, England
- Occupation: Actor
- Years active: 1966–present

Donald Sumpter (born 13 February 1943) is a British actor who has appeared in film and television since the mid-1960s. His credits include three appearances in Doctor Who (1968, 1972, 2015), The Black Panther (1977), Bleak House (1985), The Queen's Nose (1995–1998), Great Expectations (1999), Nicholas Nickleby (2001), Enigma (2001), K-19: The Widowmaker (2002), The Constant Gardener (2005), Being Human (2009–2010), Ultramarines: The Movie (2010), Black Mirror (2011), Game of Thrones (2011–2012), Endeavour (2018), Les Misérables (2018), Chernobyl (2019), and The Phoenician Scheme (2025).

== Early life ==
Sumpter was born on 13 February 1943, in Brixworth, Northamptonshire, England.

== Career ==
One of Sumpter's early television appearances was the 1968 Doctor Who serial The Wheel in Space with Patrick Troughton as the Doctor. Sumpter appeared in Doctor Who again, in the 1972 serial The Sea Devils with Jon Pertwee. Sumpter also appeared in the Doctor Who spin-off The Sarah Jane Adventures. In 2015, he appeared as the Time Lord President Rassilon in the Doctor Who episode "Hell Bent".

His early film work included a lead role as real life criminal Donald Neilson in the 1977 film The Black Panther. Sumpter also appeared in many television films and serials, including adaptations of Dickens' novels: Nicholas Nickleby in 2001, Great Expectations in 1999, and Bleak House in 1985.

Sumpter played the part of villain Ronnie Day in Big Deal (1985). He took the role of Alexander Bonaparte Cust in the 1992 Agatha Christie's Poirot adaptation of The ABC Murders. He has also appeared in episodes of Midsomer Murders, The Bill, Holby City, Black Mirror, and A Touch of Frost.

From 1995 to 1998, Sumpter had a recurring role as Uncle Ginger in the Children's BBC series The Queen's Nose. He played Harold Chapple in Our Friends in the North, and portrayed the physicist Max Planck in Einstein and Eddington. He has also been seen as Kemp in the horror-drama series Being Human. In seasons 1 and 2, he portrayed Maester Luwin in the HBO series Game of Thrones.

His film appearances include The Constant Gardener (2005), K-19: The Widowmaker (2002), Enigma (2001) and Ultramarines: The Movie (2010).

In 2018, he played film star Emil Valdemar in Endeavour, Series 5, Episode 2: "Cartouche. The same year, he appeared as Monsieur Mabeuf in the BBC adaption of Les Misérables.

== Filmography ==
=== Films ===
Year	Title	Role	Notes
1968	The Window Cleaner	David	
1968	The Lost Continent	Sparks – the radioman	Uncredited
1969	Night After Night After Night	Pete Laver	
1970	Groupie Girl	Steve	
1970	The Walking Stick	Max	
1971	Bleak Moments	Norman's friend	
1971	Sunday Bloody Sunday	Party Guest	
1974	Stardust	TV Producer	
1977	Hardcore	Mark	
1977	The Black Panther	Donald Neilson	
1979	Meetings with Remarkable Men	Pogossian	
1983	Curse of the Pink Panther	Dave	
1990	Rosencrantz and Guildenstern are Dead	Claudius	
1992	Méchant garçon	Michael, le père	
1993	Being Human	Salgedo	as Don Sumpter
1995	Richard III	Brackenbury	
1997	Tangier Cop	Ahmed Yaasin	
2001	Enigma	Leveret	
2001	The Point Men	Benni Baum	
2002	K-19: The Widowmaker	Gennadi Savran	
2005	The Constant Gardener	Tim Donohue	
2007	Eastern Promises	Yuri	
2009	God & Lucy	God	Short film
2010	Among Us	Man on bench	
2010	Ultramarines: The Movie	Pythol	Voice role
2011	The Girl with the Dragon Tattoo	Detective Inspector Gustaf Morell	
2014	Bypass	Grandfather	
2015	In the Heart of the Sea	Paul Macy	
2016	The Knackerman	Ron	Short film
2017	The Man Who Invented Christmas	Jacob Marley	
2024	Limonov: The Ballad	Eddie's Father	
2025	The Phoenician Scheme	Chairman	

=== Television ===
Year	Title	Role	Notes
1966	The Wednesday Play	Soldier	1 episode: "A Hero of Our Time"
1967	Softly Softly	Ted Reece	1 episode: "Ted Reece"
1967	Love Story		1 episode: "Cinéma Vérité"
1967	Z-Cars	Dave Caller	2 episodes: "It's Easy Once You Know How"
1968	Doctor Who	Enrico Casali	6 episodes: "The Wheel in Space"
1968	Sanctuary	Lee	1 episode: "The Girl with the Blue Guitar"
1969	ITV Saturday Night Theatre	Leary	1 episode: "Pig in a Poke"
1969	The First Churchills	Lord Cutts	1 episode: "A Famous Victory"
1970	Mad Jack	Wilmot	
1970	The Adventures of Don Quick	Gezool	1 episode: "The Benefits of Earth"
1972	Doctor Who	Commander Ridgeway	3 episodes: "The Sea Devils"
1972	Armchair Theatre	Dellow	1 episode: "The Breaking of Colonel Keyser"
1973	Barlow at Large	Jim Page	1 episode: "Strays"
1973	Hadleigh	Tony	
1975	Centre Play	Johnny	1 episode: "The Saliva Milkshake"
1975	Sadie, It's Cold Outside	Plumber	1 episode
1975	Quiller	Hudson	1 episode: "Assault on the Ritz"
1975	Softly, Softly: Task Force	George Hartley	1 episode: "Choirboy"
1977	Jesus of Nazareth	Aram	
1977	Seven Faces of Woman	Joe Belladona	1 episode: "She: Anxious Anne"
1977	Play for Today	Spalding	1 episode: "Catchpenny Twist"
1977	The Children of the New Forest	Ned Corbould	
1978	Crown Court	George Grainger	1 episode: "To Catch a Thief"
1978	Target	Heslop	1 episode: "Promises"
1978	Les Misérables	Agent	
1979	The Other Side	John Olinsky	1 episode: "Contact"
1980	Shoestring	Stanley Reeves	1 episode: "The Teddy Bears’ Nightmare"
1981	BBC Television Shakespeare	Sextus Pompeius	"Antony & Cleopatra"
1981	The Rose Medallion	Harry	
1982	The Brack Report	Paul Brack	
1983	Bergerac	Roscoe	1 episode: "Fall of a Birdman"
1984	Minder	Sudbury	1 episode: "Hypnotising Rita"
1985	Time Trouble		
1985	Oscar	Clibborn	1 episode: "Gilded Youth"
1985	Bleak House	Nemo	2 episodes
1985–1986	Big Deal	Ronnie Day	Recurring
1986	Boon	Jack Evans, Doreen's ex-husband	2 episodes: "Grand Expectations" & "For Whom the Chimes Toll"
1989	Bergerac	Harry Tilson	1 episode: "Second Time Around"
1990	Ruth Rendell Mysteries	Edward Peveril	3 episodes: "Some Lie and Some Die"
1991	Aimée	Frank	
1992	Agatha Christie's Poirot	Alexander Bonaparte Cust	1 episode: "The A.B.C. Murders"
1992	The Blackheath Poisonings	Insp. Titmarsh	
1993	The Buddha of Suburbia	Matthew Pyke	
1993	The Bill	DCI Grant	1 episode: "Nothing Ventured"
1994	Grushko	Kartashov	3 part series
1994	Drop the Dead Donkey	Inspector	1 episode: "The Strike"
1994	Between the Lines	Milan	2 episodes: "The End User"
1995–2000	The Queen's Nose	Uncle Ginger	Recurring
1996	Our Friends in the North	Commander Harold Chapple	Recurring
1996	Cold Lazarus	Dr Rawl	2 episodes
1998	Bombay Blue	Supt. John Mayberry	
1999	Great Expectations	Compeyson	
2000	Dalziel and Pascoe	Gus Mullavey	1 episode: "A Sweeter Lazarus"
2001	In Deep	Keith Sullivan	1 episode: "Romeo Trap"
2001	The Life and Adventures of Nicholas Nickleby	Mr Brooker	
2002	The Estate Agents	Mr Love	1 episode: "Gangsters"
2003	Serious and Organised	Jimmy Fisk	1 episode: "Deal with the Devil"
2003	A Touch of Frost	Maynard	1 episode: "Hidden Truth"
2003	Ultimate Force	General Harkin	1 episode: "Mad Dogs"
2003	The Bill	Archie Foster	2 episodes
2003	Seven Wonders of the Industrial World	Farrington	1 episode: "Brooklyn Bridge"
2003	Holby City	Jay Miller	1 episode: "Façade"
2004	Midsomer Murders	Tim Settingfield	1 episode: "Sins of Commission"
2004	The Last Detective	Alfie Clemens	1 episode: "The Long Bank Holiday"
2005	Rose and Maloney	Ronnie Johnson	1 episode
2006	Eleventh Hour	Richard Adams	1 episode: "Kryptos"
2006	The Chatterley Affair	Gerald Gardiner	
2006	The Eagle: A Crime Odyssey; Ørnen: En krimi-odyssé	Aca Popov / Milan Nacuk	2 episodes: "Kodenavn: Minos"' & "Kodenavn: Ithaka – Del 24"
2006	The Bill	Alfie Sutton	1 episode
2006	Dracula	Alfred Singleton	
2007	Fallen Angel	Simon Martlesham	
2007	Holby City	William Chase	1 episode: "Past Imperfect"
2008	Heist	King Edward	
2008	Heroes and Villains	Garnier	1 episode: "Richard the Lionheart"
2008	Taggart	Alex Sternwood	1 episode: "Point of Light"
2008	New Tricks	Bobby 'Tar' Mcadam	1 episode: "Couldn't Organise One"
2008	Tess of the d'Urbervilles	Parson Tringham	
2008	Einstein and Eddington	Max Planck	
2009	Into the Storm	Lord Halifax	
2009	The Sarah Jane Adventures	Erasmus Darkening	2 episodes: "The Eternity Trap"
2009–2010	Being Human	Kemp	Recurring; 9 episodes
2010	Spooks	Stephen Kirby	1 episode Series 9 Ep 3
2010	Merlin	The Fisher King	1 episode: "The Eye of the Phoenix"
2011	The Suspicions of Mr Whicher	Peter Edlin QC	
2011	Black Mirror	Julian Hereford	1 episode: "The National Anthem"
2011–2012	Game of Thrones	Maester Luwin	Series 1–2, 14 episodes
2012	Wallander	Fredrik Thorson	1 episode: "An Event in Autumn"
2012	The Secret of Crickley Hall	Gordon Pyke	Episodes 2 & 3
2013	The Mill	Samuel Greg	Series 1
2013	Atlantis	Tiresias	1 episode: "Twist of Fate"
2014	New Worlds	Sidney	Episodes 3 & 4
2014	One Child	Jim Ashley	3 part series
2014	Quirke	Josh Crawford	Episode 1 Christine Falls
2015	Coalition	Paddy Ashdown	TV film
2015	Jekyll and Hyde	Garson	10 part series
2015	Doctor Who	The President	Episode: "Hell Bent"
2017	Peaky Blinders	Arthur Bigge	Episodes 1 & 6
2018	Endeavour	Emil Valdemar	Episode 2: "Cartouche"
2018	12 Monkeys	Seer	3 Episodes: "The End" (uncredited), "Legacy" & "Demons"
2018–2019	Les Misérables	Monsieur Mabeuf	3 episodes
2019	Chernobyl	Zharkov	2 episodes
2019	Temple	George	2 episodes
2020	Exposed: The Church's Darkest Secret	Bishop Peter Ball	Docu-drama, 2 episodes
2021	The Cleaner	Sir James	1 episode: "The Aristocrat"
