= Severn Valley Country Park =

Park in Shropshire, United Kingdom

Coordinates: 52.4534°N 2.3646°W

- Interactive map of Severn Valley Country Park
- Type: Country park
- Location: Shropshire, England, UK
- OS grid: SO7522684042
- Area: 126 acres (51 ha)
- Created: 1992
- Operator: Shropshire Council
- Status: Open
- Awards: Green Flag Award (2014)
- Nearest Village: Alveley

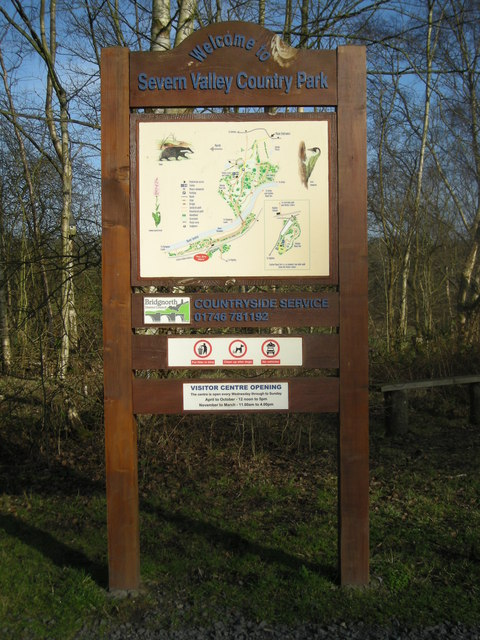
"Welcome to Severn Valley Country Park" Located at the Trail Head

Severn Valley Country Park is a country park in England, located near Alveley, Shropshire, 8 miles (13 km) from Bridgnorth, 7 miles from Kidderminster, roughly central in the Severn Valley. Originally the site of a huge coal mine, it is now a 126-acre (51 ha) park consisting of woodland, meadows and riverside banks with views over the River Severn and a Green Flag Award.

== History ==
The site was a coal mine for over 400 years, with shafts being put in at Highley in 1870; and the river and then the railway were used to transport the coal. A new shaft was sunk at Alveley in 1935, with production beginning in 1938 and being fully transferred from Highley by 1940. Sidings for the colliery on the Severn Valley Railway opened on 30 January 1939, with coal being transferred to the sidings via a ropeway across the river Severn. The mine finally closed as uneconomic in January 1969. Work started to reclaim the site in 1986; the park was officially opened to the public in 1992.

== Features ==
Severn Valley Country Park has many walks around the visitor's centre, as well as beside the river, and in the meadows and woodlands. The visitor's centre itself provides information on the park, a café and toilets. There is also a picnic site nearby and a large carpark. There is an additional picnic site near the river and another in a meadow at the top of the woods.

Severn Valley Country Park offers parents a wide range of fun activities for kids such as Bird Spotters Packs, Bug Hunting Guides and Butterfly Spotters Packs. Group activities for kids include organised Dinosaur Days, Fossil Hunts, and Pond Dipping Groups. Educational activities for kids include Pond Dipping, Orienteering, Mini-beast Hunts, and River Study events.

A lake and bird-hide are located before the car park. The main path runs down to the riverside. The woodland path stretches down to the riverside and is mainly on a boardwalk; it also contains a brook. There is also a walk along the entrance road to a large meadow with a lake and picnic site which joins onto the woodland path.

Across the bridleway bridge over the Severn is the Country Park Halt on the Severn Valley Railway which was built in 1996 on the site of the former colliery sidings.
