= Gilbert Gray (barrister) =

Gilbert Gray, QC (25 April 1928 – 7 April 2011) was a British barrister. Described as "one of the most effective jury advocates of his generation", he was involved in many high-profile criminal trials as well as public inquiries.

Gilbert Gray was the son of Scarborough butcher, JP Robert Gray and Elizabeth Gray. He gained a first-class honours degree at the University of Leeds, where he was also president of the university's union. Called to the bar in 1953, he was made a Queen's Counsel in 1971.

Among his most famous cases were the defence of Donald Neilson, the appeal of John Poulson, the Spycatcher case, the Matrix Churchill trial, and the Brink's-Mat robbery trial. He also represented Don Revie in his case against The Football Association and the public inquiry into the sinking of the Herald of Free Enterprise.
