= Highley =

Coordinates: 52.448°N 2.382°W

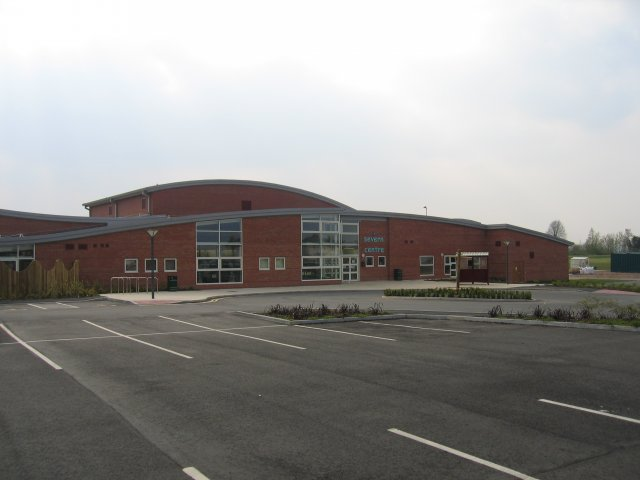
- Severn Centre

- Location within Shropshire
- Population: 3,605 (2011)
- OS grid reference: SO741834
- Civil parish: Highley
- Unitary authority: Shropshire
- Ceremonial county: Shropshire
- Region: West Midlands
- Country: England
- Sovereign state: United Kingdom
- Post town: BRIDGNORTH
- Postcode district: WV16
- Dialling code: 01746
- Police: West Mercia
- Fire: Shropshire
- Ambulance: West Midlands
- UK Parliament: South Shropshire

Highley is a village and civil parish in the county and district of Shropshire, England. It is located on the west bank of the River Severn and is 7 miles (11 km) south east of Bridgnorth.

== History ==
Highley began as a rural farming community, including an entry in the Domesday Book, later becoming a significant area for stone quarrying which provided some of the stone for Worcester Cathedral. Coal mining began in the area in the Middle Ages, but in the late 19th century the village was revolutionised by coal mining with large-scale operations beginning in 1878. A period of intense housebuilding also followed, giving Highley its distinctive red-brick terraced miners' houses. In the 1930s, the mine was extended to the neighbouring village of Alveley across the River Severn and a tunnel and bridge constructed between the two. There are also historical bridging points at Bridgnorth to the north and Bewdley to the south, and in Hampton Loade a private bridge used by the emergency services.

The mine closed in 1969 due to subsidence and waterlogging. The bridge remained open to bridleway traffic only, due to subsidence from the steep valley sides. The mine area on the Alveley (east) side was converted into an industrial estate as coal mining ceased, and subsequently landscaped into the Severn Valley Country Park in the late 1980s. Initially this was as an exercise to use trees to shore up the coal spoils, and later as a tourist destination which now includes public artwork and a sculpture trail, the Seam Pavement Trail.

The trail is a series of seven bronze plaques depicting Highley's past and incorporates the designs of West Midlands artist Saranjit Birdi. He included many miner's nicknames into the artwork, gleaned from archive information and research within the local community. Nicknames of the miners, such as Dick the Devil, Joyful Clappers, Cider Biscuit, Flaming Heck and others, are incorporated into the work. Birdi calls it "a seam through time", echoing the skilfully mined coal seams being laid down and later extracted over time. One plaque, Plough and Lady, depicts Lady Godiva, who owned Highley Manor in the 11th century. Birdi is also responsible for another sculpture, A Song of Steam, at Highley station.

In 2000, the bridge was declared unsafe and a new footbridge constructed (completed 2006).

Highley was the village where 17-year-old murder victim Lesley Whittle lived, and from which she was abducted by Donald Neilson, the Black Panther, in 1975. Lesley, the daughter of coach firm owner George Whittle (1905–1970), was taken from her home on 13 January 1975 and found dead on an underground ledge beneath Bathpool Park near Kidsgrove, Staffordshire, on 7 March that year. Neilson was found guilty of murdering Lesley Whittle and three other people (as well as wounding a Dudley security guard, who later died having never fully recovered from his injuries) at his trial in the summer of 1976, and sentenced to life imprisonment. Lesley Whittle's funeral took place at Highley Parish Church. A memorial plaque to Lesley and her father is in the porch of the church.

== Transport ==
Highley has two stops on the Severn Valley Railway, at Highley Station and Country Park Halt.

The main railway stop is a substantial sandstone Victorian railway station. The station is also home to a museum of village life, housed within a vintage post office sorting carriage and home of the Engine Shed which houses a collection of heritage locomotives, a gift shop and a café. Down a small flight of steps from Highley railway station is the Ship Inn Public House, and from there a public footpath leads back to the Country Park and to the Severn Way waymarked walk.

The other stop is an unstaffed request halt near the bridge for the Country Park. Passengers wishing to board the train at the halt stop the train by holding out their hand, as if hailing a bus, and those wishing to alight are advised to speak to the guard of the train before it leaves the previous station.

There is also bus service through the village, operated by Diamond West Midlands.

In January 2020 it was reported that the GP surgery in the village was having trouble recruiting locum doctors because of potholes on the way in to the surgery on Bridgnorth Road. In November 2022 the current providers of NHS services to the community at Highley Medical Centre announced they would be ending their contract there in March 2023, and consultation was ongoing to secure new providers at the location.

== Culture and community ==
Highley houses the Severn Centre, a sports and leisure complex complete with heated lido (open-air swimming pool) that also includes the local library, football ground and cricket pitch. (Latter frequently used to exercise dogs despite dogs being banned.) There is also a Country Park, the sculpture trail plus several restaurants and pubs.

=== Highley Colliery Brass Band ===
The Highley Colliery Brass Band is a local brass band which first existed from the turn of the 19th century until the closure of the colliery in 1969. It reformed in 1993 when a handful of brass band musicians met at the Bache Public House in Highley. Member numbers grew, and under the baton of Ray Millichamp the band began performances under the name of Highley Band. In 2000, to coincide with the new uniform, the band adopted a Pit Head Wheel emblem and was renamed Highley Colliery Band, to reflect the mining heritage of its home village.

== Notable people ==
- Aubrey Scriven (1904 in Highley – c.1988), a professional footballer who made over 200 pro appearances for Birmingham, Bradford City and Bristol City
- Gerry Hitchens (1934–1983), footballer, notably for Aston Villa and England international, was a miner at Highley colliery
- Stan Jones (born 1938) footballer, mainly Walsall and WBA
- Colin Hemsley (born 1949 in Highley), a cricketer who played for Shropshire
- David Tristram (born 1957) a comic playwright, lives in Highley
- Mark Humphries (born 1965 in Highley), cricketer who played for Staffordshire

== See also ==
- Listed buildings in Highley
