= Alveley =

Village in Shropshire, England

Coordinates: 52.457°N 2.353°W

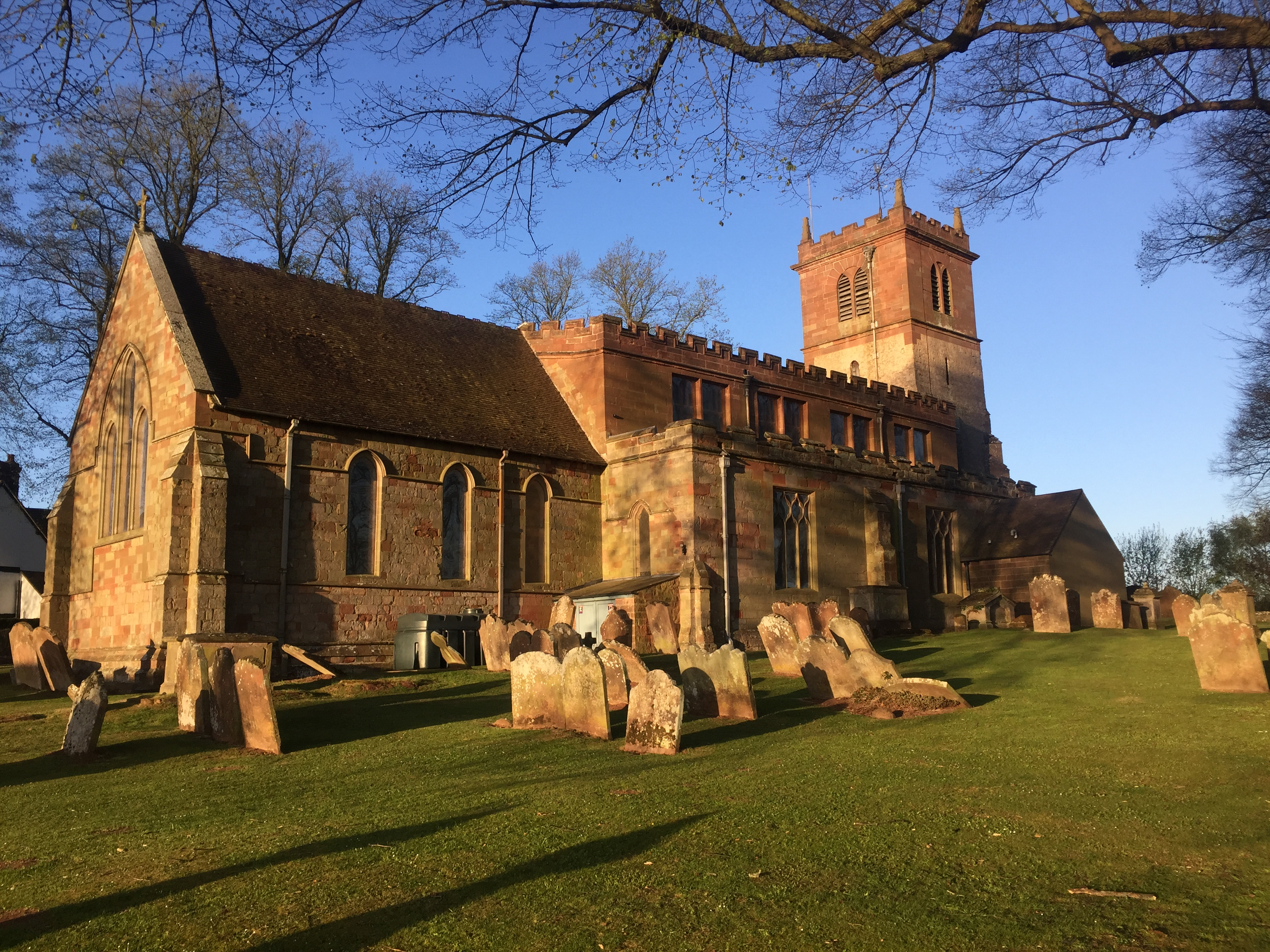
- St Mary's parish church

- Location within Shropshire
- Population: 2,098 (2011 Census)
- OS grid reference: SO760844
- Civil parish: Alveley and Romsley
- Unitary authority: Shropshire
- Ceremonial county: Shropshire
- Region: West Midlands
- Country: England
- Sovereign state: United Kingdom
- Post town: Bridgnorth
- Postcode district: WV15
- Dialling code: 01746
- Police: West Mercia
- Fire: Shropshire
- Ambulance: West Midlands
- UK Parliament: South Shropshire
- Website: Alveley and Romsley Parish Council

Alveley is a village in the Severn Valley in southeast Shropshire, England, about 11 miles (18 km) south-southeast of Bridgnorth. It is in the civil parish of Alveley and Romsley. The Office for National Statistics (ONS) estimated that the parish population was 2,100 in mid-2022. It is served by bus service 297 (Kidderminster - Bridgnorth) operated by Select Bus Services.

The Black Death is said to have killed 60% of the village population in 1349. A stone cross, the Buttercross, 2 miles (3 km) outside the village dates from the time of the Black Death when it was a place for food to be left for the village when it was quarantined.

== Churches ==
The Church of England parish church of Saint Mary is 12th-century with a 14th-century south chapel. In the chapel is a very faded 14th-century mural that is thought to represent the Seven Deadly Sins. The upper part of the tower was rebuilt in about 1779. The building was heavily restored in 1878–79 under the direction of Sir Arthur Blomfield. It is a Grade II* listed building. The church contains a stone war memorial, inscribed with names of dead from both World Wars, with its centre piece a figure of Christ with arms outstretched and, below it on a shelf, a wooden grave marker cross to Signaller William Horace Leith who died at a Japanese prisoner of war camp in Thailand in 1943.

Alveley has also an ex-Methodist chapel, which was built in 1862 and is now used as a community centre and tea room.

== Coal mining and country park ==
From 1937 to 1969 the village had a coal mine in conjunction with the neighbouring village of Highley across the River Severn. The first shaft at Alveley Colliery was sunk in 1935. Production began in 1938 and reached full output in 1944. Coal was transferred to sidings on the Severn Valley Railway on the opposite bank of the river, to be taken away by rail. Declining coal quality at a time of national over-supply led to the colliery closing in January 1969 leaving high unemployment and a ravaged landscape. An industrial estate was built after the mine closure along with a landscape reclamation scheme in 1986 and the disused colliery and spoil tips were converted into the Severn Valley Country Park.

The landscape includes meadows, woods, ponds and wetlands with waymarked trails of short and longer lengths to encourage locals and visitors to explore the village's heritage fully. Every year a Miner's Memories Day is held at the Country Park Visitor Centre which permanently houses mine memorabilia and has a café and indoor viewpoint over the valley. The display includes miners' picks, spikes, crowbars, breathing equipment used in mine rescue, photos (many donated by local residents), and a certificate awarded to a local Alveley miner on achieving "56 years service to the mine and his country".

In 2006 a new footbridge linking Alveley and Highley was opened in the Country Park. This replaced a 1930s bridge that had become unsafe. The bridge provides access from Alveley to the Country Park Halt on the Severn Valley Railway, which is on the Highley side of the river on the site of the former coal washing plant and colliery sidings. The riverbank is popular with anglers, along with a number of local private pools.

In 2017, the community led Alveley Mining Heritage Group was formed to preserve and present memories of mining in the village for the benefit of future generations.

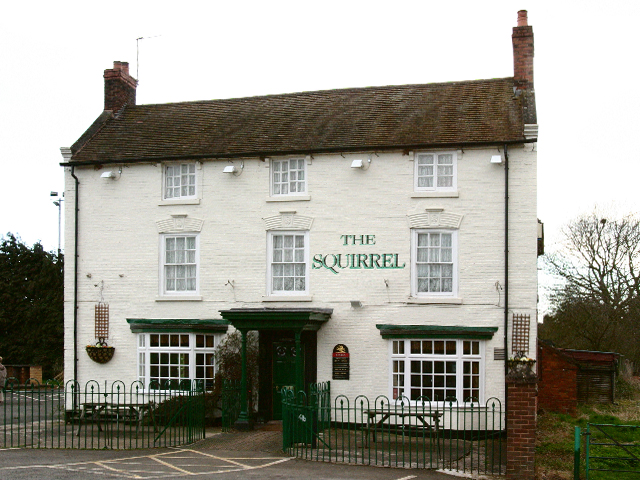
The Squirrel public house

== Village ==
Alveley has several historic pubs including the Three Horseshoes, parts of which may be 17th-century. The others are The Squirrel and The Royal Oak. There is also the Mill Hotel and a working men's club. The village has a primary school, small supermarket and newsagent and a few other small shops and eateries, in addition to its 'Parish Memorial Hall' and attached recreation ground which was opened in 1947 as a memorial to local dead of both World Wars.

== Cricket club ==
Alveley Cricket Club was founded in 1908 and played at Coton Hall on the outskirts of the village, at the former home of general Robert E. Lee's ancestors. After the Second World War it moved to play on the Recreation Ground in the centre of Alveley.

Its pavilion was built in 1981 and extended in 2007.

Until the mid-1970s friendly cricket was played before joining the Kidderminster League in 1989. The club now plays in the Worcestershire County League (Saturday) with friendlies played on a Sunday. As well as the two Saturday sides we run a midweek team who play in the Kidderminster League, the club also runs a successful junior section for children aged between 4 and 17 years.

== Countryside ==
A small hamlet to the southwest of the village, Little London, is one of more than 25 settlements which share the capital city's name.

The parish contains two other manors, besides the manor of Alveley, Kingsnordley and Astley. Alan James Nicholls documented the Alveley parish in The History of Alveley, published 1994, ISBN 0-9523134-0-5.

== Governance ==
Alveley is part of the electoral ward called Bridgnorth South & Alveley. Mid-2022, the ONS estimated the previous ward population was 4,300. In 2024, the ONS estimated that the new Bridgnorth South & Alveley ward had a population of 3,466.

After winning a tie-breaker in the 2025 Shropshire Council elections, Colin Taylor became the councillor for the new ward.

Bridgnorth South & Alveley
Party	Candidate	Votes	%	±%
Liberal Democrats	Colin Taylor	508	41.10	N/A
Reform	Karen Michelle Webb-James	508	41.10	N/A
Conservative	Kieran James Chambers	173	14.00	N/A
Green	Robert Austin Cunning	24	1.94	N/A
Labour	Gail Marcia Waters	23	1.86	N/A
Majority		0	0.00	N/A
Turnout		1,236		
Liberal Democrats win (new seat)				

== Notable residents ==
- Ellie Anderson (born 2003) cricketer

== See also ==
- Listed buildings in Alveley
