= Donald Neilson =

British criminal (1936–2011)

- Mugshot of Neilson
- Born: Donald Nappey; 1 August 1936; Bradford, West Riding of Yorkshire, England
- Died: 18 December 2011 (aged 75); Norwich, Norfolk, England
- Other names: The Black Panther; The Phantom; Handy Andy
- Penalty: Life imprisonment

Details
- Span of crimes: 1971–1975
- Country: England
- Killed: 4
- Date apprehended: 11 December 1975

Donald Neilson (born Donald Nappey; 1 August 1936 – 18 December 2011), also known as "The Black Panther," "The Phantom," and "Handy Andy," was an English armed robber, kidnapper and murderer. Neilson carried out a series of sub-post office robberies between 1971 and 1974, killing three people. In 1975, he kidnapped for a £50,000 ransom Lesley Whittle, an heiress from Shropshire, who died in captivity. Neilson was arrested later that year, convicted of four murders and sentenced to life imprisonment in July 1976. He remained incarcerated until his death in 2011.

== Early life ==
Donald Neilson was born Donald Nappey in Bradford, West Riding of Yorkshire, on 1 August 1936. Neilson reportedly had a difficult childhood, losing his mother to breast cancer when he was 10. He was also the target of bullying at school due to his surname's similarity to the word "nappy".

Neilson served in the British Army and was posted in Kenya, Cyprus and Aden as part of the King's Own Yorkshire Light Infantry.

In April 1955, eighteen-year-old Neilson married Irene Tate, who was two years his senior. Their only child, a daughter named Kathryn, was born in 1960. Four years later, Neilson legally changed his surname so that his daughter would avoid the mistreatment he had endured in his youth. Why he chose the name "Neilson" remains disputed; according to authors David Bell and Harry Hawkes, he took the name from a man whose taxi business he had purchased, while Lena Fearnley, a lodger who had stayed with the Neilson family in the early 1960s, reported that he took the name from an ice cream van.

== Burglary and robbery ==
Neilson committed over 400 house burglaries, which went undetected during the early stages of his criminal career. Before he became notorious as "The Black Panther", he was sought by authorities under various nicknames, such as "The Phantom" and "Handy Andy". To confuse the police, he adopted a different modus operandi every few weeks.

After stealing guns and ammunition from a house in Cheshire, he escalated his criminal activity, turning to robbing small post offices. Neilson committed eighteen such crimes between 1971 and 1974. The violence of his crimes increased as he sought to protect himself from occupants prepared to resist and defend their property.

In February 1972, Neilson broke into a post office in Heywood, Lancashire. The postmaster, Leslie Richardson, and his wife awoke to find Neilson in their bedroom. During the ensuing struggle, Neilson brandished a sawn-off shotgun. The confrontation continued until Neilson escaped, leaving Richardson injured.

== First murders ==
Neilson committed his first three murders in 1974. While performing post office robberies, he fatally shot two sub-postmasters and the husband of a sub-postmistress.

The Baxenden murder resulted in Neilson being dubbed "The Black Panther" when a reporter ended a news report about Neilson asking, "Where is this Black Panther?" referencing Neilson's physical speed and all-black attire. Neilson was linked to the post office shootings after he shot security guard Gerald Smith six times while following a ransom trail. Forensic examination showed the bullets were fired from the .22 LR pistol used to murder previous victims.

== Kidnap and murder of Lesley Whittle ==
Lesley Whittle (3 May 1957 – 14 January 1975) was a 17-year-old girl who would become Neilson's youngest victim. Whittle's father had left his entire fortune to his mistress and their children, Lesley and her brother Ronald. After reading about a family dispute over Whittle's will, Neilson planned for three years to obtain part of the estate.

On 14 January 1975, Neilson entered the Whittle family home in Highley, Shropshire, and kidnapped Lesley from her bedroom. Neilson left a note demanding £50,000. A series of police errors and other circumstances resulted in Whittle's brother, Ronald, being unable to deliver the ransom money at the designated time and place demanded by the kidnapper.

Lesley Whittle's body was found on 7 March 1975, hanging from a wire at the bottom of the drainage shaft where Neilson had tethered her in Bathpool Park, Kidsgrove, Staffordshire. The subsequent post-mortem examination showed that Whittle had died from vagal inhibition, not from strangulation. The shock of the fall had caused her heart to stop.

Some analysts thought it was possible Neilson pushed Whittle off the ledge where he had kept her. Others theorized that Neilson panicked and fled on the night of the failed ransom collection without returning to the shaft, and that Whittle may have been alive for a considerable period of time before she fell to her death. The pathologist noted that Whittle weighed only 98 pounds (44 kg) when found, her stomach and intestines were completely empty, she had lost a considerable amount of weight, and was emaciated. He concluded that she had not eaten for a minimum of three days, but it could have been much longer.

== Capture and arrest ==
In December 1975 police officers Tony White and Stuart Mackenzie, stationed on a side road off the A60 in Mansfield, encountered Donald Neilson, who was carrying a holdall. When they approached him for questioning Neilson produced a sawn-off shotgun and forced White into the back of their vehicle. He then ordered White to move to the front while he took the passenger seat, holding the firearm against Mackenzie.

Neilson directed the officers to drive towards Blidworth. During the journey White attempted to locate rope as instructed by Neilson. Seizing an opportunity when Mackenzie swerved at a junction, White pushed the weapon aside as Mackenzie applied the brakes, stopping the vehicle near the Junction Chip Shop in Rainworth. The gun discharged, causing a minor injury to White's hand, and Mackenzie left the car and called for assistance.

Nearby residents, Roy Morris and Keith Wood, intervened and subdued Neilson. The officers restrained him while shielding him from an agitated crowd. Neilson was secured until additional police units arrived and took him into custody.

== Trial and conviction ==
During Neilson's trial at Oxford Crown Court, his defence barrister, Gilbert Gray, contended that Whittle had accidentally fallen from the ledge and died as a result. He noted that Neilson had fed her chicken soup, spaghetti and meatballs and bought her fish and chips, chicken legs and Polo mints. The prosecution contested these claims. Evidence showed that Neilson had provided his victim with a sleeping bag designed to prevent hypothermia, mattresses, survival blankets, survival bags, a bottle of brandy, six paperback books, a copy of The Times and two magazines for reading, a small puzzle, and two brightly coloured napkins. These items were found by the police, either in the shaft or in the subterranean canal running below it.

In his closing speech for the defence, Gray described the conditions that Neilson provided for Whittle, noting ways that he tried to provide for her comfort. For instance, he asked the jury whether they believed any hangman's noose would be padded and lagged with 77½ inches of Elastoplast to avoid chafing, or that any scaffold would be cushioned with a rubber mattress and sleeping bags. He noted that Whittle would not have died if the wire had not snagged on a stanchion because her feet were only six inches from the bottom of the shaft. Gray clarified: "This is not something the defence has made up. Her height from the neck was four feet, and there was a five-foot length of ligature, giving an overall length of nine feet. The drop from the landing to the floor of the tunnel was six feet eleven inches, so that if it had not been for the unforeseen snagging which shortened the tether, there would have been two feet to spare, and she would have landed on her feet at the bottom of the shaft."

He asked the jury why Neilson bothered to keep her alive once he had recorded the ransom messages, arguing he could have simply clubbed her to death, and hidden the body in woodland. Gray finished his speech by opining, "I submit that when Lesley Whittle went over the platform, it was an unlooked-for misadventure, unplanned and undesired. Neilson started something that went hideously wrong."

On 1 July 1976, Neilson was convicted of the kidnapping and murder of Lesley Whittle, for which he was given a life sentence. Three weeks later, he was convicted of the murders of two postmasters and the husband of a postmistress. In total, Neilson received five life sentences. He was assessed by expert witness Lionel Haward, a forensic psychologist, and was found to be "suffering from a psycho-pathological condition of some severity" but not to the extent that it resulted in diminished responsibility. The judge, Mr Justice Mars-Jones, also gave Neilson a further 61 years: 21 years for kidnapping Lesley Whittle, and 10 years for blackmailing her mother. Three further sentences of 10 years each were imposed for the two burglary charges when he stole guns and ammunition, and for possessing the sawn-off shotgun with intent to endanger life.

All the sentences were to run concurrently. The judge told Neilson that the enormity of his crimes put him in a class apart from almost all other convicted murderers in recent years. Neilson's defence team, solicitor, Barrington Black, junior counsel, Norman Jones, and leading counsel, Gilbert Gray, all claimed that his conviction was a reflection of public opinion, a backlash of the publicity given to the hunt for the kidnapper and killer, and that he should have been convicted only of the lesser charge of manslaughter.

Neilson was acquitted of the attempted murders of sub-postmistress Margaret Grayland and PC Tony White, but found guilty of the lesser alternative charges of inflicting grievous bodily harm on Grayland, and of possessing a shotgun with the intent of endangering life at Mansfield. A charge of attempting to murder security guard Gerald Smith, whom Neilson shot six times while checking the Whittle ransom trail, was not pursued due to legal complications: Smith died more than a year and a day after being shot. The trial judge recommended that Neilson receive a whole life tariff. After the verdicts, Gray visited his client in a cell below the court, and found Neilson in the corner of his cell, curled up in a foetal position, purportedly dejected, and allegedly filled with remorse for Whittle and her family.

== Trial and conviction of Irene Neilson ==
Following Neilson's arrest in Mansfield his wife, Irene, became concerned when he failed to return home. In response she burned approximately fifty postal orders in their coal fire. During a subsequent search of their house, police discovered charred remains in the chimney. Irene was later convicted of cashing more than eighty stolen postal orders obtained during her husband's post office raids.

Irene claimed to have been forced into cashing these items in various post offices over a large area. Her solicitor, Barrington Black, placed the blame squarely on Donald Neilson's complete domination of his wife, describing him as a "Svengali, who had exercised a hypnotic influence". Black added, "He was a quasi-military figure who barked orders at his wife and daughter, and woe betide anyone who disobeyed him."

The solicitor said he felt this portrayal was confirmed by Donald Neilson when he had visited him in his top security cell. It seemed a formality that Irene, then aged 42 with no prior convictions, would be placed on probation, but a court report said that probation would not be suitable. Black pressed hard for Irene Neilson to be fined, asking the magistrates if she really deserved to be harshly treated for a situation that was forced upon her, and insisted her last three years with Neilson before his arrest had been "hell". The magistrates responded that whilst they had every sympathy with a woman before the courts for the first time they regarded her activities as a deliberate course of conduct. She received twelve months in prison according to official court records. An appeal was immediately lodged.

Gilbert Gray QC was briefed to represent her and he produced Donald Neilson as a surprise witness. The QC told the judge, sitting with two magistrates, that he was anxious that the court should be aware of the pressure and constraints placed upon Irene Neilson as a result of her husband. Gray described how Neilson "was the man who struck fear and dread into pretty much the whole community, and this woman lived with him." However the judges found Donald Neilson's testimony vague and upheld his wife's conviction and sentence.

While Irene was in prison a major newspaper paid a large amount for the Neilsons' story. Six years later, in an interview with The Sunday People, Irene Neilson said that she doubted she would have been jailed had she not been Neilson's wife. She said everyone had wanted blood after her husband's trial. Ultimately she served eight months before being released with full remission for good behaviour.

=== 2008 appeal for Neilson ===
Following subsequent legal judgements in various other cases and the implications of European Union Human Rights laws, Neilson was repeatedly confirmed to be on the Home Office's list of prisoners with whole-life tariffs. A succession of Home Secretaries ruled that life should mean life for Neilson. In 2008, Neilson applied to the High Court to have his minimum term reverted to 30 years. On 12 June 2008, Mr Justice Teare upheld the whole-life tariff and imparted:

This is a case where the gravity of the applicant's offences justifies a whole life order. The manner in which the young girl was killed demonstrates that it too involved a substantial degree of premeditation or planning. It also involved the abduction of the young girl. The location and manner of Lesley Whittle's death indicates that she must have been subjected by the applicant to a dreadful and horrific ordeal.

== Death ==
In the early hours of 17 December 2011, Neilson was taken from Norwich Prison to Norfolk and Norwich University Hospital owing to breathing difficulties. His condition deteriorated and he was later confirmed to have died the following day, 18 December 2011, at the age of 75. The cause of his death was reported as respiratory failure. Neilson had been in declining health for some time prior to his death.
