= Harnage =

Village in Shropshire, England

Coordinates: 52.634°N 2.641°W

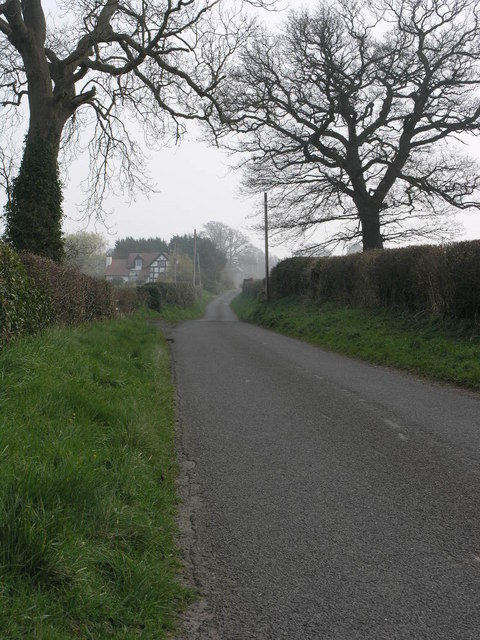
- The lane from Cound approaching Harnage

- Location within Shropshire
- OS grid reference: SJ566042
- Civil parish: Cound
- Unitary authority: Shropshire
- Ceremonial county: Shropshire
- Region: West Midlands
- Country: England
- Sovereign state: United Kingdom
- Post town: SHREWSBURY
- Postcode district: SY5
- Dialling code: 01952
- Police: West Mercia
- Fire: Shropshire
- Ambulance: West Midlands
- UK Parliament: Shrewsbury and Atcham

Harnage is a small village in the English county of Shropshire. It is located to the south east of the village of Cound, in whose civil parish it lies, and the nearest notable settlement is Cressage.

Harnage is considered a hamlet, not a village, as it does not have a post office. One road runs through the hamlet, passing residences, Harnage Farm, and Harnage House, a 17th-century house built on the site of an older mansion, allegedly dating back to the 11th or 12th century. The land was owned in the 12th century by Richard de Harnage, the progenitor of the Harnage family in England and in the USA.

The name derives from the old English and means "rocky edge", which describes the area's landscape. It is completely agricultural. At the north western end of the road running through Harnage is the village of Cound (pronounced Koond) and at the other end is a junction at the foot of the hill, that runs into the place called Harnage Grange, a farm consortium, which, in ancient times pre-Henry VIII, used to be the home farm of Buildwas Abbey and Wenlock Priory, a few miles away near the town of Much Wenlock. The monks' fish farm, known as stew ponds, still exists today.

== See also ==
- Listed buildings in Cound
