= Berrington railway station =

Former railway station in Shropshire, England

Berrington
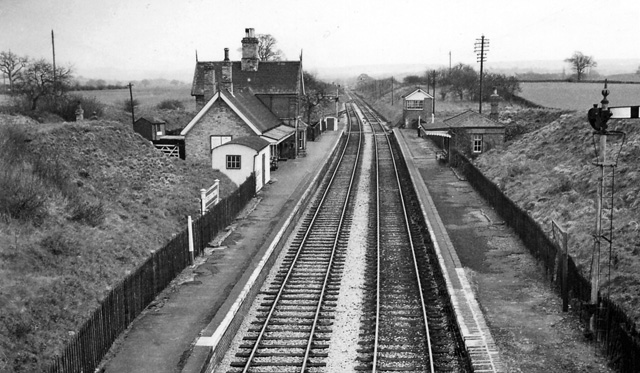
- Berrington railway station in 1962

General information
- Location: Cross Houses, Shropshire; England
- Coordinates: 52.6628°N 2.6879°W
- Grid reference: SJ535074
- Platforms: 2

Other information
- Status: Disused

History
- Original company: Severn Valley Railway
- Pre-grouping: Great Western Railway
- Post-grouping: Great Western Railway

Key dates
- 1862: Opened
- 1894: Additional platform added
- 1963: Closed
Location

Berrington railway station was a railway station on the Severn Valley line serving the village of Berrington, Shropshire. It opened in 1862 with a single platform and a siding. By 1894 it had acquired an additional platform along with a signal box and the sidings had been expanded. Despite the name it was actually closer to the neighbouring village of Cross Houses. Although thought by some people to have been closed as part of the Beeching axe in 1963 its planned closure pre-dated his report. The station and its buildings now house a private dwelling.

Preceding station	Disused railways	Following station
Shrewsbury; Line closed, station open	Great Western Railway; Severn Valley Railway	Cound Halt; Line and station closed
