= Listed buildings in Cound =

Cound is a civil parish in Shropshire, England. It contains 51 listed buildings that are recorded in the National Heritage List for England. Of these, two are listed at Grade I, the highest of the three grades, three are at Grade II*, the middle grade, and the others are at Grade II, the lowest grade. The parish contains the small villages of Cound, Upper Cound and Harnage, and is otherwise entirely rural. Most of the listed buildings are houses and associated structures, cottages, farmhouses and farm buildings, many of which are timber framed, and some have cruck construction. The other listed buildings include a church and items in the churchyard, a former monastic grange, a former manor house, a country house, two bridges, a public house, two milestones, a milepost, four pumps, and a war memorial

== Key ==
Grade	Criteria
I	Buildings of exceptional interest, sometimes considered to be internationally important
II*	Particularly important buildings of more than special interest
II	Buildings of national importance and special interest

== Buildings ==
Name and location	Photograph	Date	Notes	Grade
St Peter's Church; 52.64093°N 2.65434°W		13th century	The oldest parts of the church are the tower, the nave, the south aisle and south porch. The north aisle was added in 1842, and the chancel in 1862, both by S. Pountney Smith. The church is built in sandstone with tile roofs, and consists of a nave, north and south aisles, a south porch, a chancel with a north vestry and organ chamber, and a west tower. The tower has two stages, diagonal buttresses, a northeast stair turret, gargoyles, an embattled parapet with eight pinnacles, and a low pyramidal cap with a weathervane.	I
Harnage Grange; 52.61569°N 2.63757°W	—	Medieval	Originally a monastic grange, later a farmhouse it was extended in the 16th and early 19th centuries, but most of the exterior dates from 1878, with further alterations in about 1933. It is in grey sandstone and red brick, and has tile roofs. The building has a U-shaped plan, in parts with one storey and an attic, and elsewhere in two storeys or two storeys and attics. The doorways have chamfered surrounds, and the windows vary; some are mullioned, some are mullioned and transomed, some are casements, and there are gabled half-dormers. Other features include parapeted gables with obelisk finials, and a crow-stepped gable.	II
Barn to northeast of Golding; 52.62758°N 2.67430°W		15th or 16th century	The barn is timber framed with weatherboarding and cruck construction on a plinth of red brick and stone, with red brick gable ends, and a tile roof. There are five bays, brick buttresses at the east end, opposed doorways, and a loft door and vents in the gable ends. Inside are four full cruck trusses.	II
Fullway Cottage; 52.62818°N 2.66298°W	—	Early 16th century	The cottage is timber framed with red brick nogging, partly rebuilt in rendered brick, and has an asbestos sheet roof. There is one storey and an attic, and two bays, and the windows are casements.	II
Gazebo east of Harnage Grange; 52.61589°N 2.63628°W	—	Late 16th century	The gazebo is in brick on a chamfered plinth, and has a pyramidal stone-slate roof with a finial. It has a polygonal plan and a south wing, and two storeys. To the south is a chamfered crow-stepped gable. There is a chamfered round-arch doorway, and the windows are chamfered and mullioned.	II*
5 Golding; 52.62715°N 2.67415°W	—	Early to mid 17th century	The cottage is timber framed and rendered with a tile roof. There is one storey and an attic, two bays, and later flanking one-storey lean-tos. On the front is a gabled porch, the windows are casements, and there are two gabled eaves dormers.	II
Mill Cottage; 52.64478°N 2.65833°W	—	Early to mid 17th century (probable)	The cottage was altered and extended in the 20th century. It is in rendered timber framing and stone, and has a tile roof. There is one storey and an attic, and the original part has two bays. The doorway has a timber porch with a hipped roof, there is a canted bay window, and gabled eaves dormers, and the windows are casements with diamond leading.	II
21 and 24 Upper Cound; 52.63912°N 2.66220°W	—	Mid 17th century	Probably originally one house, it was altered and extended in the 19th century, and has been divided into two dwellings. It is partly timber framed with brick nogging on a brick plinth, and partly in brick with some rendering, and has a tile roof. The house consists of a hall range of four bays, and a two-bay cross-wing; part has two storeys, and the other part has one storey and an attic. The windows are casements and there are two gabled half-dormers. The doorway has a gabled porch, a dentil eaves cornice, and a round archway.	II
Brookside Cottage; 52.64096°N 2.66154°W	—	Mid 17th century	The cottage was extended and altered in the 19th and 20th centuries. The original part is timber framed with brick nogging on a brick and sandstone plinth, the extensions are in brick with applied timber framing, and the roof is tiled. There is one storey with an attic, the original part has two bays, and there is a single-storey 20th-century extension recessed to the right that is cantilevered over the Cound Brook. Most of the windows are casements, and there are gabled eaves dormers.	II
Bull Farmhouse; 52.60535°N 2.65543°W	—	17th century	The farmhouse was extended in the 19th and 20th centuries. The original part is timber framed with brick nogging on a stone plinth, and partly rebuilt and extended in brick, some of it rendered, and with roofs in tile and sandstone slate. There is one storey and attics, and it has an L-shaped plan plus additions. The windows are casements, and there are gabled eaves dormers.	II
Drover's Cottage; 52.63986°N 2.66343°W	—	17th century (probable)	The house was extended and altered in the 19th century. The original part is timber framed, and has been partly encased and extended in brick painted to resemble timber framing. The roofs are tiled, and the house has a U-shaped plan, consisting of the original hall range, with one storey and an attic, and a dentil eaves cornice, and gabled cross-wings projecting to the northwest. The windows are casements, and in the hall range is a gable eaves dormer.	II
Terrace wall, Golding; 52.62659°N 2.67570°W	—	17th century	The terrace retaining wall was extended in the 18th and 19th centuries. It is in red brick with a sandstone coping, and has an L-shaped plan. The wall is about 40 metres (130 ft) long and 5 metres (16 ft) high. There is a central flight of 16 steps with a coped parapet, and buttresses.	II
Barn to northwest of Harnage Grange; 52.61651°N 2.63851°W	—	Mid 17th century	The barn is timber framed and weatherboarded on a sandstone plinth, with some red brick nogging, and a tile roof. There are four bays, and the barn contains opposing wagon entrances.	II
Farm buildings to northwest of Harnage Grange; 52.61598°N 2.63867°W	—	Mid 17th century	The farm buildings, originally four barns, were altered in the 19th century. They are timber framed with red brick nogging and weatherboarding, on a plinth of sandstone and brick. They were partly rebuilt in grey sandstone and brick, and have tile roofs. There is one storey and lofts, and the buildings are in a U-shaped plan forming three sides of a courtyard. They contain various openings, and have an external flight of ten steps, and a triangular wooden dovecote on a gable end.	II
Garden shed and wall east of Harnage Grange; 52.61561°N 2.63631°W	—	17th century	The shed is in red brick on a sandstone plinth, with one storey, and has a stone-slate roof with stone coped parapeted gable ends, and a weathervane. The wall to the north is in red brick on a stone plinth, and is about 25 metres (82 ft) long and between 2 metres (6 ft 7 in) and 3 metres (9.8 ft) high.	II
Yew Tree Cottage; 52.63995°N 2.66269°W	—	Mid 17th century	The house was altered and extended in the 20th century. The original part is timber framed with brick nogging on a sandstone plinth, the southeast gable end has been rebuilt with concrete block infill, the extensions are in brick with applied timber framing, and the roof is tiled. There are two storeys, an L-shaped plan, two original bays on the front, a gable off-centre to the left, a garage door on the left, and the windows are casements.	II
Golding; 52.62680°N 2.67558°W	—	c. 1660	A manor house, later a farmhouse, it has a timber framed core, encased and extended in brick with sandstone dressings, and a tile roof. The house has a U-shaped plan consisting of a three-storey central range, and two cross-wings with two storeys and attics, and there is a kitchen block at the southeast corner. The left cross-wing is dated 1688, and the right cross-wing dates from the 18th century. The porch has unfluted Roman Doric columns, reeded impost blocks with dentil cornices, and an open triangular pediment with an arched tympanum. The windows are mixed; some are casements, others are sashes, and there are flat-roofed dormers.	II*
46 and 47 Harnage Bank; 52.63699°N 2.64828°W	—	Mid to late 17th century	A pair of timber framed cottages with brick nogging on a sandstone plinth and with a tile roof. There is one storey and an attic, two bays, a basement at the northwest, a 20th-century flat-roofed extension on the right, and 20th-century extension to the rear of the left cottage. The windows are casements, and there are three gabled eaves dormers.	II
32 Upper Cound; 52.63944°N 2.66201°W	—	Mid to late 17th century	The cottage has been altered and extended. It is timber framed with brick nogging on a brick plinth, some rebuilding and extensions in brick, and a concrete tile roof with a stepped parapeted gable to the left. There is one storey and an attic, two bays, and a single-storey lean-to on the left. The central brick porch has a round arch, the windows are casements, and there are gabled eaves dormers.	II
Stables and coach house, Harnage Grange; 52.61602°N 2.63810°W	—	Mid to late 17th century	The stables and coach house, later used for other purposes, were refaced in the 18th century, and partly rebuilt and extended in the 19th century. The original part is timber framed, refaced, rebuilt and extended in brick and sandstone, and roofed in slate and stone-slate, hipped to the north. There are two storeys and an attic, and the building contains seven segmental-headed blind arches, doorways, casement windows, gabled dormers, loft doors, and an external flight of 13 steps.	II
Garden wall, Golding; 52.62670°N 2.67603°W	—	Late 17th century	The wall encloses the garden on the north, east and west sides, and was partly rebuilt in the 20th century. It is in red brick with red sandstone dressings and round stone coping. The wall is about 100 metres (330 ft) long and 1 metre (3 ft 3 in) high. It contains a square end pier with a pyramidal stone cap, two square gate piers, one with a lozenge-decorated cap and a globe finial, and the other with an ovoid finial. The gate is in wrought iron.	II
Harnage House; 52.63531°N 2.64533°W	—	Late 17th century	A small country house extended and remodelled in the 19th century. It is in red brick with dressings in grey sandstone and a tile roof. It has an H-shaped plan, consisting of a hall range with two storeys, and gabled cross-wings with two storeys and attics. The original part has a chamfered plinth, dentil bands, coped parapeted gable ends with globe finials. The windows are mullioned and transomed cross-windows, there is a porch with a hipped roof, and in the cross-wings are flat-topped bay windows.	II
Cottage north of Harnage House; 52.63567°N 2.64533°W	—	Late 17th century	The cottage was altered and expanded in the 19th and 20th centuries. It is built in sandstone, partly rebuilt in brick, and has a timber framed gable end with brick nogging, and a tile roof. There is one storey and an attic, three bays, and a later lean-to on the left. On the front is a lean-to sandstone porch, the windows are casements with segmental heads, and on the roof is a weathervane.	II
Upper Cound House; 52.64022°N 2.66460°W	—	Late 17th century	The house was extended and altered in the 18th and 19th centuries. The original part is timber framed with brick nogging on a sandstone plinth, the rebuilding and extensions are in red brick, and the roof is partly tiled, and partly hipped in slate. The front has one storey, a basement and an attic, and at the rear are two storeys. The house has an H-shaped plan, with a hall range of two or three bays, projecting cross-wings, and a later extension to the southeast. Most of the windows are casements, and there are dormers, some gabled, and some with flat roofs.	II
Former cottages, Venusbank; 52.63567°N 2.64533°W	—	Late 17th century	The cottage, later used for other purposes, is timber framed with brick noging and a tile roof. There is one storey and an attic, and two bays. The cottage has a door and a loft door.	II
Farm buildings south of Butlers House; 52.63383°N 2.64191°W	—	Late 17th or early 18th century	The farm buildings are timber framed with red brick nogging and weatherboarding on a grey sandstone plinth and have tile roofs. They have one storey and lofts, and consist of a four bay barn, and a range of cow sheds and a cart house at right angles. They contain doorways, casement windows, a loft door, and external steps leading up to the loft.	II
Church Lane Cottage; 52.64001°N 2.65968°W	—	Late 17th or early 18th century	The cottage is timber framed with a tile roof. It has one storey and an attic, two bays, and a 20th-century single-storey brick extension recessed to the left. On the front is a gabled wooden porch, the windows are casements, and there are two gabled dormers.	II
Glebe Farmhouse; 52.63893°N 2.66138°W	—	1701	The farmhouse incorporates material from an earlier timber framed house, later encased and extended in red brick, and with machine tile roofs. It has two storeys, a U-shaped plan, and a dentil eaves cornice. The oldest part is the central range, with two gabled cross-wings, the 1701 wing to the northeast, and the southwest wing added in the 19th century. The gable ends of the 1701 range are parapeted, and contain the ledges of a former dovecote, a sundial, and a datestone. Most of the windows are casement windows with segmental heads.	II
Cound Hall; 52.64369°N 2.65086°W	—	1703–04	A country house in brick with Grinshill sandstone dressings, bands, a dentilled cornice, and a hipped slate roof. It has a double-pile plan, three storeys, a basement and attics, and a front of nine bays with five bays on the sides. A service wing was added to the northeast in about 1800. On the front are giant fluted Corinthian pilasters on rusticated pedestals, with an architrave, a frieze with carved lions, a cornice, and a parapet with balustrades. On the east front is a timber pediment above the three central bays. The windows are sashes, and there are segmental-headed dormers. Steps lead up to the central doorway that has panelled pilasters, a fanlight, carved consoles, and an open segmental pediment containing an armorial shield.	I
Cound Stank Bridge; 52.64484°N 2.66957°W		Early 18th century	The bridge carries a road over the Cound Brook. It is in red sandstone, and consists of two segmental arches with triangular cutwaters. The bridge has rusticated voussoirs, central and end piers, and a moulded cornice and parapet. On the parapets are datestones.	II
Dovecote; 52.64123°N 2.65354°W	—	Early 18th century	The dovecote is in the churchyard of St Peter's Church. It is in red brick with grey sandstone dressings, a dentil eaves cornice, and a pyramidal tile roof. The dovecote has an octagonal plan, two storeys, and an octagonal glover with shaped openings and a lead cap. In the south front is a round-arched doorway with impost blocks, and above it is a segmental-headed doorway, both with triple keystones.	II
Riverside Inn; 52.64135°N 2.63617°W		Early 18th century	A house, later a public house, in brick on a stone plinth, with chamfered quoins, a dentilled eaves cornice, and tile roofs. It has two storeys and attics, and a U-shaped plan plus extensions. The north front has three bays and a central doorway with pilasters, a moulded cornice, and a radial fanlight. The south front has five bays, a central gable and projecting gabled wings. Most of the windows are casements, there are some sash windows, and three gabled eaves dormers.	II
Dovecote to southeast of Golding; 52.62663°N 2.67507°W	—	Early to mid 18th century	The dovecote is in red brick with grey sandstone dressings, a dentil eaves cornice, and a pyramidal tile roof. It has a hexagonal plan, two storeys, and a wooden hexagonal glover with shaped openings and a lead cap with a spiked finial. There is a circular loft opening, square windows and two segmental-headed doorways.	II
Cross base 52.64076°N 2.65441°W	—	18th century (probable)	The cross base is in the churchyard of St Peter's Church, and may have earlier origins. It is in sandstone, and consists of four circular steps with moulded nosings. On the top is a square socket.	II
Stable and granary to northeast of Golding; 52.62704°N 2.67501°W	—	Mid 18th century	The granary was added to the west in the 19th century. The building is in red brick with a concrete tile roof. There is one storey and a loft, a weathervane, windows and doorways with segmental heads, an external staircase, a gabled half-dormer, and hoist lift door.	II
Terrace wall, Golding; 52.62654°N 2.67561°W	—	18th century (probable)	The terrace retaining wall is in brick and has a U-shaped plan. It is about 35 metres (115 ft) long and 3 metres (9.8 ft) high, and has buttresses.	II
Garden wall east of Harnage Grange; 52.61596°N 2.63630°W	—	18th century	The garden wall was partly rebuilt to the north in the 19th century. It is about 15 metres (49 ft) long, and between 1 metre (3 ft 3 in) and 2 metres (6 ft 7 in) high.	II
Milestone north of Harnage Grange; 52.61670°N 2.63803°W	—	Mid 18th century	The milestone is set into a sandstone wall. It is in sandstone with a segmental top, and is inscribed with the distance in miles from "Salop" (Shrewsbury).	II
Milestone west of Harnage House; 52.63545°N 2.64620°W	—	Mid 18th century	The milestone is set into a low stone wall. It is in grey sandstone with a segmental top, and is inscribed with the distance in miles from "Salop" (Shrewsbury).	II
Pump northeast of Glebe Farmhouse; 52.63897°N 2.66129°W	—	Late 18th century (probable)	The pump is in cast iron. It has a pain shaft and top with moulded rings, a plain spout, a domed cap, and a plain curved handle.	II
Cound Arbour Bridge; 52.64309°N 2.65867°W		1797	The bridge carries a road over Cound Brook. It is in cast iron, and consists of a single elliptical arch with four ribs, panelled and circular-pierced spandrels, and an inscribed keystone. The abutments are in grey sandstone with square end piers, and there is a cast iron Gothic balustrade with curved stanchions and a moulded handrail.	II*
Colt memorial 52.64089°N 2.65413°W	—	1810	The memorial is in the churchyard of St Peter's Church, and is to the memory of Sir John Colt. It is a chest tomb in grey sandstone, and has a reeded plinth, side panels and raised oval end panels with flanking reeded pilaster strips, a moulded cornice, and a flat top.	II
Phipps memorial 52.64072°N 2.65425°W	—	1815	The memorial is in the churchyard of St Peter's Church, and is to the memory of Thomas Phipps. It is a chest tomb in sandstone, and has a plinth, side and end panels, a moulded cornice, and a chamfered top.	II
Mosterley Farmhouse; 52.62058°N 2.65051°W	—	1820	The farmhouse is in sandstone with a hipped slate roof. There are three storeys, and a square plan with sides of three bays. The central door has a segmental head and a keystone. This is flanked by canted bay windows, and the other windows are casements. Above the central upper floor window is a datestone. To the left is a recessed extension with two storeys and one bay.	II
Dodson memorial 52.64090°N 2.65397°W	—	1831	The memorial is in the churchyard of St Peter's Church, and is to the memory of John Dodson. It is a chest tomb in sandstone, and has a moulded plinth, side and end panels, a moulded cornice, and a chamfered top.	II
Milepost north of Venusbank; 52.64996°N 2.66068°W		Early to mid 19th century	The milepost is in cast iron, and has triangular section and a chamfered top. It is inscribed with the distances in miles to Much Wenlock, Salop (Shrewsbury), and Bridgnorth.	II
Cowhouses to northwest of Harnage Grange; 52.61639°N 2.63881°W	—	Mid to late 19th century	The cowhouses are in red brick on a sandstone plinth with tile roofs. They have two ranges forming an L-shaped plan, and have one storey and a loft. They contain doorways and casement windows with segmental heads, gabled eaves dormers, and narrow vents.	II
Pump to southwest of Yew Tree Cottage; 52.63991°N 2.66288°W	—	Mid to late 19th century	The pump is in cast iron. It has a fluted shaft with a splayed spout, a fluted top, a fluted domed cap with a spike finial, and a curved handle.	II
Pump and trough, Brookside Cottage; 52.64108°N 2.66156°W	—	Late 19th century	The pump is in cast iron, and has a plain shaft with moulded rings, a plain spout, and a curved handle. The trough is rectangular and in grey sandstone.	II
Pump and wall to north-west of Harnage House; 52.63541°N 2.64539°W	—	Late 19th century (probable)	The pump is in cast iron, and is a crankshaft driving pump set vertically beneath a large flywheel and two handles. It has an inscribed cast iron plate, and is enclosed on three sides by a grey sandstone wall.	II
Cound War Memorial; 52.64264°N 2.65832°W		1920	The war memorial stands in a triangular site at a road junction, and was designed by George Jack with sculpture by Laurence A. Turner. It is in limestone, and consists of a Calvary on an octagonal column. This stands on a stepped base with inscriptions and the names of those lost in the two World Wars.	II
