= Cound =

Village in Shropshire, England

Coordinates: 52.646°N 2.655°W

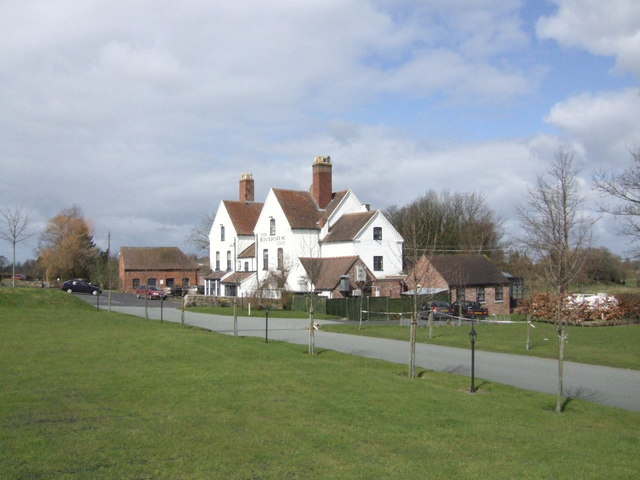
- The Riverside Inn at Upper Cound, originally Cound halt on the Severn Valley Railway and built in 1862. Although unseen from this view, the original road and railway ran at what is now the rear of the building. The building is Grade II listed.

- Location within Shropshire
- Population: 476 (2011)
- OS grid reference: SJ559051
- Civil parish: Cound
- Unitary authority: Shropshire
- Ceremonial county: Shropshire
- Region: West Midlands
- Country: England
- Sovereign state: United Kingdom
- Post town: SHREWSBURY
- Postcode district: SY5
- Dialling code: 01743
- Police: West Mercia
- Fire: Shropshire
- Ambulance: West Midlands
- UK Parliament: Shrewsbury and Atcham

Cound /kuːnd/ is a village and civil parish on the west bank of the River Severn in Shropshire, England. It is 7 miles (11 kilometres) south east of Shrewsbury.

== Etymology ==
Locally the village name is pronounced "COOnd" (rhymes with spooned or crooned) although those local residents who have Cound as their surname usually pronounce it as "COWnd" (rhymes with pound or hound.)

== Parish area ==
Whilst occupying a relatively large area, the parish is actually made up of four much smaller communities. Coundarbour, a dispersed group of dwellings located just off the A458 road, Cound and Upper Cound all relatively closely together, but with Cound Moor set some 2 miles (3.2 km) further south. Cound is a very small collection of dwellings and farms. The northern half of Cound with the church and Cound Hall are within a designated Area of Special Landscape Character and Coundmoor is a linear collection of dwellings and bungalows on the back road to Harnage Grange and Acton Burnell. There are 51 buildings, monuments, bridges, walls and milestones carrying Listed building status within the parish. Most are Grade II with only Cound Hall and the church as Grade I.

== History ==
=== Prehistoric and Roman ===
Cound has been occupied since the Late Neolithic and Early Bronze Age and small artefacts from these periods have been discovered in considerable numbers.

During the warmer and milder weather of the Iron Age, the Roman period and into the early medieval period Cound remained important as a busy crossing point for the River Severn, as the lower rainfalls meant that the river flow was much less than it is today. The several meanders at Cound created ideal slow running and shallow fording points. An important Roman road has been identified as passing through Cound on its way to the 1st century Roman legionary fortress at Uriconium, following the alignment of the road between the A458 and Cound Stank. This may have provided a route for Roman soldiers travelling to or from another major fortified settlement at Isca Augusta (modern day Caerleon) or into the Welsh Marches .

Remains have been identified near to the modern Cound Hall of a Roman marching camp that may predate Uriconium. Only the eastern corner-angle, a short length of the north-east side and a longer piece of the south-eastern defence ditch of this camp have been excavated. The only gap in the identified rampart occurs at a point where the underlying geology is suspect and this has not yet been positively identified as a gateway. However, there are suggestions that the north-westerly side would not have been much over 180m distant from the south-eastern ramparts. The location of the missing south-west extremity has not yet been found.

=== A medieval forest ===
After the Norman Conquest of 1066, most of southern Shropshire, including the manor of Cound, was set aside as a Royal forest and game hunting grounds under special jurisdiction of a Shire reeve, or Sheriff as they came to be known. Although game was hunted throughout the Shropshire Long Forest, as it was called, there is documentary evidence that Cound was a special hunting reserve for the Norman royalty. A T Gaydon reported in Victoria County History 8: Condover and Ford Hundreds (1968) that:-

"Several historical records have identified a deer park of medieval dates in Cound, between 1066 and 1499, within the Royal Forest. It may have been formed soon after 1254 when a 'grant of free warren' was enacted and was still in operation in 1298. The medieval hunting park included stocks of free ranging deer together with wild boar and seems to have lain in the area of Longdole Coppice, north of the present day Cound Hall and the main road near the western banks of the River Severn."

In the 13th century the high quality of Shropshire wool brought prosperity to Ludlow, Shrewsbury, and Bridgnorth, as the main centres. Shrewsbury in particular became the principal market for an extensive area including much of North Wales and the Shropshire plains. The original Cound Manor House is thought to have been built around this time. The farm buildings of the present Cound Hall lie just to the south of the walled kitchen garden and are believed to be standing on the site of the first medieval manor house. If this identification is correct the farm buildings may represent part of the surviving plan elements of the earlier manorial enclosure. They may have stood on the then main road, with the manor house set back to the north behind them. There is some map evidence, however, to suggest that the road formerly followed a slightly southerly route, diverging from the modern alignment (and at that time passing north of the former Cound Lodge Inn, now the Riverside) to pass adjacent to Cound Cottage (formerly Cound Villa) and then running along the northern side of the lake at Cound Hall. The Victoria County History suggests relic bridge abutments were present on the Cound Brook slightly south of the modern A458 bridge over the brook but these are not visible today. If there was a bridge alignment in that position then it is possible that the road joined back with the modern A458 alignment near the modern day junction at Cound Arbour, but that is conjecture, and a southerly alignment of the road remains uncertain.

=== Iron bridges ===
The dispersed settlement of Cound is split in two by the Coundmoor Brook and the earliest part of the village is considered to be where the church still stands. Coundarbour bridge was built over the Cound Brook immediately downstream of its confluence with the Coundmoor Brook by the renowned engineer Thomas Telford in 1797, and remains the oldest iron bridge still in vehicular use anywhere in the world. The confluence of the Severn and the Cound Brook is upstream of Ironbridge Gorge and it is not surprising that when Telford, then Road Engineer to Shropshire County, designed two bridges to cross the brook he also used the latest materials, from a local industry, to build them. The Coundarbour bridge with its stone buttresses is found by approaching Cound along the A458. (Telford's second and much later bridge across the Cound Brook, the Cantlop bridge is a few miles away in Berrington parish, built in 1820 and no longer in use but maintained as a monument by English Heritage.)

=== Cound Hall ===
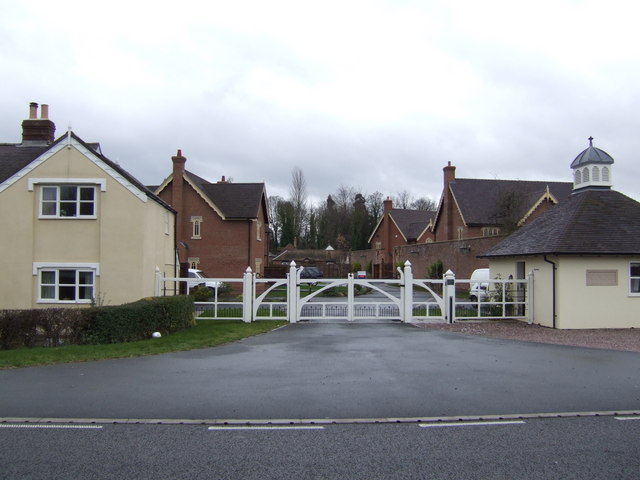
The new gated housing estate next to Cound Hall Gatehouse

The surviving manor house of Cound Hall is a Grade I listed building and a large vernacular Baroque house, with a basement and two storeys of tall slender windows topped by a half-storey, built of red brick with stone dressings. The house was built in 1703-04 for Edward Cressett by a John Prince. Historian Howard Colvin in his book A Biographical Dictionary of British Architects, 1600–1840, 3rd ed. 1995, p 781, suggests that this Prince is the same John Prince of Shrewsbury who acted as agent and surveyor to Edward Harley in the designing of the Harley estate in Marylebone, London.

The house is most notable for its large stop-fluted Corinthian pilasters with richly carved capitals, which have been described as "ambitious but inept" and suggestions are that the inspiration was the King William block at Greenwich Hospital that was designed by Christopher Wren.

One outstanding feature of the interior is the staircase, a fascinating alteration which has been dated to the late 18th century. The concept of the staircase was to gain more room where the original staircase had been, thus creating a feeling of greater space in the hallway. The staircase has a delicate metal handrail and runs through both storeys along three sides of an open well. The staircase rests on two beautiful fluted columns. There is light Neo-Elizabethan plaster work on the underside of the staircase.

There is a Grade II listed dovecote built in the 18th century and still standing in the grounds of the hall. The dovecote was originally sited as the main focus at the end of the grand entrance driveway.

Ownership of Cound Hall passed from the Cressett family to the Thursby-Pelham family by marriage and inheritance; then to the McCorquodale family – into which the young Barbara Cartland married; she lived at the Hall for some years in the late 1920s/early 1930s whilst married to Alexander McCorquodale.

In the 1960s, the then owner (Morris) divided the house into rented flats, and it was tenanted in this way until 1981, as gradually the building deteriorated and the tenants left. The hall then stood empty and derelict for 15 years, until the current owners (the Waller family) bought the house as a virtual wreck in 1996 with the intention of restoring it.

In 2004 it featured in the BBC TV programme, "Restoration" but was unsuccessful in the public competition for funds to renovate the building. English Heritage was most concerned about the building's continuing deterioration at that time, and placed the Hall on its At risk register. However, through building a new estate of houses, inside the gatehouse entrance on the east side of the estate, they raised sufficient funds to rescue the house. The Hall was now almost fully restored by 2008 and is inhabited as a family house once again.

=== A river port and railway ===
What is now the Riverside Inn, formerly the Cound Lodge Inn, on the A458 was built as a house in the early 18th century facing the river Severn and is listed Grade 2. It was an alehouse by 1745 serving turnpike traffic on the road which then ran between the inn and the river and would have also served boatmen on the river which at that time was a thriving waterway with a wharf at the location. The Shrewsbury-Much Wenlock road was diverted to its current alignment to the south of the building at some time before the construction of the Severn Valley Railway line (now disused) in 1862 and hence the former back of the house (south) has become the entrance front.

The building of the railway line and station commenced in 1858 and opened for trade in 1862 but never handled much in the way of passengers, mostly specialising in freight traffic. Mainly wool skeins, agricultural produce and specifically coal, from the busy collieries of Alveley and Highley, were the principal sources of revenue. The railway was closed in 1963 as an early casualty of the Beeching Axe. A station was provided at Cound in 1934 at Cound Halt on a continuation of the Severn Valley Railway from Ironbridge to Shrewsbury. Cound station was halfway between the stations at Cressage and Berrington at the point where the railway skirted adjacent to the River Severn. Although the railway was closed as a result of the Beeching cuts, the station had been previously scheduled for closure and was closed in 1963 before the publication of the inaugural Beeching report.

== Cound today ==
The Cound Trout Fishery occupies a worked out and flooded sand and gravel quarry works alongside the main road. Upper Cound is a more compact group of dwellings and farms. Three new dwellings have been built opposite Cound Farm on a previously allocated housing site and there are plans entered for residential conversions of adjacent farm buildings.

After lengthy negotiations with English Heritage and local planning authorities several high value executive houses have been built in the Hall's grounds with a secure gated entrance between the estate's original gatehouses.

== Governance ==
=== Parish ===
Cound parish council has nine elected members.

=== County ===
Cound lies within an electoral division of Shropshire Council.

=== Westminster ===
Cound is within the Shrewsbury and Atcham parliamentary constituency, represented since 2024 by Julia Buckley of the Labour Party.

== Geography ==
=== Waterway ===
The village of Cound is situated on a low lying flood plain on the west bank of the River Severn and at the northern end of the Shropshire-Severn plain. The various settlements that make up the village are bisected by the Cound Brook, an important local tributary of the River Severn, which rises in the Stretton Hills some fifteen miles distant to the south west, although the many meanders of the brook entails a passage of closer to twenty five miles before its confluence near Eyton on Severn. The Coundmoor Brook joins the Cound Brook immediately upstream of iron Cound Arbour Bridge.

=== Geology ===
Cound stands to the east of an outcropping spur, consisting of a Pre-Cambrian limestone and sandstone sedimentary rock extension of the Longmyndian range, intruding into the Shropshire-Severn plain with major appearances at Longden, Lyth Hill, Bayston Hill, and Sharpstone Hill. North of the river Severn it does not outcrop again until it appears east of Shrewsbury as Haughmond Hill.

The sediments that make up Coundmoor and the flood plain were laid down under a vast warm ocean, surrounded by many volcanoes that were ground down by later Ice Age glaciers, around 18,000 years ago, which provided the fertile soil that contributed to Cound becoming a successful farming community throughout medieval times. The soils have been further enriched through regular flooding by the Severn and the Cound Brook, depositing enriched silts. There are still several active geological fault lines underlying the area and on 2 April 1990 Cound experienced an earthquake, measuring 5.4 on the Richter Scale, that was centred on Bishop's Castle.

The village lies just six miles south east of Shrewsbury and is separated from the county town by the main A5 Trunk road. It has good road transport links with easy access to both the A49 and A5. To the west lies the pre-cambrian Lyth Hill, with Sharpstone Hill standing to the north west, the latter now mostly a major sandstone quarry with little of the hill itself now remaining after several hundred years of constant quarrying activities.

=== Sandstone quarrying and gravel sink holes ===
There are many small sand and gravel quarries located around the village, although the area is still very rural. Cound's own gravel sink hole pit is now established as a lake fed by its own spring source and is run as the commercial Cound Trout Fishery, occupying a redundant quarry works alongside the main road.

== Education ==
Cound has no schools within the parish.

=== Primary ===
Most junior children attend Christchurch School, Cressage or Condover Primary School, both Church of England coeducational schools.

=== Secondary ===
Children over the age of eleven are bussed to attend a range of secondary schools in nearby Shrewsbury, Much Wenlock or Church Stretton and the sixth form college in Shrewsbury.

== Religious sites ==
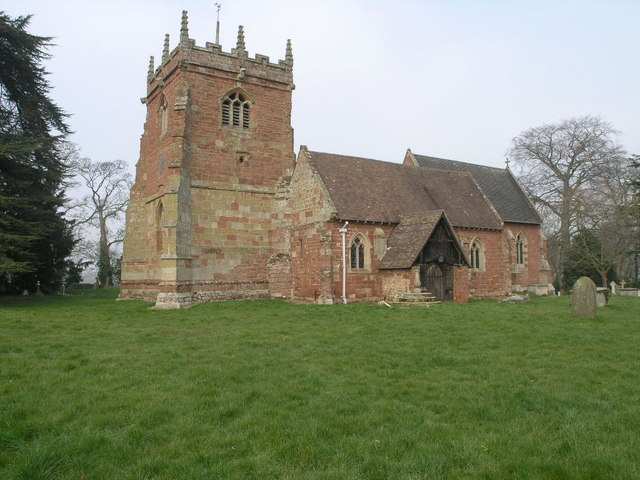
Church of St Peter at Cound

The Anglican St Peter's Church is Grade I listed, standing in the grounds of Cound Hall and was maintained as a family chapel by the various Lords of the Manor. A wooded avenue was constructed as a walkway across the grounds from Cound Hall to the church in the mid 19th century. Archeological fieldwork in 1990 identified the possible remains of the now severely eroded causeway associated with it.

The church structure mostly dates from the mid 14th century but has several later additions, right up to the north aisle and chancel that have been dated to the Victorian era. The font however has been confirmed as being original 12th century (Norman) and has probably been in place since the church was first built.

There are many funerary monuments and grave markings in the churchyard that have been granted Listed status in their own right. Most of the church is constructed with red and yellow sandstone quarried locally at Berriewood, in Condover parish.

=== War memorial ===
Cound parish's outdoor War Memorial, consisting of a crucifix on an octagonal column and stepped plinth, which stands on a triangular plot at a road junction in the village, was unveiled in 1920. It was designed by George Jack and sculptured by Laurence Turner. It is Grade II Listed.

== Sport ==
=== Cound Cricket Club ===
Cound Cricket Club has existed in one form or another since the early 1880s. In 1984 a club member discovered an old Parish Magazine showing a Cound Cricket Club scorecard for a cricket match played at Cound in the early 1880s. It is believed that the ground at that time was in a field on the far side of the Church near Cound Brook. A fund raising concert was held in the Guildhall, Cound on the evening of Thursday 28 November 1889 whereby the sum of £5. 10 shillings (approximately £5,500 when adjusted for inflation in 2008) was raised for the Cricket Club.

Sometime around 1900 the existing Pavilion and Ground was provided by the owners of Cound Hall for the estate's workmen who formed the village cricket team. At that time most of the local villages had cricket teams but sadly over the years substantial numbers have disappeared. On Saturday 15 July 1905 Cound entertained a team from Newton-Le-Willows, Lancashire, a team that included a Mr Dowson who had also played for Surrey and all England.

During the winter of 1905/1906 a new cricket square was laid on its current site through the generosity of then President A.C. McCorquodale. In 1955 the club was able to raise sufficient monies to purchase the ground outright from the Cound Estate.

As of 2008 Cound CC field 2 teams in the Shropshire Cricket League, the 1st playing in Division 1 and the 2nd XI winning promotion to Division 3. The club also has a mid-week team, and a thriving junior section. The club improved facilities with the addition of new changing facilities in August 2006. In the season practice nights are on a Monday for the seniors and Thursdays for the juniors.

== Cound in the media ==
Cound Hall featured in one-off BBC feature Fast Show special, Ted and Ralph in December 1998, where it starred as Ralph's ancestral home.

In 2004, during the period that Cound Hall stood empty and increasingly derelict it also featured in the BBC programme Restoration but was unsuccessful in the public competition for funds to renovate the building. Fortunately, funds were subsequently raised by building new houses within the grounds of the Hall and it has been now almost fully restored and is inhabited once again.

In 2010, 2 episodes of the BBC programme "Songs of Praise" were recorded from the church of St. Peter in Cound. One episode (broadcast in December 2010) saw the church and congregation in Edwardian dress and featured an Edwardian themed Christmas concert. The second episode (broadcast in Lent 2011) sees the church in a more modern light with an "up-to-date" service.

== Notable people ==
- Sir Thomas Lodge (Lord Mayor of London) was born at Cound about 1509.
- Edward Cressett, son of the original Lord of the Manor at Cound Hall, served as Dean of Hereford Cathedral before being ordained as Bishop of Llandaff between 1748 and 1754 (Jonathan Humphries, Cound Hall Past and Present, 1989).
- Barbara Cartland (1901–2000), romantic novelist, lived at Cound Hall during her first marriage (to Alexander McCorquodale).

== See also ==
- Listed buildings in Cound
- Cound Brook
- Condover
- Severn Valley Railway
