= St Peter's Church, Cound =

Coordinates: 52.6409°N 2.6543°W

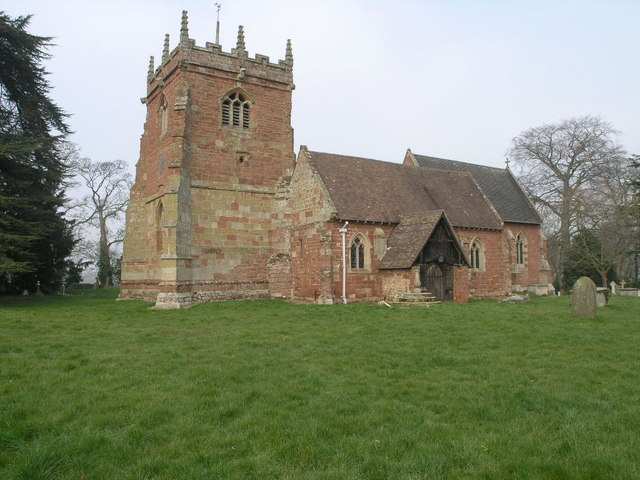
- St Peter's Church, Cound, from the southwest

- Location in Shropshire
- OS grid reference: SJ 558,050
- Location: Cound, Shropshire
- Country: England
- Denomination: Anglican
- Website: Wenlock Benefice

History
- Status: Parish church

Architecture
- Functional status: Active
- Heritage designation: Grade I
- Designated: 13 June 1968
- Architect(s): S. Pountney Smith; Paley and Austin
- Architectural type: Church
- Style: Gothic, Gothic Revival
- Completed: 1891

Specifications
- Materials: Sandstone, tiled roofs

Administration
- Province: Canterbury
- Diocese: Hereford
- Archdeaconry: Ludlow
- Deanery: Condover
- Parish: Cound

Clergy
- Priest: Revd Judy Davies

St Peter's Church is in the grounds of Cound Hall, Cound, Shropshire, England. It is an active Anglican parish church in the deanery of Condover, the archdeaconry of Ludlow, and the diocese of Hereford. Its benefice is united with those of 13 other parishes to form the benefice of Wenlock. The church is recorded in the National Heritage List for England as a designated Grade I listed building.

== History ==
The church is dedicated to Saint Peter because of its medieval association with Shrewsbury Abbey, which is dedicated to Saints Peter and Paul. The oldest part of the church is the nave, which dates from the 13th century. The south aisle was built at the same time, but rebuilt during the following century. The west tower was added in the 15th century. In 1841 or 1842 the north aisle was built, and the nave and south aisle were restored. In 1862 the chancel was built at the expense of Revd Henry Thursby-Pelham, of Cound Hall. Both the north aisle and the chancel were designed by the Shrewsbury architect S. Pountney Smith. In 1889–91 the north vestry was added, re-using the 13th-century priest's door, the architects being Paley and Austin of Lancaster.

== Architecture ==
=== Exterior ===
The church is constructed in red and yellow sandstone. In the older parts of the building the colours are used randomly, and the 19th-century additions they are deliberately arranged. The roof is tiled. The plan of the church consists of a four bay nave, a three-bay south aisle with a porch, a four-bay north aisle, a four-bay chancel rising to a higher level, and a west tower. The tower is in two stages: it stands on a plinth, and its features include diagonal buttresses, a three-light west window, a northeast stair turret, a clock face on the west side, gargoyles, three-light bell openings, and a battlemented parapet with eight pinnacles. On the summit of the tower is a pyramidal cap with a weathervane. On the side of the south aisle is a doorway and two-light windows; the east window has three lights. The windows along the side of the north aisle also have two lights; at its west end is a rectangular window and, above it in the gable, is a small quatrefoil window. The windows on the side of the chancel have two lights, and its east window is large, with five lights. There is a doorway on the south side of the chancel. In the north vestry are two-light windows and a rose window.

=== Interior ===
The arcades are carried on circular piers. In the south aisle are a piscina and an aumbry. The font is Norman, dating from the 12th century; it is tub-shaped and carved with rosettes and foliage. The pulpit is dated 1633, and is carved with colonnettes and panels. The tower screen was formerly in the chancel; it is painted with the Creed, the Lord's Prayer, and the Ten Commandments. In the chancel are re-used medieval tiles. Over the chancel arch is part of a 15th-century wall painting of the Last Judgement. The stained glass includes a small 14th-century figure in the east window of the south aisle. The east window of the chancel contains glass of 1891 by Kempe, and in the south aisle is a window of 1909 by Herbert Bryans. On the walls of the church are monuments, the oldest being dated 1736. On the north wall of the chancel is the monument of Edward Cressett, Bishop of Llandaff, who died in 1755. The two-manual pipe organ was built in the 1890s by Henry Fincham, and overhauled in 1968 by Peter Hutchins. There is a ring of six bells, all cast in 1726 by Abraham Rudhall II.

== External features ==
In the churchyard are five structures, each of which is listed at Grade II. To the south of the church is a sandstone chest tomb dated 1815 to the memory of Thomas Phipps. To the east of this is another sandstone chest tomb; this is dated 1831, and is a memorial to John Dodson. Nearby is the chest tomb of Sir John Colt; it is also in sandstone, and is dated 1810. To the northeast of the church is an 18th-century dovecote. This is a two-storey structure with an octagonal plan, in red brick with sandstone dressings and a tiled pyramidal roof. Inside its walls are nesting boxes. To the southeast of the church is a sandstone cross base dating from the 18th century or earlier. It consists of four circular steps with a square socket. The churchyard contains three war graves of British soldiers of World War I. Also buried here is Admiral Sir Cecil Thursby (1861-1936), who saw distinguished service in the same war.

== See also ==
- Grade I listed churches in Shropshire
- Listed buildings in Cound
