= Listed buildings in Cressage =

Cressage is a civil parish in Shropshire, England. It contains 18 listed buildings that are recorded in the National Heritage List for England. Of these, one is at Grade II*, the middle of the three grades, and the others are at Grade II, the lowest grade. The parish contains the village of Cressage and the surrounding countryside. Most of the listed buildings are timber framed houses, cottages, farmhouses, and farm buildings dating from the 16th and 17th centuries. The other listed buildings include a former manor house and its stable block, a church, a milepost, a public house, and a war memorial.

== Key ==
Grade	Criteria
II*	Particularly important buildings of more than special interest
II	Buildings of national importance and special interest

== Buildings ==
Name and location	Photograph	Date	Notes	Grade
Belswardyne Hall; 52.62584°N 2.58827°W	—	c. 1540	A manor house. later used for other purposes, it was remodelled in the late 18th century, and considerably altered in about 1890. The earliest parts are timber framed, the additions are in red brick, and the roof is tiled. It has two storeys with attics and cellars, and a complex H-shaped plan. The house originated as a hall and cross-wing, a stair turret was added in the angle, and the later extensions are at the northeast and the rear. The porch is in Classical style, with four unfluted Greek Doric columns. Most of the windows are mullioned and transomed, and there is a sash window in the stair turret.	II*
Old Porch House; 52.63260°N 2.60755°W	—	Late 16th century	A farmhouse, later a private house, that was extended in the 19th and 20th centuries. The original part is timber framed with plaster infill on a rendered plinth, partly refaced and rebuilt in brick, with extensions in brick, and with tile roofs. There are two storeys and attics, originally a three-bay hall range and a two-bay cross-wing, with extensions in the angle. On the front is a two-storey gabled porch, the gable jettied on corner brackets. On the north front are canted bay windows, between which is a verandah. The windows are sashes, and there are gabled dormers.	II
The Eagles Inn; 52.63328°N 2.60467°W		Late 16th to early 17th century	The building originated as a house, it has been extended in a number of phases, and converted into a public house. The earlier part has a timber framed core, with infill in lath and plaster and brick, on the front facing the road is some tile-hanging, the extensions are mainly in brick, and the building is partly rendered. The roof is tiled, there is an irregular plan, the older part has one storey and an attic, and the later part has two storeys. The windows are replacements, and there is a dormer.	II
Old Crown House; 52.63238°N 2.60699°W	—	Early 17th century	A farmhouse, then an inn, and later a private house, it was extended in the 19th century. The house is timber framed with brick infill on a brick plinth, and has a tile roof. There is one storey and an attic. Originally a two-bay hall range with a one-bay cross-wing, it was extended to form a T-shaped plan. The windows are casements, and attached to the rear wall is a 19th-century cast iron pump.	II
Shore Cottage; 52.63317°N 2.60765°W	—	Early 17th century	The cottage is timber framed with brick infill on a rendered stone plinth, and has a machine tile roof. There is one storey and an attic, and three bays. The windows are casements, and there are two gabled eaves dormers.	II
12 Harley Road; 52.63187°N 2.60459°W	—	17th century	The house was extended to the rear in the 19th century. It is timber framed with brick infill on a rendered plinth, and has a half-hipped tile roof. There is one storey and an attic. Originally it had three bays, the left bay has been truncated and partly rebuilt in brick, and the rear extension is also in brick. The windows are casements, and there is a small fixed window.	II
4 Shrewsbury Road; 52.63402°N 2.60759°W	—	17th century	The house was later altered and extended. The original part is timber framed with plaster and brick infill, the extensions are in brick, and the roof is tiled. It has one storey and attics, the original part consists of a two-bay hall range and a cross-wing projecting on the left. There is a gabled extension in the angle, and an extension to the right of the hall range. The windows are casements, and there are gabled dormers.	II
Gate House Cottage and Old Hall Cottage; 52.63384°N 2.60442°W		17th century	A house later divided into two cottages, it is timber framed with brick infill and a tile roof. It has one storey and an attic, and three bays, with later extensions. Most of the windows are casements, and there are three gabled eaves dormers.	II
Cottage west of Old Porch House; 52.63274°N 2.60774°W	—	Mid 17th century (probable)	The cottage is timber framed with plaster and brick infill on a stone plinth, and has a tile roof. There is one storey and an attic, and two bays, and later lean-to extensions. The windows are casements.	II
The Old Hall; 52.63432°N 2.60366°W	—	17th century	A farmhouse, later a hotel, it was much altered in the 19th and 20th centuries. It is timber framed with plaster and brick infill on a brick plinth, and has roofs of tile and sandstone slate. There are two storeys and attics, and an H-shaped plan. Most of the windows are casements, there is a gabled dormer, and a canted projection that has a sash window with Gothic glazing.	II
The Old Post Office; 52.63243°N 2.60465°W	—	17th century	The house is timber framed with brick infill and a thatched roof. There is one storey and an attic, and three bays. The windows are casements, and there is a gabled eaves dormer.	II
Barn northeast of 4 Shrewsbury Road; 52.63407°N 2.60702°W	—	Late 17th century	The barn is timber framed with weatherboarding on a limestone plinth, and has a tile roof. There are three bays and corrugated iron doors.	II
Fingerpost Cottage; 52.63374°N 2.60456°W	—	Late 17th century	The cottage was extended in the 19th century. The original part is timber framed with brick infill on a brick plinth and with a tile roof, and the extension is in brick. There is one storey and an attic, two bays, and a gabled rear extension. The windows are casements.	II
Jasmine Cottage; 52.62973°N 2.60794°W	—	Late 17th century	The cottage is timber framed with plaster infill on a limestone plinth, partly rebuilt in stone, and with a thatched roof. There is one storey with an attic, and two bays. The windows are casements, and there is an eyebrow dormer.	II
Former stable block, Belswardyne Hall; 52.62611°N 2.58819°W	—	Late 18th century	The stable block was extended in the 19th century, and has since been used for other purposes. It is in red brick with machine tile roofs, and has two levels. The block is gabled, and contains arches, some segmental and some elliptical, and round-headed doorways with tympani.	II
Christ Church; 52.63229°N 2.60392°W	—	1841	The church, designed by Edward Haycock, is in Grinshill sandstone with machine tile roofs. It consists of a nave and a chancel in one cell, a shallow sanctuary, and an integral west tower. The tower has three stages, and an embattled parapet with corner pinnacles. The windows are lancets.	II
Milepost; 52.63687°N 2.61694°W		Mid to late 19th century	The milepost is on the south side of the A458 road. It is in cast iron, and consists of a triangular post with a chamfered top, and is inscribed with the distances in miles to Much Wenlock, and to locations in Salop (Shrewsbury), and in Bridgnorth.	II
Cressage War Memorial; 52.63362°N 2.60505°W		1920	The war memorial stands in the centre of a road junction. It is in Grinshill sandstone, and consists of a Celtic cross with a tapered shaft, on a platform with a single-stepped plinth. On the base is an inscribed plaque with the names of those lost in the First World War, and on the other side is an inscription and the names of those lost in the Second World War.	II
