= Cross Houses =

Coordinates: 52.662°N 2.681°W

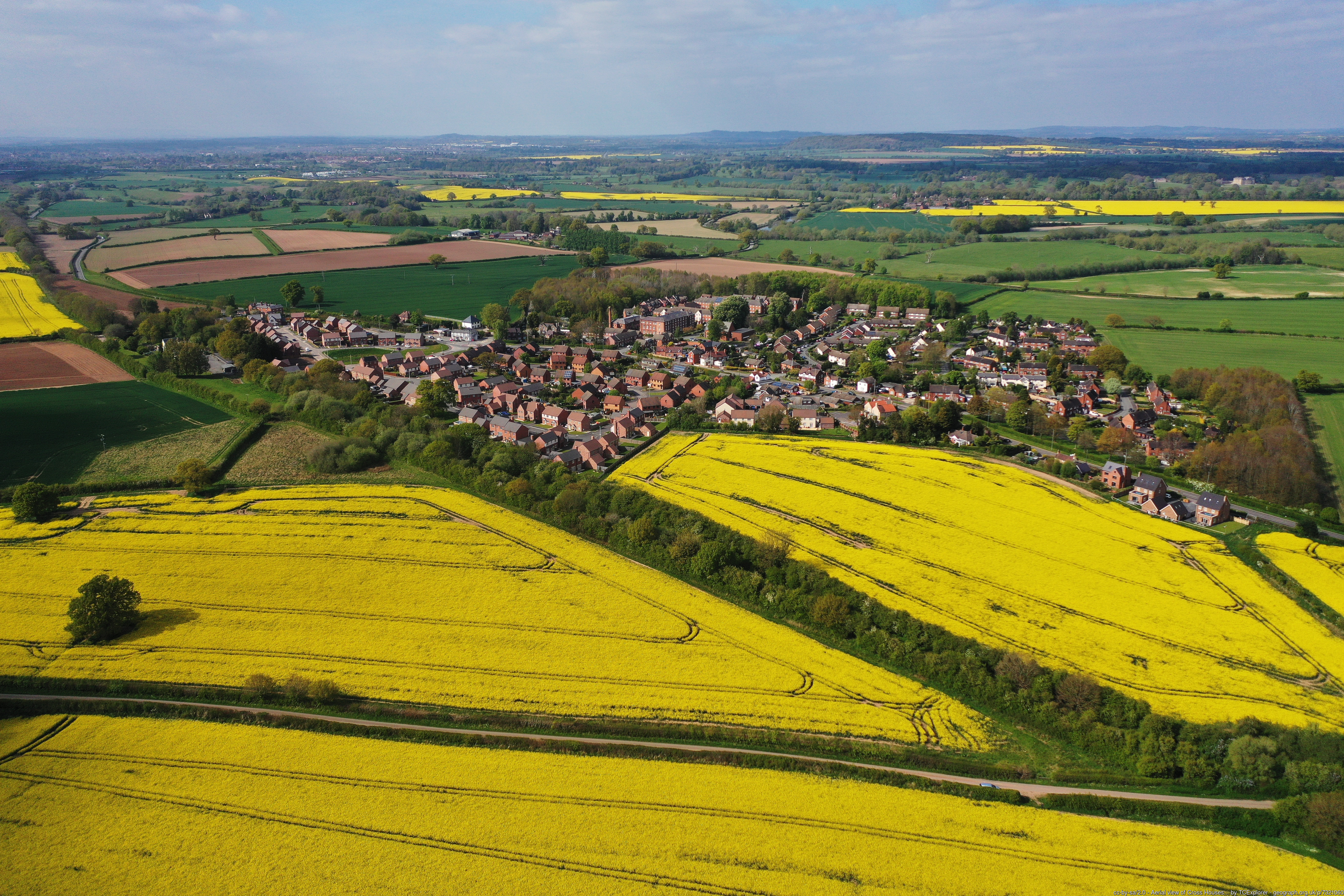
- Aerial view of Cross Houses in Spring 2022

- Location within Shropshire
- OS grid reference: SJ539073
- Civil parish: Berrington
- Unitary authority: Shropshire
- Ceremonial county: Shropshire
- Region: West Midlands
- Country: England
- Sovereign state: United Kingdom
- Post town: SHREWSBURY
- Postcode district: SY5 6
- Dialling code: 01743
- Police: West Mercia
- Fire: Shropshire
- Ambulance: West Midlands
- UK Parliament: Shrewsbury and Atcham

Cross Houses is a village in Shropshire, England, the largest village in the Parish of Berrington. It is located on the A458 road and is 4 miles south east of Shrewsbury.

Cross Houses is also the name of a hamlet south-west of Bridgnorth.

== Transport ==
It was once served by Berrington railway station, which despite the name was much closer to Cross Houses than to its namesake.

== Local businesses ==
The village has a Shop/Post Office/Petrol Station and also a pub "The Bell". The village also used to be home to a second pub "The Fox" which has since been converted into a single dwelling and a second house built in the former car park.

== Developments ==
Over the decades, Cross Houses has expanded in phases. Properties in Lower Cross were originally built as council houses in the late 1940s and early 1950s. Further social housing was added on the adjacent Noel Hill Road in the 1960s. There was little substantial change in the 1970s and 1980s, before the first phase of homes by Shrewsbury-based developer Fletcher Homes were completed in the 1990s on land immediately to the south of the A458.

The turn of the Millennium saw substantial further developments. The Chestnuts, providing 2, 3, 4 and 5 bedroom homes, was built on the site of the former Cross Houses Hospital in the early to mid 2000s. The Chestnuts development was located on the site of the old workhouse and incorporated renovation of some of the old buildings.

During 2016 work started by Fletcher Homes on a new development, known as Berrington Meadows, located on the land opposite the village shop. This development also features a selection of 3 and 4 bedroom properties. As part of this development a new roundabout was built in 2019.

Banbury Developments, a company associated with Fletcher Homes, also owns the field to the east of the existing Berrington Meadows development, where further expansion of the village is likely to take place.

== Atcham Union Workhouse/Cross Houses Hospital ==
Cross Houses has long been renowned for the hospital site, which has recently been redeveloped for housing.

The hospital was originally built as the Atcham Union Workhouse in 1793 following Atcham's incorporation under a local Act in 1792. The Incorporation was allowed under the Act to build and operate workhouses. The original building was designed by local architect John Hiram Haycock (1759–1830), and was later extended in 1851, 1871 and 1903 to increase capacity.

The part of the building that was the original Workhouse, now residential accommodation, is called Haycock House after the original architect.

In 1916, during World War I, the building became Berrington War Hospital before becoming successively a general hospital, maternity hospital and geriatric hospital after that war. The building was eventually used as NHS Trust admin offices and storage. The offices were closed in 2000 and redeveloped into modern housing.

The development, commencing in 2001, aimed to preserve the heritage of the original buildings in the workhouse complex. The original workhouse building, the kitchen/laundry block and the chapel remained where other extensions were taken down.

The chapel now houses a community centre and the former laundry and kitchen block houses offices.

Architecturally, the original Workhouse and the original laundry/kitchen block have some of the earliest cast-iron windows in the world. It is also noteworthy that "great" bricks were used in the construction of the Workhouse, reflecting the response of brick manufacturers to the brick tax.

To the north of Cross Houses lies Work House Wood – a wood strategically positioned to protect the residents of Attingham Park Mansion from views of the Workhouse.

== Art in Cross Houses ==
The history of the buildings inspired a group of artists during its redevelopment and Benchart in Cross Houses was formed. The artists developed contemporary public artworks in rural areas, recycling reclaimed materials from the site. Some of the art works include sculpted benches around the Workhouse and chapel and bus shelters built using reclaimed materials and reflecting the 'local vernacular'.

== See also ==
- Listed buildings in Berrington, Shropshire
