= Listed buildings in Berrington, Shropshire =

Berrington is a civil parish in Shropshire, England. It contains 43 listed buildings that are recorded in the National Heritage List for England. Of these, one is listed at Grade I, the highest of the three grades, two are at Grade II*, the middle grade, and the others are at Grade II, the lowest grade. The parish contains the villages of Berrington, Betton Strange, Cross Houses, and is otherwise rural. Most of the listed buildings are houses and associated structures, farmhouses and farm buildings, many of them dating from the 17th century or before, and basically timber framed. There are two listed churches, the older church All Saints Church, Berrington also having listed structures in the churchyard. In addition, the listed buildings include two bridges, a former hospital, a milestone and a milepost, a number of pumps, some with associated troughs, and a war memorial.

== Key ==
Grade	Criteria
I	Buildings of exceptional interest, sometimes considered to be internationally important
II*	Particularly important buildings of more than special interest
II	Buildings of national importance and special interest

== Buildings ==
Name and location	Photograph	Date	Notes	Grade
All Saints Church; 52.65744°N 2.69564°W		13th century	The church was altered in the following centuries, and restored in 1877 when the porch was also rebuilt. It is built in sandstone with tiled roofs, and consists of a nave, a south aisle, a south porch, a chancel and a west tower. The tower is in Perpendicular style, with two stages, diagonal buttresses, an embattled parapet and a pyramidal roof. In the porch is the re-used former 13th-century doorway of the nave.	I
Spindle Cottage; 52.66712°N 2.71593°W	—	15th century (probable)	The house is timber framed and of cruck construction with brick nogging, extensions in brick, and a tile roof with a brick ridge. It is part of a former hall house, it has two bays, one storey with an attic, and two storeys. The windows are casements, and there are two gabled half-dormers.	II
Former cottage, South Farm; 52.64796°N 2.68601°W	—	Late 16th century	The cottage, later used for other purposes, was partly rebuilt in the 19th century. The original part is timber framed with red brick nogging, the rebuilding was in red brick, and the roof is tiled. There is one storey and an attic, and two bays. It has a casement window and a central gabled dormer. Adjoining it is a 19th-century cast iron pump.	II
69 and 70 Cantlop; 52.64752°N 2.70693°W	—	17th century (probable)	A farmhouse that was extended in the 19th century, the original part is timber framed and rendered, and the extension is rendered; the roof is tiled. There are two storeys and attics, the front facing the road has two bays, and behind it is an extension, forming a T-shaped plan. On the front is a doorway with a moulded architrave, a fanlight, and a cornice. The windows are cross-windows with moulded architraves and hood moulds. In the rear wing, most of the windows are casements, there is a sash window and gabled dormers with bargeboards.	II
Barn, Manor Farm; 52.65717°N 2.69528°W		Mid 17th century	The barn was extended in the 19th century. The original part is timber framed with red brick nogging, and the extension is in red brick with a dentil eaves cornice; the roof is tiled. There are four bays, and the barn contains opposing wagon entrances. There are also doorways, loft doors, segmental-headed windows, and lozenge-shaped vents.	II
Newman Hall Cottages; 52.65031°N 2.69739°W	—	Mid 17th century	Originally a house, later divided, it was remodelled in the early 18th century, and extended in about 1900. Basically timber framed with brick nogging, it has been largely encased, rebuilt and extended in red brick. There are bands, a dentil eaves cornice, and a tile roof. The house has two storeys with an attic, and an L-shaped plan, with a two-bay front and a one-bay rear wing. The windows are casements; they and the doorway have segmental heads. At the rear are outshuts and outbuildings.	II
Manor Farmhouse; 52.65683°N 2.69567°W		1758	The farmhouse is timber framed with rendered infill on a plinth of red brick and red sandstone, partly rendered, and partly encased or rebuilt in red brick. The roof is partly in stone-slate and partly tiled. There are two storeys and attics, and the house consists of a hall flanked by cross-wings, all gabled with bargeboards and finials. The upper floor and the gables are jettied. In the left wing is a recessed porch with side benches. Most of the windows are casements, and on the right return are two flat roofed canted bay windows containing sashes.	II*
Berrington Farmhouse; 52.65750°N 2.69971°W	—	Late 17th century	The farmhouse was extended in the 18th and 19th centuries. The original part is timber framed with red brick nogging on a red sandstone plinth. It has been partly encased in red brick, the extensions are in red brick, and the roofs are tiled. The different parts have one or two storeys, some with attics. The windows are casements, and there is a canted bay window and a stair wing.	II
Coton Farmhouse; 52.65632°N 2.65221°W	—	Late 17th century	The farmhouse is in red brick with bands, and a tiled roof with parapeted gable ends. It has two storeys and an attic, and an L-shaped plan. On the front are three bays, and the windows are cross-casements.	II
Eaton Mascott Hall; 52.64832°N 2.68458°W	—	Late 17th century	A country house that was extended and remodelled in the 18th and 19th century. It is in red sandstone and red brick, rendered on the southeast front, with roofs partly of slate and partly of tile. There are two storeys with attics, and an irregular L-shaped plan. The southwest front is symmetrical with five bays, a plinth, a coped parapet, a dormer with scrolls, and an open triangular pediment. In the centre is a porch with Tuscan columns, a frieze and a cornice. The doorway has a chamfered rusticated surround with voussoirs and a keystone, flanked by Doric pilasters. In the ground floor are Venetian windows, and the other windows are sashes with architraves. On the southeast front are two full-height canted bay windows.	II
South Farmhouse; 52.64806°N 2.68611°W	—	Late 17th century	The farmhouse was extended to the north west and remodelled in the 19th century. It is in brick on a plinth of red sandstone and red brick, and has a tile roof. There are two storeys and an attic, and two parallel ranges. The gables face the road and have scalloped bargeboards and finials. In the centre is a gabled porch with scalloped bargeboards and a finial. The windows in the upper floor are cross-windows, in the ground floor they are casements with transoms, and all have hood moulds.	II
Garden wall, South Farmhouse; 52.64809°N 2.68582°W	—	Late 17th century	The wall runs along the east side of the garden. It is in red brick on a plinth of red and grey sandstone, and has coping with chamfered red sandstone. The wall is about 20 metres (66 ft) long and between 1.5 metres (4 ft 11 in) and 2 metres (6 ft 7 in) high.	II
Granary, Cantlop Farm; 52.64373°N 2.71761°W	—	Early 18th century	The granary has two storeys and seven bays. The ground floor is in red brick, the upper floor is timber framed with red brick nogging, and the hipped roof is partly in tile and partly in corrugated asbestos. There are doors in the ground floor, and two loft doors and a window in the upper floor. To the left is a two-bay cart shed.	II
Betton Strange Farmhouse; 52.67871°N 2.72667°W	—	Early to mid 18th century	The farmhouse incorporates an earlier timber framed house. It is in red brick with a tile roof, hipped to the east. There are two storeys with attics, and an L-shaped plan consisting of a range and a cross-wing. Most of the windows are casements.	II
Wall, gates and gate piers, All Saints Church; 52.65767°N 2.69565°W	—	18th century (probable)	The walls surround the churchyard, and were extended in the 19th century. They are in sandstone with some repairs in brick, and partly with sandstone coping. On the east side is a 19th-century gateway flanked by chamfered square gate piers with pyramidal caps, and a wrought iron gate and railings.	II
Lower Betton Farmhouse and stable blocks 52.67042°N 2.70608°W	—	18th century	The farmhouse and stable blocks are in red brick with some dressings in grey sandstone, dentil eaves cornices, and tile roofs with parapeted gable ends. The house has three storeys and three bays, and the stable blocks are set-back pavilions with two bays and one storey with attics; they are joined to the house by one-storey links. The house has a central doorway with a moulded architrave, a rectangular fanlight, and a hood on brackets. The pavilions have stable doors and external steps leading up to loft doors. All the windows are casements.	II
Sundial; 52.65730°N 2.69573°W	—	Mid to late 18th century	The sundial is in the churchyard of All Saints Church, and is in grey sandstone. It has a square base on a circular step, a tapered square baluster with a circular neck and pedestal, and a square top. On the top is an inscribed copper dial and a gnomon.	II
Leake memorial 52.65726°N 2.69552°W	—	Late 18th century	The memorial is in the churchyard of All Saints Church. It is in grey sandstone, and has a moulded plinth, sunken side panels, a frieze a moulded cornice, and an ogee cap, and is to the memory of Elizabeth Leake.	II
Pair of chest tombs 52.65735°N 2.69580°W	—	Late 18th century	The chest tombs are in the churchyard of All Saints Church. They are in grey sandstone, both have panels, and each has a moulded cornice to a flat top. One is to the memory of John Lockley, and the other has an illegible inscription.	II
Group of six chest tombs 52.65727°N 2.69565°W	—	Late 18th century	The chest tombs are in the churchyard of All Saints Church. They are in grey sandstone, and common features include panels with fluted pilaster strips, and moulded cornices, and there are individual differences.	II
Pair of Meire memorials 52.65736°N 2.69563°W	—	Late 18th century	The memorials are in the churchyard of All Saints Church, and are to the memory of two members of the Meire family. They are in sandstone and consist of two chest tombs. Both tombs have a chamfered plinth, panels, flanking fluted pilaster strips, a moulded cornice and a flat top. There are also individual differences.	II
Barns, stable and wall, Berrington Buildings; 52.66573°N 2.69966°W	—	Late 18th century	The buildings are in red brick with grey sandstone hinge blocks and tile roofs. The barns from an L-shaped plan, with a three-bay barn and a two-bay barn at right angles. Adjoining them is a stable, and there is a linking wall.	II
Milestone; 52.64559°N 2.71336°W	—	Late 18th century	The milestone is in grey sandstone and has a segmental top. It is inscribed with the distance in miles from "Salop" (Shrewsbury).	II
Bromley memorial 52.65734°N 2.69574°W	—	1779	The memorial is in the churchyard of All Saints Church and is to the memory of Benjamin Bromley. It is in grey sandstone and consists of a chest tomb with a chamfered base. The tomb has side panels with fluted pilaster strips, oval end panels, a moulded cornice, and a chamfered top.	II
Stables and coach house, Berrington Buildings; 52.66545°N 2.69967°W	—	c. 1780–90	The buildings are in red brick on a plinth, with grey sandstone dressings, an impost band, a dentil eaves cornice, and a hipped tile roof. There is one storey and a loft, and a front of three bays. In the centre is a blind segmental archway with pilaster strips carrying a triangular pediment with an oeil-de-boeuf window in the tympanum. Elsewhere are segmental-headed windows and doorways.	II
Cross Houses Hospital (part); 52.66384°N 2.68357°W		1792–93	Originally a workhouse, later used as a hospital, and then converted into flats, the building is in red brick with a dentil eaves cornice and a hipped slate roof. There are three storeys, a front of eleven bays, the outer two bays projecting, and rear wings, forming an H-shaped plan. In the centre is a segmental-arched doorway, and most of the windows are sashes.	II
Betton Allmere; 52.67873°N 2.73053°W	—	Late 18th or early 19th century	A farmhouse in red brick with a slate roof, it has two and three storeys and three bays. The central doorway is set in a segmental-arched recess, and has panelled pilasters, a rectangular fanlight, shaped brackets, and a segmental pediment. In front is a gabled lattice wooden porch with scalloped bargeboards and a finial. The windows are sashes.	II
Pump, South Farm; 52.64799°N 2.68607°W	—	Late 18th or early 19th century (probable)	The pump is in cast iron. It has a tall shaft with a moulded ring and a plain spout, a plain top with a straight handle, and a shallow domed cap with an urn finial.	II
Berrington Hall; 52.66328°N 2.70233°W	—	1805	Originally a rectory by designed Joseph Bromfield, later a small country house. It is in red brick on a stone plinth, with sandstone dressings, a frieze, a dentil eaves cornice, and a hipped slate roof. There are two and three storeys, five bays on the front and four on the sides. On the left is a recessed one-bay pavilion and a one-bay link, there is a recessed one-bay block on the right. Steps lead up to a sandstone porch with paired unfluted Doric columns, an architrave, a frieze, and a shallow pediment. Most of the windows are sashes.	II
Stable block, Berrington Hall; 52.66329°N 2.70278°W	—	c. 1805	The stable block is in red brick with a rendered frieze and a slate roof. It has a T-shaped plan and two storeys, and the doorways have segmental heads. There is a central projecting single-storey block with a hipped roof and sash windows. Elsewhere the windows are casements. A flight of stone steps with a wrought iron balustrade leads up to a first floor door.	II
Cantlop Bridge; 52.65177°N 2.71484°W		1813	The bridge crosses Cound Brook and was built under the supervision of Thomas Telford. Now a pedestrian bridge, it has been bypassed by a later road bridge. The bridge is in cast iron, it has abutments of red and grey sandstone, and consists of a single low segmental arch with a span of 31 feet (9.4 m). The abutments have moulded string courses, chamfered quoins, and cornices.	II*
Wigley memorial 52.65740°N 2.69534°W	—	Early 19th century	The memorial is a chest tomb in the churchyard of All Saints Church and is to the memory members of the Wigley family. It is in grey sandstone, and has side panels with fluted pilaster strips, oval end panels, a moulded cornice, and a flat top.	II
Boreton Bridge; 52.65677°N 2.71663°W	—	1826	The bridge carries a road over the Cound Brook. It is in cast iron with red brick abutments, corrugated decking, and a balustrade in concrete and steel. It has a single span with pierced spandrels and lattice girders.	II
Russell Place; 52.66389°N 2.68824°W		c. 1830–40	A terrace of five houses in red brick with a slate roof. There are two storeys with attics in the end bays, a front of eight bays, with the outer bays projecting forward and gabled. The doorways have pilasters. friezes, cornices, and fanlights, and the windows are sashes.	II
Milepost; 52.66822°N 2.69616°W	—	Early to mid 19th century	The milepost is in cast iron, it has a triangular plan and a chamfered top. It contains lettering indicating the distances in miles to "WENLOCK" (Much Wenlock), "SALOP" (Shrewsbury) and "B.NORTH (Bridgnorth).	II
Betton Strange Hall; 52.67937°N 2.72727°W	—	Mid 19th century	A rendered country house with grey sandstone dressings and hipped slate roofs. There is a central block of five bays and two storeys, flanking projecting wings of three storeys and two bays, and a rear service wing. The windows are casements, and in the central block are five eaves dormers with alternate segmental and triangular pediments. Across the front is a five-bay loggia with Tuscan columns, a moulded cornice, and a panelled parapet with globe finials. At the rear is a square bay window with a balcony.	II
St Margaret's Church; 52.68122°N 2.72688°W	—	1857–58	The church is in red sandstone with dressings in grey sandstone and a tile roof. It consists of a nave, a north porch, a lower chancel, and a tower.	II
Village pump, trough, and walls Berrington; 52.65776°N 2.69862°W	—	Mid to late 19th century	The pump is in cast iron, and has a circular shaft with moulded rings and a splayed spout, a fluted top, and a handle with an acorn balance weight. The trough is in sandstone, and they are enclosed on three sides by red brick walls with rounded coping.	II
Village pump and trough, Cantlop; 52.64802°N 2.70785°W	—	Mid to late 19th century	The pump is in cast iron, and has a circular shaft with moulded rings, a fluted top with a splayed spout, and a fluted domed cap with a finial. It has a curved handle and an inscribed iron plate. The trough is in grey sandstone with rounded front corners.	II
Village pump, Eaton Mascott; 52.64838°N 2.68587°W	—	Mid to late 19th century	The pump is in cast iron. It has a fluted columnar shaft with a splayed spout, a fluted top, a straight handle, and a fluted domed cap with a finial.	II
Pump, Newman Hall Cottages; 52.65031°N 2.69746°W	—	Mid to late 19th century	The pump is in cast iron. It has a fluted columnar shaft with a splayed spout, a fluted top, and a straight handle.	II
Pump and trough, Berrington Farmhouse; 52.65737°N 2.70000°W	—	Late 19th century	The pump is in cast iron. It has a circular shaft with a fluted spout and two angled stays, a fluted top, a fluted domed cap, and a straight handle. The trough is in grey sandstone, and has a semicircular shape.	II
War memorial 52.65741°N 2.69597°W	—	1920	The war memorial is in the churchyard of All Saints Church. It is in Grinshill sandstone, and consists of an obelisk on a tapered base on a stepped plinth. About the midpoint of the obelisk is a projecting band with pediments. On the sides are limestone plaques with inscriptions and the names of those lost in both World Wars.	II
