= Cound Halt railway station =

Former railway station in Shropshire, England

Cound Halt

General information
- Location: Cound, Shropshire; England
- Coordinates: 52.6416°N 2.6360°W
- Grid reference: SJ570050
- Platforms: 1

Other information
- Status: Disused

History
- Original company: Great Western Railway
- Post-grouping: Great Western Railway

Key dates
- 4 August 1934: Opened
- 9 September 1963: Closed
Location

Cound Halt was an unstaffed railway station on the Severn Valley line in Shropshire, England. It opened on 4 August 1934 and although thought by some people to have been closed as part of the Beeching axe in 1963 its planned closure pre-dated his report. The site of the station is now occupied by the beer garden of the adjacent Riverside Inn pub.

Preceding station	Disused railways	Following station
Berrington; Line and station closed	Great Western Railway; Severn Valley Railway	Cressage; Line and station closed
