= Cressage railway station =

Former railway station in Shropshire, England

Cressage
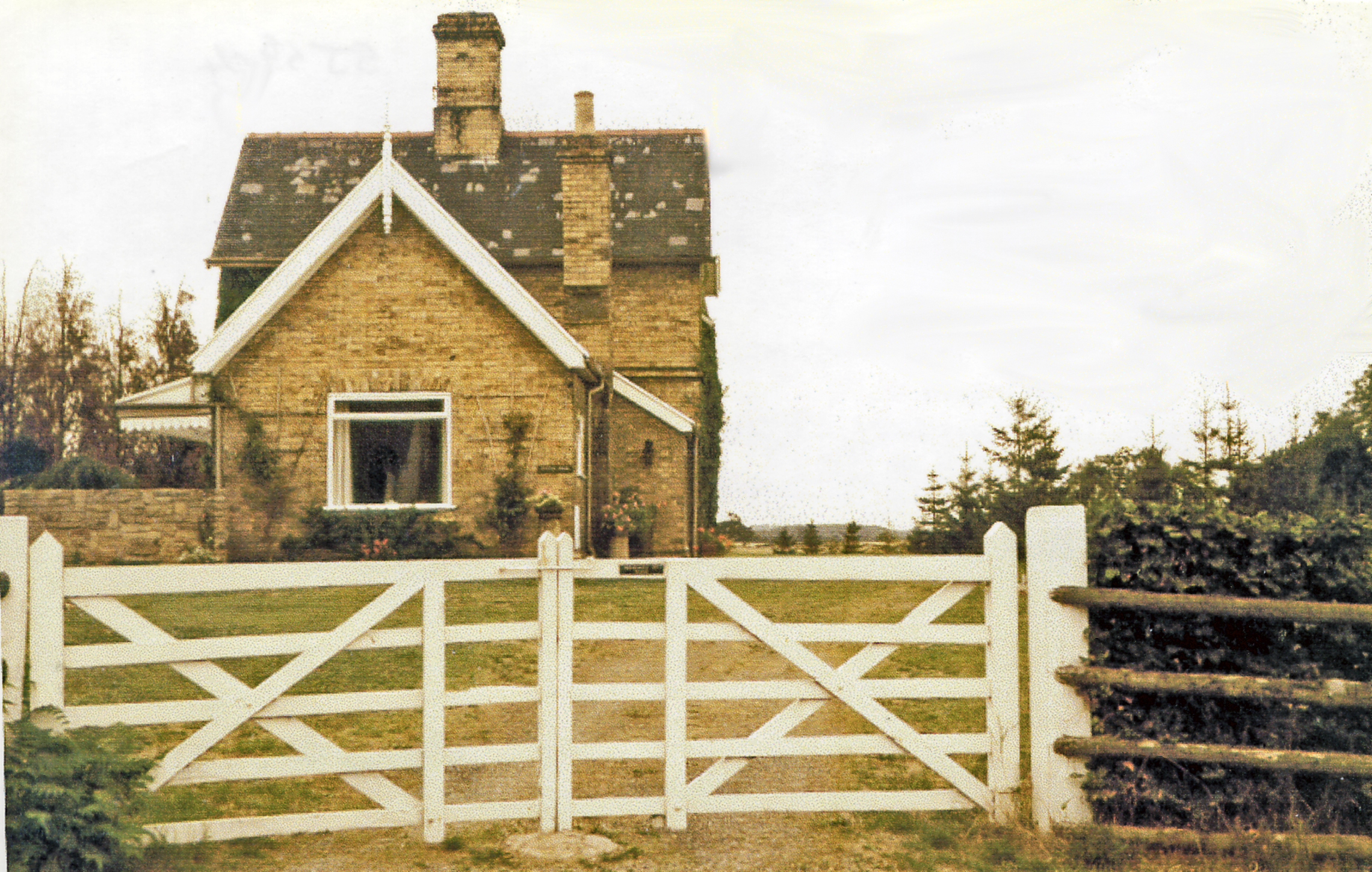
- Remains of the station in 1983

General information
- Location: Cressage, Shropshire; England
- Coordinates: 52.6357°N 2.6056°W
- Grid reference: SJ590044
- Platforms: 2

Other information
- Status: Disused

History
- Original company: West Midland Railway
- Pre-grouping: Great Western Railway
- Post-grouping: Great Western Railway

Key dates
- 1 February 1862: Opened
- 1898: Additional platform added
- 9 September 1963: Closed
Location

Cressage railway station was a stop on the Severn Valley Railway; it served the village of Cressage in Shropshire, England.

== History ==
The station opened on 1 February 1862, with a single platform and a siding. By 1898, it had acquired an additional platform along with a signal box; the sidings had been expanded.

The station was listed in the Beeching Report as a "passenger station already under consideration for closure before the formulation of the report." It closed on 9 September 1963.

== The site today ==
The station building is now a private residence and has been extended.

| Preceding station | Disused railways | Following station |
|---|---|---|
| Cound Halt; Line and station closed | Great Western Railway; Severn Valley Railway | Buildwas; Line and station closed |
