= Cantlop Bridge =

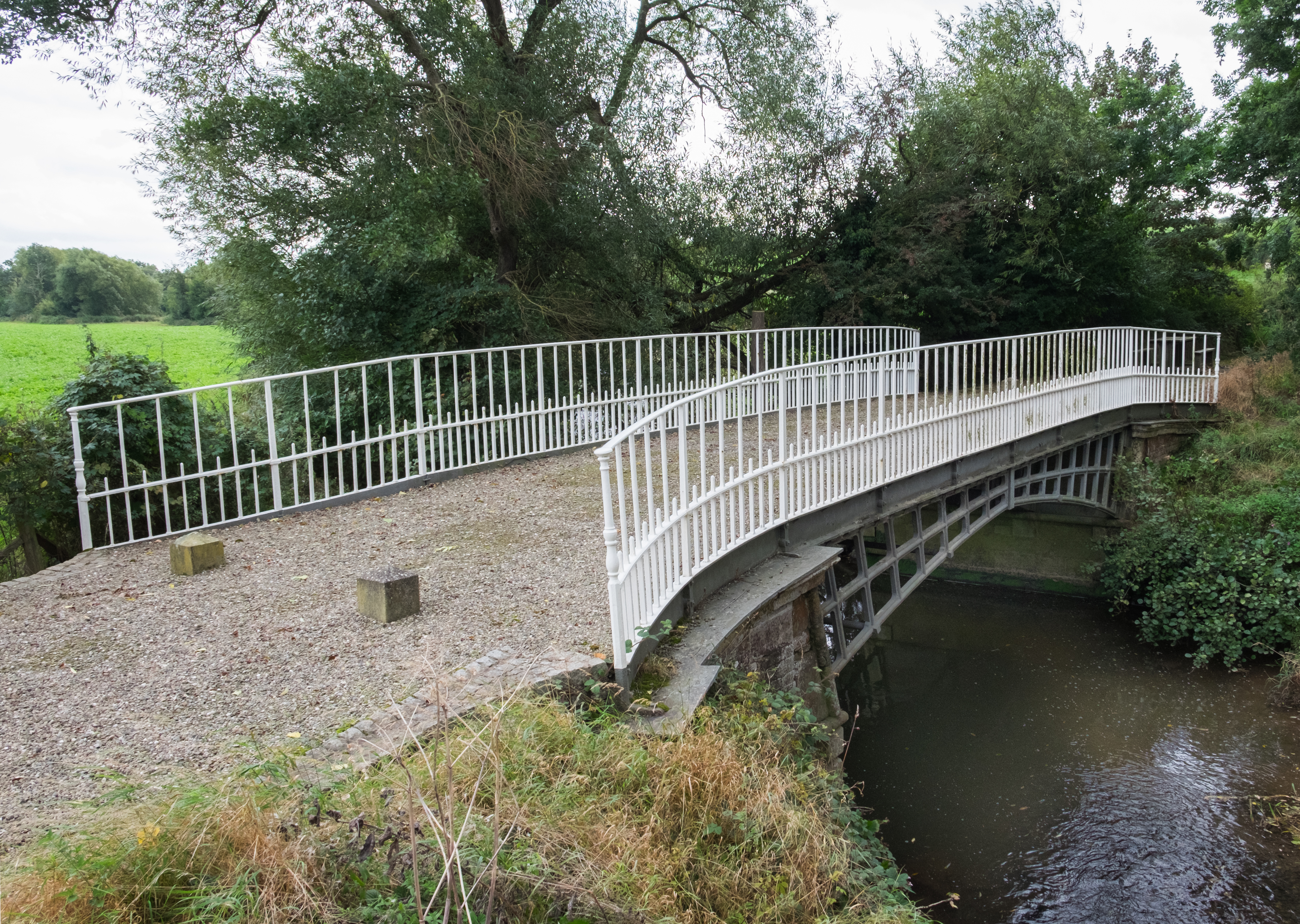
- Cantlop Bridge in 2016
- Coordinates: 52°39′06″N 2°42′53″W
- Carries: disused since the 1970s
- Crosses: Cound Brook
- Locale: Cantlop, Shropshire
- Heritage status: Grade II* listed

Characteristics
- Design: Arch bridge
- Material: Cast-iron
- Total length: 9.5 metres (31 ft)
- No. of spans: 1

History
- Designer: Thomas Telford
- Construction end: 1818

Location
- Interactive map of Cantlop Bridge

Cantlop Bridge is a single span cast-iron road bridge over the Cound Brook, located to the north of Cantlop in the parish of Berrington, Shropshire. It was constructed in 1818 to a design possibly by Thomas Telford, having at least been approved by him, and replaced an unsuccessful cast iron coach bridge constructed in 1812. The design of the bridge was innovative for the period, using a light-weight design of cast-iron lattice ribs to support the road deck in a single span, and appears to be a scaled-down version of a Thomas Telford bridge at Meole Brace, Shropshire. The bridge is the only surviving Telford-approved cast-iron bridge in Shropshire, and is a Grade II* listed building and scheduled monument. It originally carried the turnpike road from Shrewsbury to Acton Burnell.

== History and description ==
Thomas Telford worked as the county surveyor of Shropshire between 1787 and 1834, and the bridge is reported to have once held a cast iron plate above the centre of the arch inscribed with "Thomas Telford Esqr - Engineer - 1818", which is apparently visible in historic photographs, but has not been in place since at least 1985. The bridge design incorporates dressed red and grey sandstone abutments with ashlar dressings, these are slightly curved and ramped, with chamfered ashlar quoins, string courses, and moulded cornices. The structural cast-iron consists of a single segmental span with four arched lattice ribs, braced by five transverse cast-ironmembers. The road deck is formed from cast-iron metal deck plates, tarmacked over, and now finished with gravel. The original parapets have at some point been replaced with painted cast-iron railings with dograils, dogbars and shaped end balusters.

=== Present-day ===
The bridge today remains as a monument only, being closed to vehicular traffic. It was bypassed by a more modern adjacent concrete bridge built in the 1970s. It is in the care of English Heritage and is freely accessible to pedestrians. A layby exists for visitors to park and there is an information board.

== See also ==
- Grade II* listed buildings in Shropshire Council (A–G)
- Listed buildings in Berrington, Shropshire
