= All Saints Church, Berrington =

Coordinates: 52.6574°N 2.6956°W

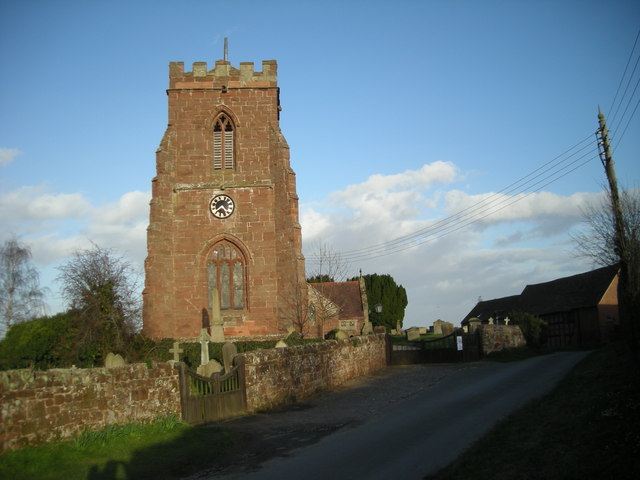
- Tower of All Saints Church, Berrington

- Location in Shropshire
- OS grid reference: SJ 530 069
- Location: Berrington, Shropshire
- Country: England
- Denomination: Anglican
- Website: Wenlock Team of Parishes

History
- Status: Parish church

Architecture
- Functional status: Active
- Heritage designation: Grade I
- Designated: 13 June 1958
- Architect(s): E. Haycock, junior (Restoration)
- Architectural type: Church
- Style: Gothic

Specifications
- Materials: Sandstone, tiled roofs

Administration
- Province: Canterbury
- Diocese: Hereford
- Archdeaconry: Ludlow
- Deanery: Condover
- Parish: Berrington with Betton Strange

Clergy
- Rector: Revd Preb Stephen Lowe
- Vicar: Revd Judy Davies

All Saints Church is in the village of Berrington, Shropshire, England. It is an active Anglican parish church in the deanery of Condover, the archdeaconry of Ludlow, and the diocese of Hereford. Its benefice is united with those of twelve other parishes to form the Wenlock Team of Parishes. The church is recorded in the National Heritage List for England as a designated Grade I listed building.

== History ==
The presence of a church in Berrington is recorded in the Domesday Book. The present church dates from the 13th century, with additions and alterations during the following two centuries. In 1858 Richard Dodson inserted a timber screen in place of a chancel arch. The church was restored in 1877 by E. Haycock, junior, when the south porch was also rebuilt.

== Architecture ==
=== Exterior ===
All Saints is constructed in red sandstone, with tiled roofs. Its plan consists of a four-bay nave, a south aisle, a south porch, a two-bay chancel, and a west tower. The tower is in Perpendicular style. It has two stages, with diagonal buttresses, a battlemented parapet and a pyramidal roof. There is a three-light west window, and the bell openings contain Y-tracery. In the north wall of the nave is a single lancet window. The south porch contains the re-used former 13th-century doorway of the nave. The chancel dates from the 14th century, and its east window has three lights.

=== Interior ===
Inside the church is a three-bay arcade between the nave and the south aisle. In the south aisle is a trefoil-headed piscina. The font is Norman, and is set on the base of a Roman column. It is round and carved with the depiction of a beast. The pulpit dates from 1861 to 1862. The stained glass in the east window dates from before 1820, and is by Betton and Evans. On the north side of the chancel is a window of 1877 by Hardman. The monuments include the wooden effigy of a knight, dating possibly from the early 14th century, locally known as 'Old Scriven'; the knight was said to have fought a lion and received the damage to the face thereby. There is a later monument from the early 19th century by John Bacon, junior. The two-manual pipe organ was made in 1913 by Blackett and Howden. There is a ring of eight bells. Six of these were cast in 1796 by Thomas Mears I, and the other two in 1951 by Mears and Stainbank, all at the Whitechapel Bell Foundry. A plaque records that in 1928 the existing bells were restored and rehung in memory of Gilbert Culceth Holcroft who was killed in World War I.

== External features ==
Associated with the church are seven structures that have been listed at Grade II. To the south of the church is a sundial dating from the 18th century. Also to the south of the church is the chest tomb of Benjamin Bromley, dated 1779, two chest tombs of members of the Meire family, dating from the late 18th century, and a group of six more chest tombs dating from the late 18th and the early 19th centuries. To the southeast of the church is the chest tomb of members of the Wigley family, dating from the early 19th century. The other structures are a pair of chest tombs, and the Leake Memorial, both of which date from the 18th century.

The parish war memorial to local dead of both World Wars, in the form of an obelisk sculpted by Landucci and Sons, stands in the older churchyard; among the names listed being Pilot Officer Montague Hulton-Harrop, victim of the World War II friendly fire incident known as the "Battle of Barking Creek". The churchyard's extension contains the war graves of two soldiers of World War I.

== See also ==
- Grade I listed churches in Shropshire
- Listed buildings in Berrington, Shropshire
