= Cound Hall =

Grade I listed building in Shropshire, England

Coordinates: 52°38′38″N 2°39′3″W

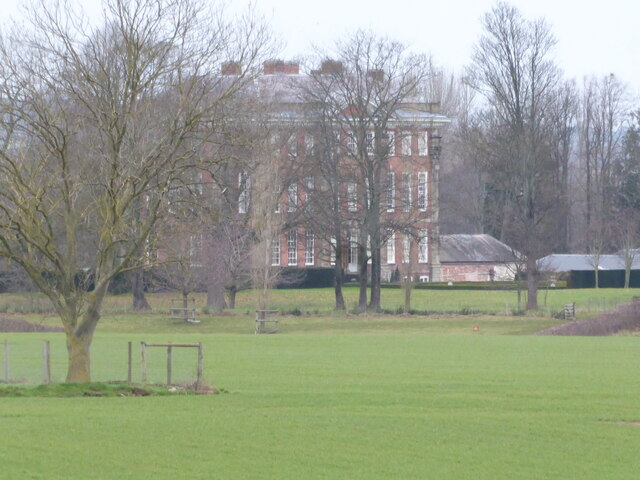
Cound Hall

Cound Hall, in Cound, Shropshire, England, is a Grade I listed building. It is a large vernacular Baroque house, with a basement and two storeys of tall slender windows topped by a half-storey, built of red brick with stone dressings. The house was built in 1703–04 for Edward Cressett by John Prince of Shrewsbury.

== Architectural ==
Cound Hall is a prime example of the rendering of the English Baroque manner in a deeply countrified setting in the Welsh Marches, showing some reflection of the work of Francis Smith of Warwick. The west and east facades are very similar but not quite identical. The house is made notable for its giant order of stop-fluted Corinthian pilasters with richly carved capitals, which Howard Colvin found "ambitious but inept" and suggested that the inspiration was the King William block at Greenwich Hospital, designed by Christopher Wren. The East front also has a pediment, which breaks back in its centre; it is decorated with abaci and fragments of entablature above pilasters that stand on rusticated bases.

The pièce de résistance of the house is arguably the staircase, a nice alteration which can be dated to the late 18th century. The concept of the staircase was to gain more room where the original staircase had been whilst giving more perceived spaciousness. The staircase has a delicate metal handrail and runs through both storeys along three sides of an open well. The clever structure of the staircase is that it is not attached along the back wall of the hall but leaves a space there and flies upward independently of the back wall. The staircase rests on two beautiful fluted columns. There is light Neo-Elizabethan plaster work on the underside of the staircase.

== History after the Cressetts ==
Ownership of Cound Hall passed from the Cressett family to the Thursby-Pelham family by marriage and inheritance; then to the McCorquodale family - into which the young Barbara Cartland married; she lived at the Hall for some years in the late 1920s/early 1930s whilst married to Alexander McCorquodale, her first husband.

In the 1960s, the then owner (Morris) divided the house into rented flats, and it was tenanted in this way until 1981, as gradually the building deteriorated and the tenants left. The hall then stood empty and derelict for 15 years, until the current owners (the Waller family) bought the house as a virtual wreck in 1996 with the intention of restoring it.

In 2004 it featured in the BBC TV programme, "Restoration" but was unsuccessful in the public competition for funds to renovate the building. English Heritage was most concerned about the building's continuing deterioration at that time, and placed the Hall on its At risk register. However, through building a new estate of houses, inside the gatehouse entrance on the east side of the estate, they raised sufficient funds to rescue the house. The Hall was now almost fully restored by 2008 and is inhabited as a family house once again.

In January 2015, a painting of a tabby cat, once owned by Anthony Ashley Cooper, 1st Earl of Shaftesbury (circa 1673), was stolen from the home's grounds. In November of the same year, it was found in a flat in Paisley, Scotland.

== See also ==
- Grade I listed buildings in Shropshire
- Listed buildings in Cound
