= Laurence Arthur Turner =

English artisan and master craftsman (1864–1957)

Laurence Arthur Turner FSA (9 July 1864 – 4 October 1957) was an English artisan and master craftsman.

== Career ==
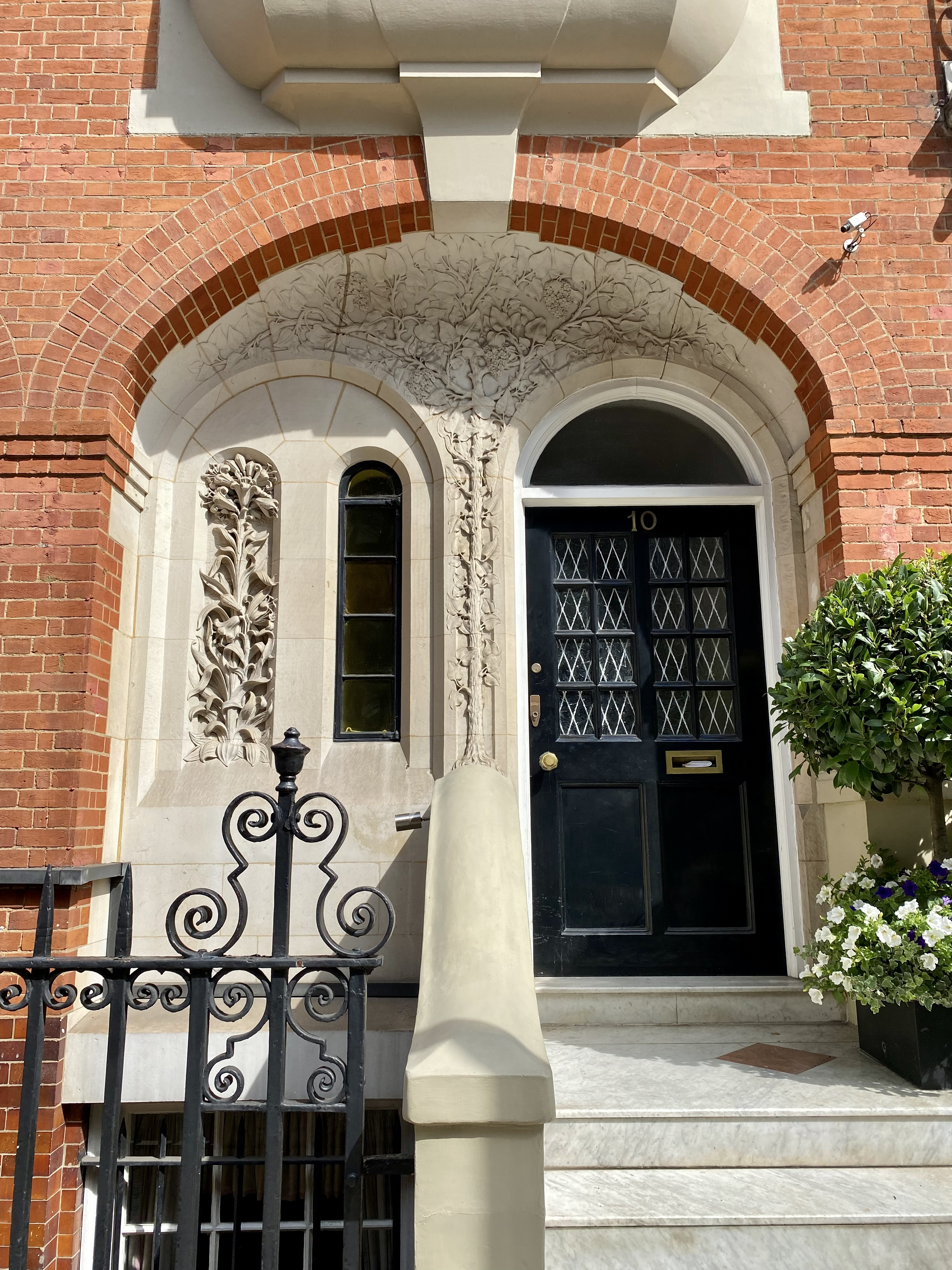
The carvings at the entrance to 10 Green Street in Mayfair, believed to have been done by Turner in 1895.

The brother of the architect Thackery Turner, was a leading figure in woodcarving and ornate stonemasonry, and undertook many prestigious commissions. He executed ceilings in Hampton Court Palace.

He was employed by Walter Cunliffe to decorate his new home, built in 1898, Headley Court. Here he upholstered the drawing room with limed chestnut Elizabethan jewel panelling and a chimneypiece from Hinchingbrooke Hall with very fine Jacobean style plaster ceiling. The former smoking room, now the Mess Bar, is panelled and has a carved chimneypiece with arcading on caryatides. The elaborate ceiling in this room he embellished and depicts Tudor roses, fleur-de-lis and rabbits, the latter in recognition of the family name. It was originally white.

His other commissions also include tombs for William Morris and Norman Shaw as well as decorative work for commercial and government buildings, churches, and educational establishments. He worked on a number of war memorials including the Robertson War Memorials in Netley Park, Guildford and Michel Dene, Wealden as well as Cound War Memorial, Shropshire, and Woolmer Green War Memorial, Hertfordshire, all of which are Grade II-listed.

Turner was elected as Master of the Art Workers' Guild in 1922, and was also a Fellow of the British Institute of Industrial Art.

== List of works ==
- Blo' Norton War Memorial, Norfolk, 1920 (grade II listed)
- Bloxham War Memorial, Oxfordshire, 1920 (grade II listed)
- Cound War Memorial, Shropshire, 1920 (grade II listed)
- Epping War Memorial, Essex, 1921 (grade II listed)
- Robertson War Memorial Bequest Obelisk at Michel Dene, West Sussex, 1940 (grade II listed)
- Stone carvings at 10 Green Street, Mayfair.
