= Cressage =

Village and civil parish in Shropshire, England

Coordinates: 52.633°N 2.605°W

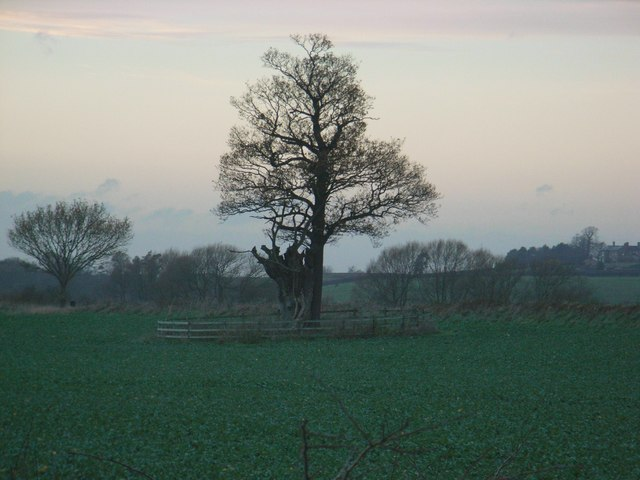
- The Lady Oak at Cressage

- Location within Shropshire
- Population: 707 (2011)
- OS grid reference: SJ590041
- Civil parish: Cressage
- Unitary authority: Shropshire
- Ceremonial county: Shropshire
- Region: West Midlands
- Country: England
- Sovereign state: United Kingdom
- Post town: SHREWSBURY
- Postcode district: SY5
- Dialling code: 01952
- Police: West Mercia
- Fire: Shropshire
- Ambulance: West Midlands
- UK Parliament: Shrewsbury and Atcham

Cressage is a village and civil parish in Shropshire, England. It is located 4 miles (6.4 km) north-west of the nearest town Much Wenlock and 8 miles (12.9 km) south-east of Shrewsbury. It lies the junction of the A458 and B4380 roads; the River Severn flows around its northern boundary. The parish council is combined with the neighbouring parish of Sheinton. The village's population at the 2021 United Kingdom census was 730.

== History ==
The village is mentioned in the Domesday Book under the name Christesache. The meaning is "Christ's Oak", and this over time has been corrupted to form the word "Cressage". The oak tree was part of a forest (which no longer exists), and a cutting from it was planted near the village in 1616. This was later relocated due to railway construction.

In 584, Saint Augustine reputedly preached under the Cressage Oak.

On 30 June 2012, the Olympic torch passed through the village on its way to London.

== Transport ==
The Severn Valley Railway once ran through the village, calling at Cressage railway station, before the section between Shrewsbury and Bridgnorth was dismantled.

Select Bus Services operates the 436 bus route, providing an hourly service in each direction to Shrewsbury, Much Wenlock and Bridgnorth.

The village lies on the intersection of the A458 and the B4380, near to the River Severn.

== Landmarks ==
Cressage Bridge lies several hundred metres north of the village and carries the B4380 road over the River Severn. Designed by L.G. Mouchel and built in 1913, it has a hollow construction of reinforced concrete and a span of 170 feet (52 metres).

There are two hexagonal brick pill boxes, one on each side of the river, constructed during the Second World War to defend the bridge in the event of enemy invasion.

The parish's war memorial, in the form of a granite wheel or Celtic cross, stands at the village's main road junction on the A458.

== Amenities ==
Cressage had a public house, The Eagles, which was shut down early 2008, but reopened December 2009. It shut again in early 2015 and was sold on at auction.

The ancient church in Cressage was a chapelry of Cound and was dedicated to St Sampson. Its position close to the river made it liable to flooding and so, in 1841, it was replaced by the present building sited somewhat further from the water. The exact site of the original church is marked by a pillar. Anglican church, Christ Church is on Harley Road. It holds infrequent services, is normally locked and is currently in the process of closure. However, burials continue in the graveyard.

There is a primary school, village hall, village shop, social club and a medical practice.

== Notable people ==
Among the village's well-known inhabitants was Admiral Sir Herbert Annesley Packer, who was born in the village on 9 October 1894.

== See also ==
- Listed buildings in Cressage
