= Cantlop =

Village in Shropshire, England

Coordinates: 52.645°N 2.713°W

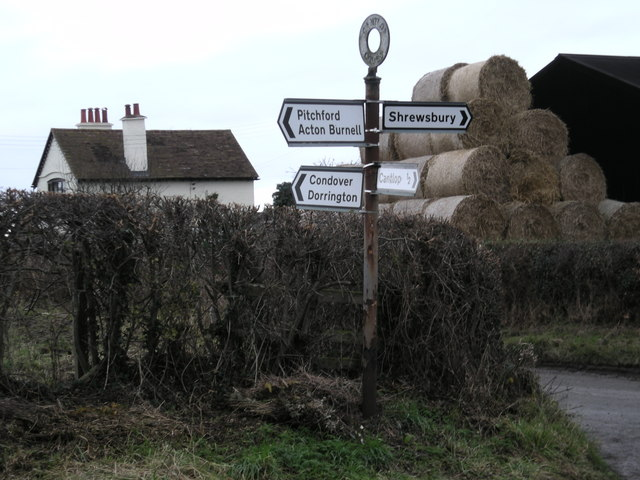
- Signpost at Cantlop Cross, the crossroads. The centre of Shropshire is in this vicinity.

- Location within Shropshire
- OS grid reference: SJ517055
- Civil parish: Berrington
- Unitary authority: Shropshire
- Ceremonial county: Shropshire
- Region: West Midlands
- Country: England
- Sovereign state: United Kingdom
- Post town: SHREWSBURY
- Postcode district: SY5
- Dialling code: 01743
- Police: West Mercia
- Fire: Shropshire
- Ambulance: West Midlands
- UK Parliament: Shrewsbury and Atcham

Cantlop is a small village in the English county of Shropshire. It is part of the civil parish of Berrington.

Nearby villages include Condover, to the west of Cantlop, and the village of Berrington to the north-west, on the other side of the Cound Brook which flows to the north of Cantlop, and Pitchford to the south. The area is largely agricultural. The elevation at Cantlop Cross is 96 metres (315 ft) above sea level.

== Etymology ==
Various meanings have been suggested for the name, such as an enclosed or cut-off valley or an enclosure in a waste or common. Ekwall proposes a twofold origin: 'Cant' for being located on the Cound Brook, where Cound could be a name, and '-lop' from Old English 'hop', or valley. But being first recorded in the Domesday Book as Cantelop, and in an area highly coveted by Norman knights, it is very possible that the name comes from the Old French chante lou, lit. sing wolf (wolf song), for a place where wolves could be heard howling. This would be supported by the frequent occurrence the toponym in France today as well as its various alternative spellings, Chanteloup, Canteloup, Chantelouve, Canteleu and Canteleux.

== History ==
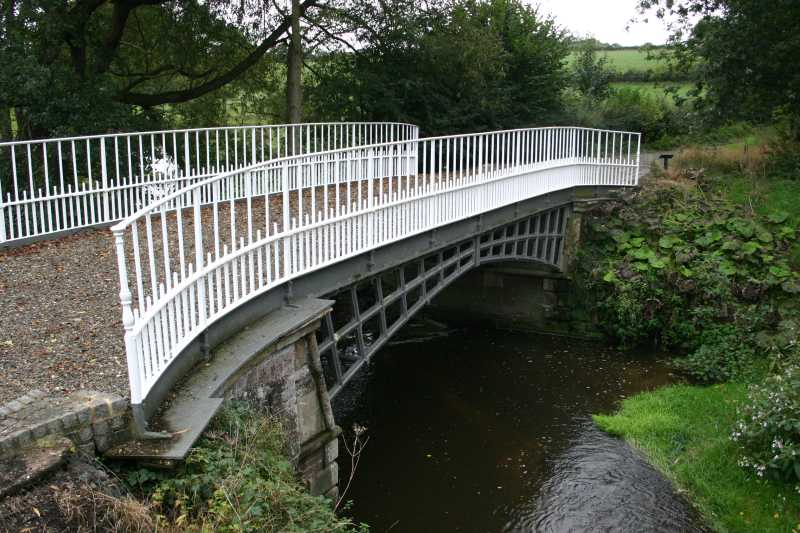
Cantlop Bridge

To the north of the village there is a cast-iron single-span bridge — the Cantlop Bridge — now generally accepted to have been designed by Thomas Telford, who was the County Surveyor of Shropshire. The bridge crosses the Cound Brook and was built in 1818. Today it no longer takes road traffic, as a modern bridge exists adjacent to it, but is open to pedestrians.

The bridge carried the 1797 turnpike road from Shrewsbury to Acton Burnell, which continued through Cantlop itself. A late 18th-century milestone exists just to the north of Cantlop Cross (the crossroad junction at Cantlop) which marks 5.0 miles (8.0 km) from (the centre of) Shrewsbury (written on the milestone as "Salop"); it is now Grade II listed.

== Centre of Shropshire ==
On 1 August 2014, on BBC Radio Shropshire, it was confirmed by Andy Stegall from Ordnance Survey that Cantlop is the geographic centre of the ceremonial county of Shropshire. This is also shown on the Ordnance Survey's mapping of the ceremonial counties, where the name of Shropshire is centred immediately to the southwest of Cantlop Cross.
