= Berrington, Shropshire =

Village in Shropshire, England

Coordinates: 52.657778°N 2.698611°W

Berrington
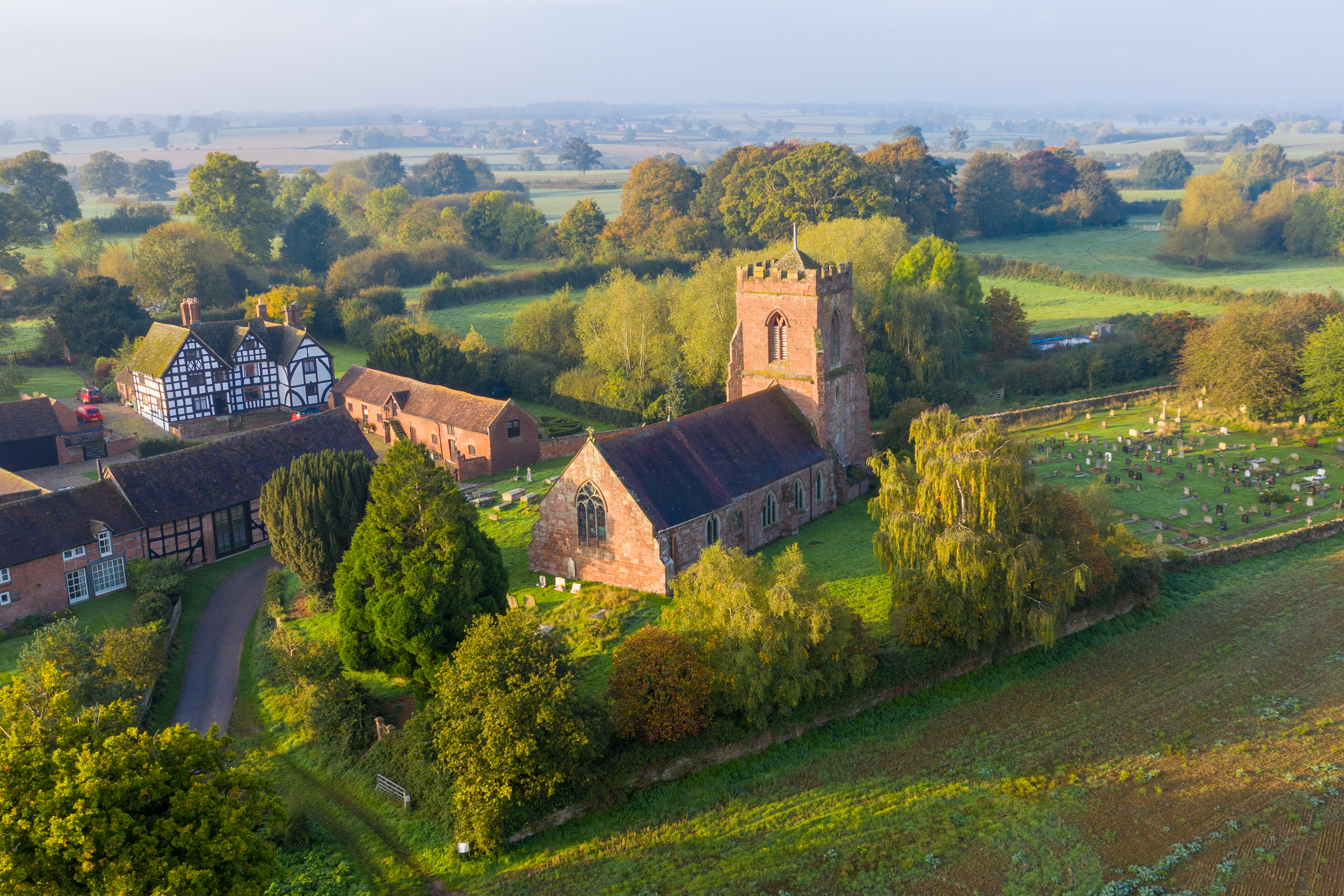
- Berrington Parish Church

- Location within Shropshire
- Population: 30 (2001 Census)
- OS grid reference: SJ5275006940
- Civil parish: Berrington
- Unitary authority: Shropshire
- Ceremonial county: Shropshire
- Region: West Midlands
- Country: England
- Sovereign state: United Kingdom
- Post town: SHREWSBURY
- Postcode district: SY5
- Dialling code: 01743
- Police: West Mercia
- Fire: Shropshire
- Ambulance: West Midlands
- UK Parliament: Shrewsbury and Atcham
- Website: Shropshire Council

Berrington is a small village and civil parish in Shropshire, England. According to the 2001 census the village had a population of 30, though the parish, which also includes the larger village of Cross Houses and other settlements such as Betton Strange and Cantlop, had a population of 805 in total.

The village is about five miles SE of Shrewsbury. The local newsletter, The Village Pump, is distributed bi-monthly. There is a phone box and a village hall.

A notable feature in the parish, but not the village itself, is Cantlop Bridge. The village primary school closed in 1994 and has since been converted into a private residence.

A damaged wooden effigy in the parish church (All Saints) is known locally as 'Old Scriven'. It is said that he once fought a lion, hence his damaged face.

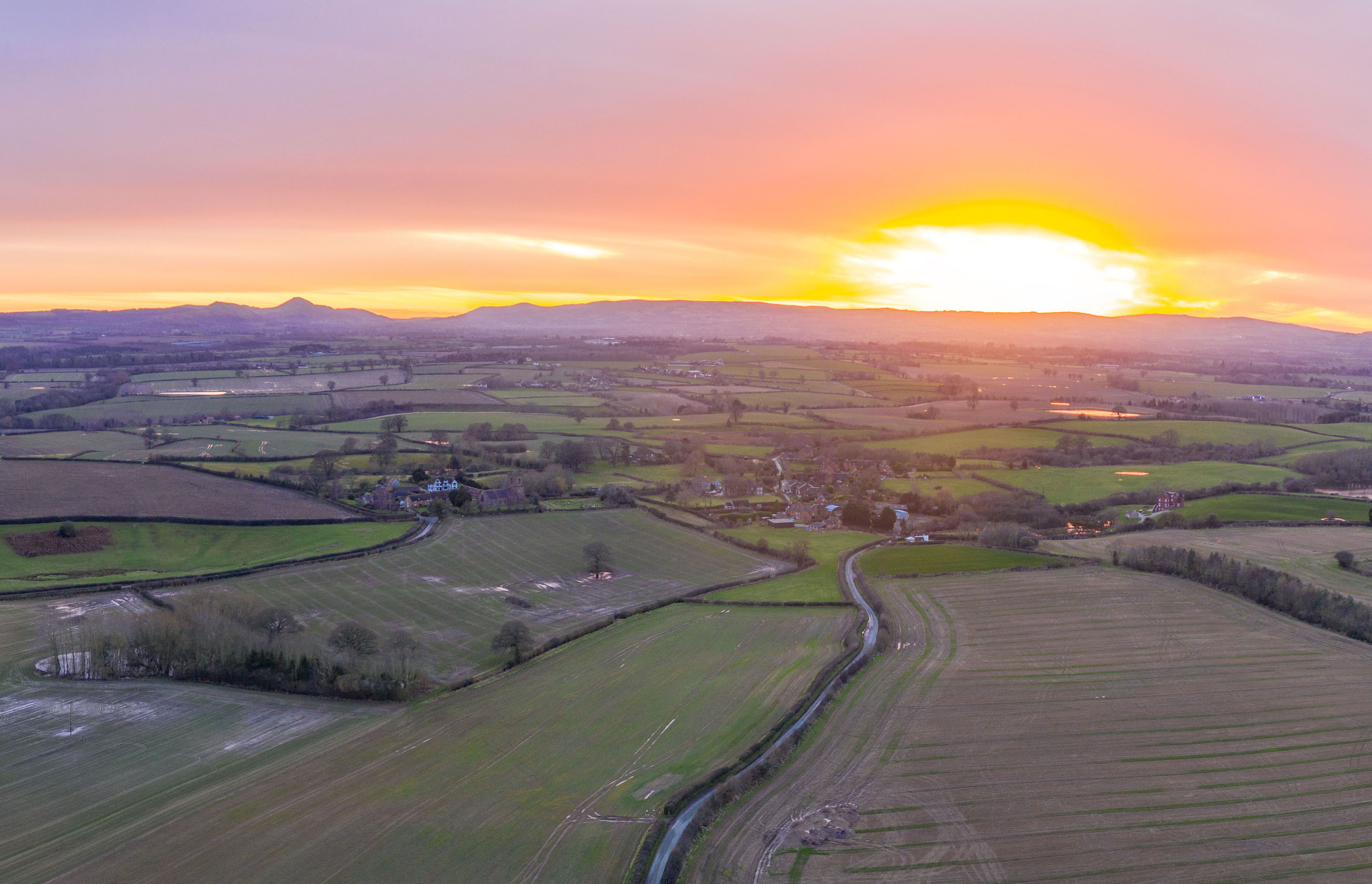
Sunset over Berrington in Shropshire.

Berrington Manor is a Grade II* listed 17th century timber-framed house, located opposite All Saints church.

== See also ==
- Listed buildings in Berrington, Shropshire
