= Stratton =

Stratton may refer to:

== People ==
- Stratton (surname)

== Places ==
=== Australia ===
- Stratton, Western Australia

=== Canada ===
- Stratton, Ontario

=== England ===
- Stratton, Cornwall
- Stratton, Dorset
- Stratton, Gloucestershire
- Stratton-on-the-Fosse, Somerset
- Stratton Hall, Suffolk
- Stratton St Margaret, Wiltshire

=== United States ===
- Stratton, California, original name of Cuyamaca, California; also the former name of Stratford, California
- Stratton, Colorado
- Stratton, Maine
- Stratton (Centreville, Maryland)
- Stratton, Nebraska
- Stratton, Ohio
- Stratton, Vermont, New England town
  - Stratton Mountain (Vermont), mountain in the town
  - Stratton Mountain Resort, ski area on the mountain
  - Stratton Mountain, Vermont, resort community at base of ski area
- Stratton, Virginia
- Stratton Lake, a lake in Minnesota

== Other uses ==
- Stratton (film), a 2017 British film
- Stratton (crater), a lunar crater
- Stratton (company), an English manufacturer of powder compacts and other cosmetics-related metal items.
- Stratton (financial services), an Australian finance brokerage
- USCGC Stratton (WMSL-752), a US Coast Guard cutter named for Dorothy C. Stratton
- Danny Stratton, lead character in S.M.A.R.T. Chase, a 2017 British-Chinese film (unrelated to the film Stratton)

== See also ==
- Stratton Upper School, an upper school in Biggleswade, Bedfordshire, England
- Stretton (disambiguation)
- Justice Stratton (disambiguation)
- Straton (disambiguation)
- Stratten, a surname
