= Stratton (surname) =

Stratton is a surname. Notable people with the surname include:

- Addams Stratton McAllister (1875–1946), American electrical engineer and editor
- Allan Stratton (born 1951), Canadian author
- Allegra Stratton (born 1980), British journalist and writer
- Anne Stratton (1887–1977), American composer
- Arthur Stratton (1911–1975), American author, traveller and OSS agent
- Ben Stratton (born 1989), Australian footballer
- Brian Stratton (born 1957), American politician from New York
- Casey Stratton (born 1976), American musician
- Charles C. Stratton (1796–1859), American politician
- Charles Sherwood Stratton (1838–1883), American circus performer as General Tom Thumb
- Chris Stratton (born 1990), American baseball player
- David Stratton (disambiguation), multiple people
- Dennis Stratton (born 1952), British guitarist
- Dorothy C. Stratton (1899–2006), director of US Coast Guard women's reserve
- Ellen Stratton (1939–2016), American model
- Evelyn Lundberg Stratton (born 1953), American judge from Ohio
- Felton Stratton (1895–1974), American baseball player
- F. J. M. Stratton (1881–1960), British astrophysicist
- Fred Stratton (1913–2001), British physician and medical researcher
- Gene Stratton Porter (1863–1924), American author, screenwriter and naturalist
- George M. Stratton (1865–1957), American psychologist
- Gil Stratton (1922–2008), American actor and sportscaster
- Grace Stratton (born 1999), New Zealand blogger and fashion entrepreneur
- Hal Stratton (born 1950), chairman of the US Consumer Product Safety Commission, 2002
- Harold M. Stratton (1879–1962), founder of Briggs & Stratton
- Helen Stratton (1867–1961), English artist and illustrator
- James Robert Stratton (1857–1916), Irish-Canadian politician
- John Stratton (disambiguation), multiple people
- Joseph Stratton (1839–1917), English clergyman, humanitarian, writer, and activist
- Juliana Stratton (born 1965), American politician
- Julius Adams Stratton (1901–1994), American educator and President of MIT
- Kim Stratton (born 1961), American gospel musician
- Lois Stratton (1927–2020), American politician
- Margaret Stratton (born 1953), American photographer and video artist
- Mary Chase Perry Stratton (1867–1961), American ceramic artist
- Michael Stratton (born 1957), British clinical scientist
- Mike Stratton (1941–2020), American football player
- Monty Stratton (1912–1982), American baseball player
- Richard Stratton (CCC) (born 1958), American educator
- Richard A. Stratton (1931–2025), American naval aviator
- Rick Stratton, make-up artist
- Samuel S. Stratton (1916–1990), American politician
- Samuel Somerville Stratton (1898–1969), American academic administrator
- Samuel Wesley Stratton (1861–1931), American educator and President of MIT
- Solomon Stratton (1785–1818), American explorer
- Terry Stratton (born 1938), Canadian politician
- William Stratton (disambiguation), multiple people
  - William Stratton (1914–2001), American politician
  - W. K. Stratton (writer), American writer
  - W. K. Stratton (actor) (born 1950), American actor
- W. S. Stratton (1848–1902), American gold prospector and philanthropist
- John Berkeley, 1st Baron Berkeley of Stratton (1602–1678)

== See also ==
- Straton (disambiguation)
- Strutton
- Stratten
