= W. K. Stratton =

W. K. Stratton may refer to:

- W. K. Stratton (writer), American writer
- W. K. Stratton (actor) (born 1950), American actor
