= Kathleen Frances Barker =

English children's book illustrator and writer

- Born: 2 January 1901; Ollerton, Nottinghamshire, England
- Died: 1 April 1963 (aged 62); Harrogate, West Yorkshire, England
- Resting place: Stonefall Cemetery, Harrogate
- Other name: K. F. Barker
- Known for: Book illustration; children's literature; animal art
- Father: Wright Barker

Signature
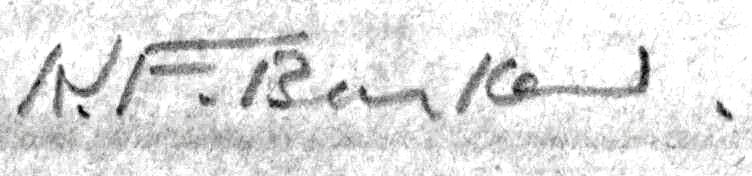

Kathleen Frances Wright Barker (2 January 1901 – 1 April 1963), known professionally as K. F. Barker, was an English illustrator and writer of children's books, based in Harrogate, West Yorkshire, England.

Barker's illustrations appeared in at least thirty books, most of which were written by herself. She specialised in ink and pencil drawings, mainly of pet dogs of mixed breed, but also of horses and other animals. For a 1936 reprint of Anna Sewell's Black Beauty, Barker provided the illustrations. Besides functioning as book illustrations, her drawings were also sold as prints. In the 1950s, small versions of her dog drawings were reproduced on Stratton powder compacts.

During Barker's lifetime her first book, Just Dogs, was her most popular work, and it attracted the critics' attention when first published. When some book-reviewers mistook her nom de plume to be that of a man, her publisher repeated the error on the dust jacket of her book without contradiction. However, by 1937 The Yorkshire Post had discovered that she was "Miss Barker".

== Background ==
Barker's grandfather, Benjamin Barker, (Note: Benjamin Barker (Clayton 6 August 1831 – Horton, Bradford April 1896). GRO index: Deaths Jun 1896 Barker Benjamin 64 Bradford, Y 9b 83.) was a weaving overlooker or supervisor. He was illiterate at the time of his first marriage, although his wife was not. Barker's grandmother was Lydia Barker née Robinson, (Note: Lydia Barker née Robinson (Great Horton 1834 – West Yorkshire March 1885). GRO index: Marriages Dec 1852 Robinson Lydia and Barker Benjamin. Bradford 9b 49. Deaths Mar 1885 Barker Lydia 51 Bradford, Y. 9b 103.) the daughter of Jonas Robinson, a shoemaker. Lydia Robinson was a worsted weaver. Barker's father was the artist Wright Barker, (Note: John Wright Barker (Great Horton, Bradford 16 July 1863 – Harrogate 10 March 1941). GRO index: Births Sep 1863 Barker Wright Bradford Yk 9b 125. Deaths Mar 1941 Barker Wright 77 Knaresbro' 9a 414.) who was born in Great Horton, Bradford. Wright Barker left Bradford and worked as an artist in Edwinstowe and Mansfield, Nottinghamshire, then moved to Hampstead. Barker's mother was Ellen Mary Alcock, (Note: Ellen Mary Barker née Alcock (East Retford 13 April 1868 – Harrogate 20 January 1947). GRO index: Births Jun 1868 Alcock Ellen Mary East Retford 7b 19. Marriages Sep 1892 Barker Wright and Alcock Ellen Mary. Southwell 7b 571. Deaths Mar 1947 Barker Ellen M. 78 Claro 2c 130.) the daughter of a Tuxford farmer. In 1914 the family moved to Thorn Lea, 16 Duchy Road, Harrogate, which was to be Barker's home for the rest of her life.

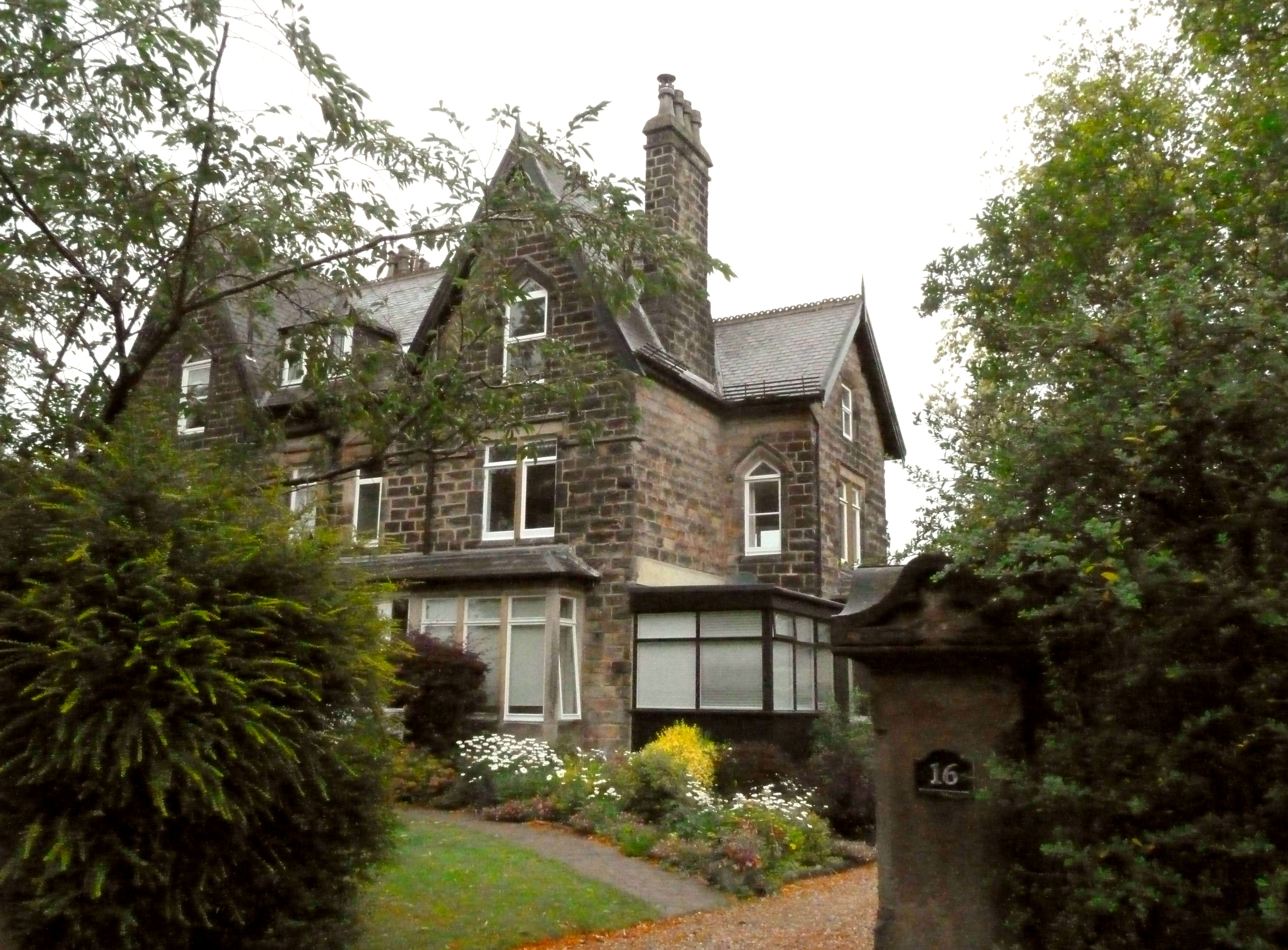
Barker's Harrogate home and studio

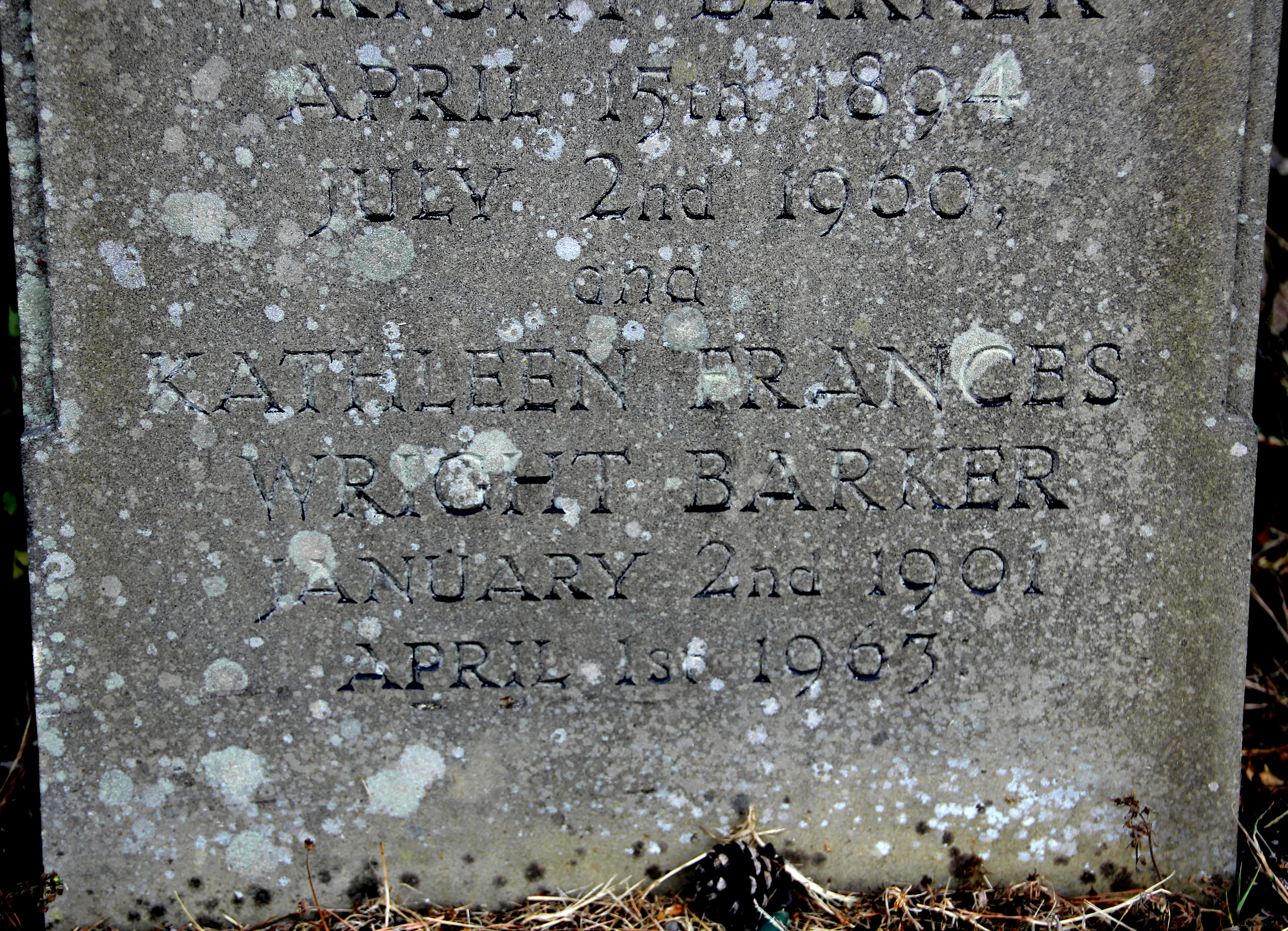
Inscription on Barker's gravestone

Barker was born at The Beeches, Willow Road, Ollerton, Nottinghamshire, (Note: Kathleen Frances Wright Barker (Ollerton 2 June 1901 – Harrogate 1 April 1963). GRO index: Births Mar 1901 Barker Kathleen Frances W. Southwell 7b 458. Deaths Jun 1963 Barker Kathleen F.W. 62 Claro 2C 74. Barker was buried in Stonefall Cemetery, Harrogate, with her sister Gladys, in section 20E, grave 7170.) and was the third child of the four offspring of Wright Barker and his wife Ellen Mary. She was baptised at St Giles' Church, Ollerton on 14 April 1901. Her siblings were: Gladys Wright Barker, (Note: Gladys Wright Barker (Ollerton 15 April 1894 – 2 July 1960). GRO index: Births Jun 1894 Barker Gladys Wright Southwell 7b 423. Deaths Sep 1960 Barker Gladys W. 66 Claro 2c 70.) Doris Wright Barker, PhD, (Note: Doris Wright Barker (Ollerton 12 December 1898 – Selby 1987). GRO index: Births Mar 1898 Barker Doris Wright Southwell 7b 453. Marriages Jun 1928 Barker Doris W. and Murphy William. Knaresbro' 9a 235 Deaths 1987 Murphy Doris Wright 12 December 1898 Selby 2 2709.) who was a teacher and writer, and palaeontologist Reginald Wright Barker. (Note: Reginald Wright Barker (Ollerton 8 December 1907 – 1969).Births Dec 1907 Barker Reginald Wright Southwell 7b 490. Deaths Sep 1969 Barker Reginald 8De1907 Todmorden 2d 1088.) The 1911 Census shows that in Ollerton K.F.W. Barker had a governess.

Barker was a sportswoman, and in her youth her free time was occupied with, "riding, beagling and otter hunting", (Note: Note: Hunting otters and foxes is now ilegal in the United Kingdom. Otters are protected under the Wildlife and Countryside Act 1981 and the Conservation of Habitats and Species Regulations 2017) along with her sister Doris. She did not marry, and died on 1 April 1963 at Thorn Lea, 16 Duchy Road, where she had lived for most of her life. Her neighbour, who knew her and received gifts of books from her during his childhood, described her as, "a daunting and rather reclusive old lady ... gruff but kind". Historian Paul Jennings said that she became so isolated that when she died, "milk had not been collected and the door had to be broken down". Although she wrote many children's books, and her illustrations were popular, in common with other forgotten women artists and writers there were no newspaper obituaries of her. Her books continued to be advertised beyond the end of her life, nevertheless. She was buried at Stonefall Cemetery not far from her parents and alongside her sister Gladys.

=== Personality ===
In her introduction to Just Dogs (1933), Barker speaks her mind about the cross-breed dogs that she has drawn, and about her own attitude to them. At age 32, she is not the retiring and poorly-educated spinster of Victorian popular imagination:

I must reluctantly confess ... that the majority of my dog friends portrayed here are, alas, only the ordinary children of ordinary parents; in fact some few among them fail to reach even this standard, but, being the care-free result of some light-hearted and fantastic mésalliance, remain Just Dogs ... It is astonishing the pains we take to defend the points of our dogs, and if, as is sometimes unfortunately the case, the said points are too glaringly non-existent, how easily and gracefully we fall back on some outstanding virtue in the dog's character, or some engaging little way that he has, and dangle this in front of our critics ... [and on imagining dog heaven:] And all the old hounds I think will be young again, rousing the echoes with their wild joyous crash of music as once again they're on the line, hunting the elusive otter to his holt in some dark and secret pool; spreading out over the heather in tireless pursuit of a royal stag, and fleeting over the grass on the scent of a game red fox, who, of course, heaven being heaven, would have no objection to being chased.

== Career ==
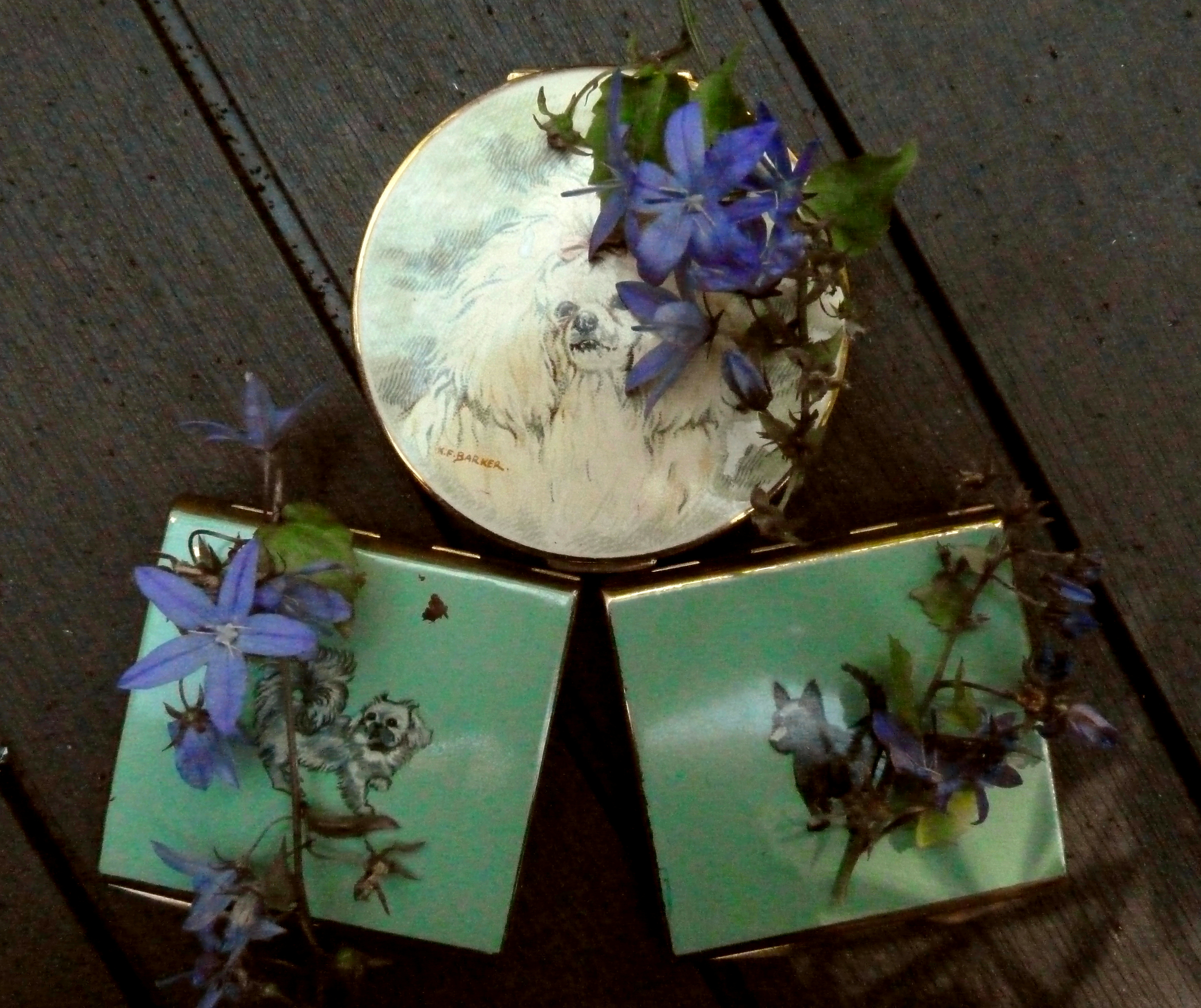
Powder compacts with dog designs by Barker

Between 1933 and 1961 Barker worked as an illustrator, and author of children’s books. Her illustrations, such as Bulldog, the Gamest Fighter of all Time, (Note: Dog fighting has been illegal in the United Kingdom since 1911. However during Barker's era the bulldog also symbolised British jingoism and the soldiers of the First World War..) were reproduced in the Yorkshire Evening Post and The Field Tailwagger. Most of her illustrations represent animals, especially horses and dogs. Chris Beetles of Chris Beetles Gallery says: "Employing pen, ink and pencil, she depicted her subjects with care and affection, often concentrating on their appearance and behaviour to the exclusion of extraneous setting or action". In 1955, Stratton was producing powder compacts decorated with reduced-size copies of Barker's dog studies, and describing her as "K.F. Barker, the famous canine artist".

It was not possible for Barker to find commissions during the Second World War, but she started publishing again in the 1950s. As of 2024, her original drawings continued to be saleable.

== Reviews ==
=== Just Dogs (1933) and reprints ===
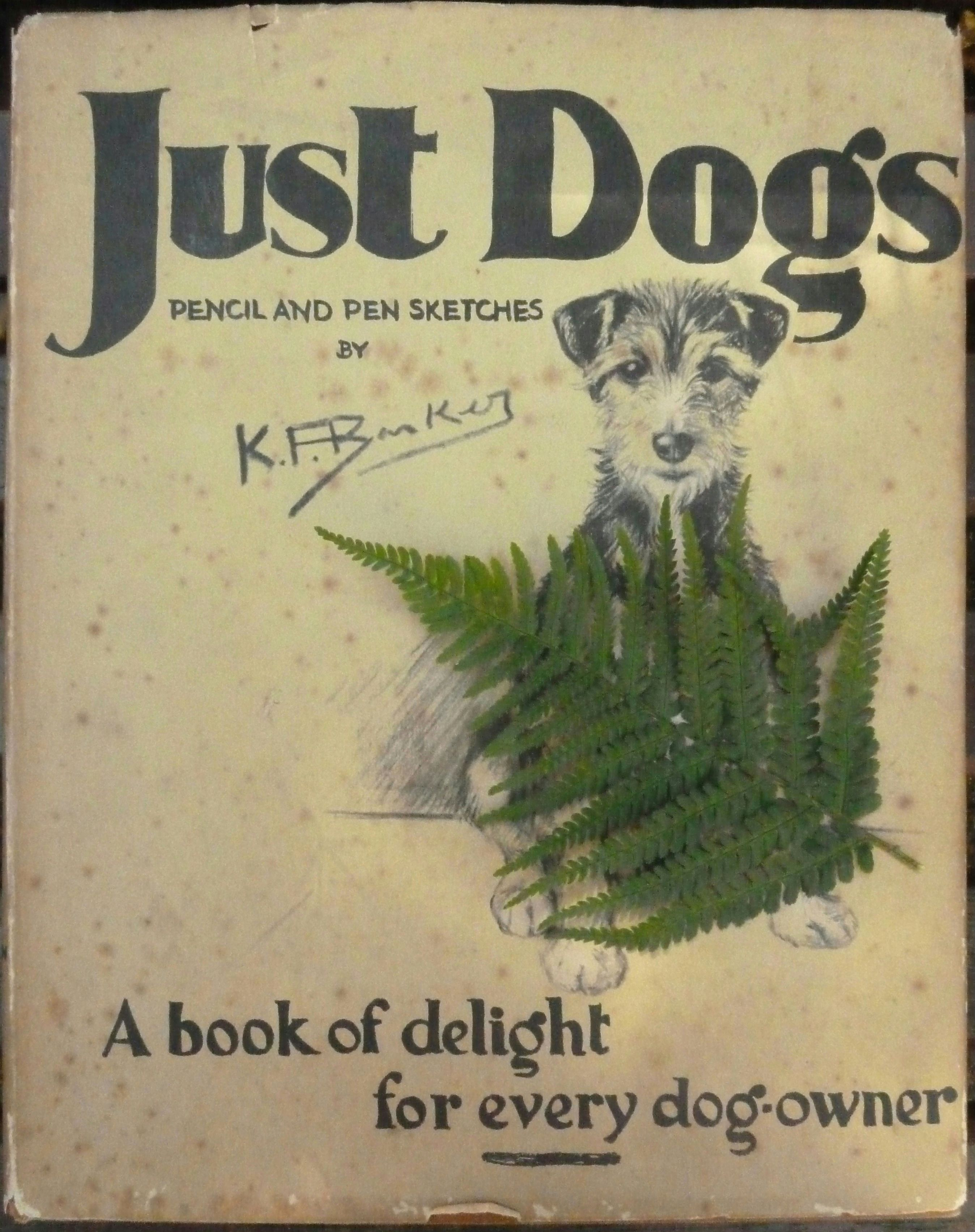
Just Dogs (1933) by Barker

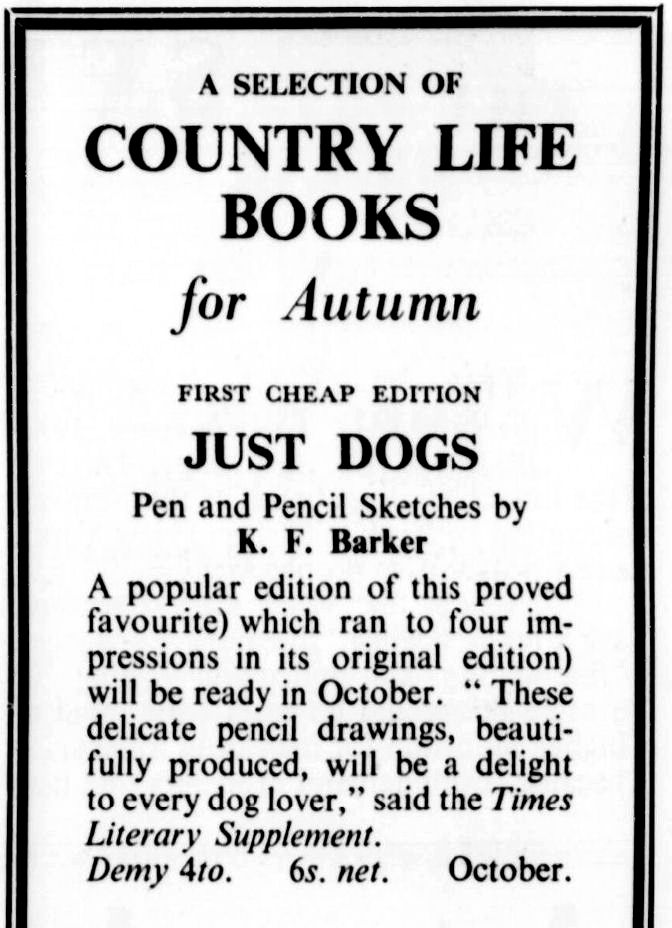
Ad for Just Dogs, 1935

This early book, published at a price of 10s 6d (equivalent to £32.49 in 2025), drew attention. A Country Life advertisement of 1935 quotes a Glasgow Herald review: "K.F. Barker draws a dog almost as well as Mr Dowd does a child ...".

In the Western Mail', the Welsh reviewer Frederick John Mathias, (Note: Frederick John Mathias (Haverfordwest 1879 – Cardiff 4 November 1934). GRO index: Births Sep 1879 Mathias Frederick John Haverfordwest 11a 883. Deaths Dec 1934 Mathias Frederick J. 55 Cardiff 11a 341.) who could at other times be "bruising" and "scarifying" according to Elisabeth Inglis-Jones, discusses Just Dogs in 1933:

The artist possesses a genius for discovering the personalities of dogs and catching them in every place of crime, mischief and saintly endeavour. The result is a picture gallery mostly of rogues, but such lovable, cheerful, waggish rogues, for what the photograph hides the sketch can reveal. But why Just Dogs? Simply because any dog has a place in this popular gallery, no matter whether his pedigree is painful or his ancestors unknown ... One glance at this book will reveal its merits ... here you see the poses magnified and beautified by perfect draughtsmanship ... Every dog in every picture tells in its own way a delightful story.

In 1933, Time and Tide magazine, assuming incorrectly that K.F. Barker is a man, reviews Just Dogs thus:

Mr Barker's clever pencil gives us to perfection the scrambling rush of the terrier, the bounding onslaught of the Aberdeen, the wolf-lke padding of the Alsatian, the spurning pride of the Pekingese. His word-sketches are simple and pleasant and full of kindness and good sense aimed at the selfishness of people who keep dogs under-exercised and over-fed, in city houses and flats. I think his plea for not exercising "Pekes" is, however, quite wrong ...

Time and Tide was not the only publication to carry the assumption that K.F. Barker indicated a man. John O'London's Weekly has this undated review: "Mr K.F. Barker has an uncanny skill in drawing dogs. He can put a dog's whole character into the expression in its eye". Moreover, the dust cover of the 1937 reprint of Just Dogs carries that quotation without demur. The same dust cover carries a second quotation – also undated – from the Times Literary Supplement, and part of the same quote was repeated in a 1935 Country Life advertisement:

These delicate pencil drawings, beautifully reproduced, will be a delight to every dog lover; the artist has caught his models on their lawful and unlawful occasions in characteristic attitudes, and has added some obita dicta on dogs and their ways to accompany them by way of text.

=== Other books, illustrations, and drawings ===
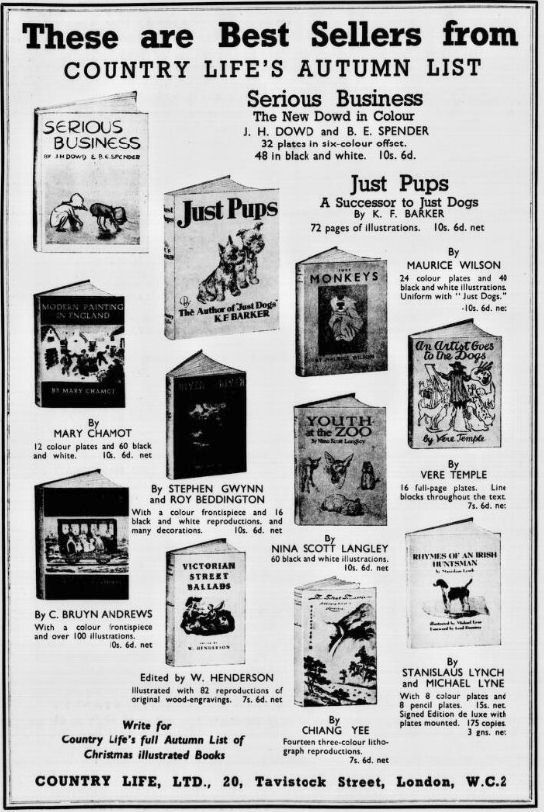
An ad giving some prominence to Just Pups, 1937

The Scots Magazine reviews Barker's Traveller's Joy (1934): "Most knowledgeable ... an extremely good story of a foal ... The book is distinctive for its author's sound knowledge of horses, and for the definite probability of situations. The book is well illustrated in black and white by the author". Of Barker's Himself (1935), the Shrewsbury Chronicle says: The illustrations, from pencil and pen and ink sketches by the author, are charming". Regarding Barker's 1937 book, Just Pups, the Yorkshire Evening Post comments:

It is in the drawings ... that Miss Barker excels. Many people have drawn dogs, but few can suggest temperament or mood. And if it can be doubted that in plain black and white it is possible to show a sardonic gleam in one pink-rimmed eye – of a Dalmatian in this case – the achievement is there, with many other expressions and types equally elusive.

Reviewing Barker's The Young Entry (1939), the Gloucestershire Echo says:

Few writers have treated the subject [of hunting] more instructively or entertainingly from the point of view of the beginner than has K. F. Barker ... To child riders to hounds, The Young Entry will be specially useful, for it tells them in clear and simple language everything that a beginner ought to know. The book is delightfully illustrated with drawings by the author.

== Publications ==
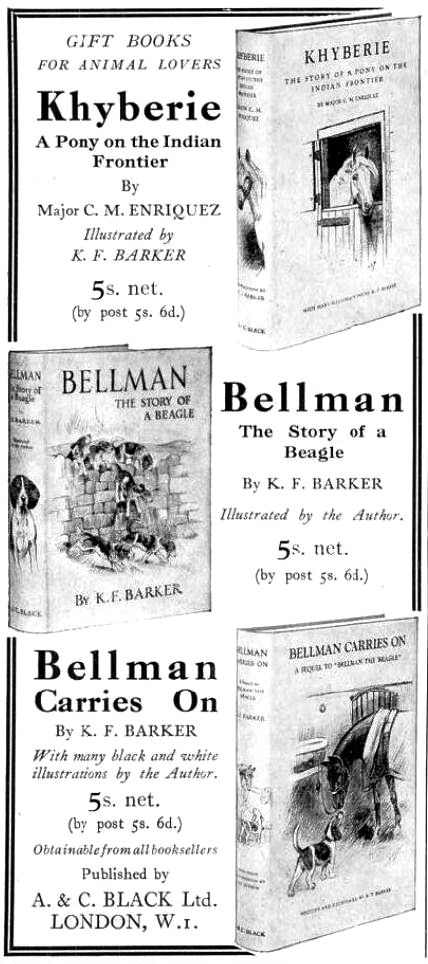
Ad for books by Barker, 1934

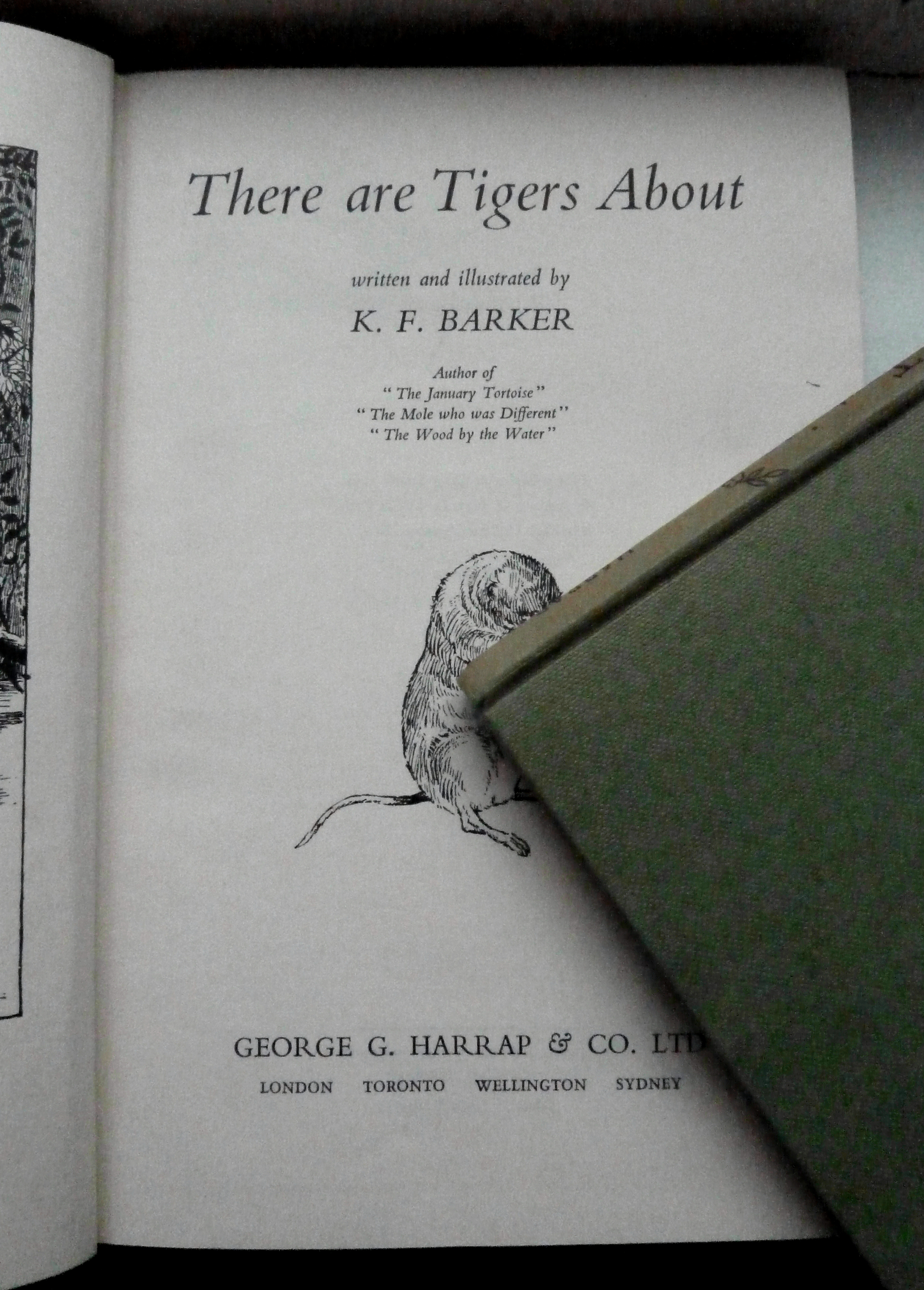
Title page of There are Tigers About (1958)

Note: this may be an incomplete list.

- Barker, Kathleen Frances (1933). Just Dogs : sketches in pen and pencil. London, New York: Country Life Ltd.; Charles Scribner's Sons. "Reprinted 1935, 1936"
- Barker, Kathleen Frances (1933). Bellman: the Story of a Beagle. London: A. & C. Black.
- Barker, Kathleen Frances (1933). Bellman Carries On. London: A & C Black.
- Buckingham, M.E.; Barker, Kathleen Frances (1933). Phari, the Adventures of a Tibetan Pony (1 ed.). UK: Country Life. "Written by Buckingham, illustrated by Barker"
- Barker, Kathleen Frances (1934). Traveller's Joy: Gentleman & Puller. London: Country Life.
- Buckingham, M.E.; Barker, Kathleen Frances (1934). Zong: a Hill Pony. London: Country Life. "Written by Buckingham, illustrated by Barker"
- Enriquez, C.M.D.; Barker, Kathleen Frances (1934). Khyberie: the Story of a Pony on the Indian Frontier. London: A & C Black. "Written by Enriquez, illustrated by Barker"
- Grand, Gordon; Barker, Kathleen Frances (1934). The Silver Horn: Sporting Tales of John Weatherford. London: Country Life. "Written by Grand, illustrated by Barker"
- Barker, Kathleen Frances (1935). Himself. London: Country Life.
- Sturges, Frediswid; Barker, Kathleen Frances (1935). Dowsha: the Story of a Donkey. London: A & C Black. "Written by Sturges, illustrated by Barker"
- Barker, Kathleen Frances (5 February 1936). Champion: the story of a bull terrier who was "not quite". London: Country Life Ltd.
- Sewell, Anna; Barker, Kathleen Frances (1936). Black Beauty. "Written by Sewell, illustrated by Barker"
- Barker, Kathleen Frances (1937). Just Pups: Sketches in pen and pencil. London: Country Life.
- Barker, Kathleen Frances (1937). Nothing but Horses (1 ed.). London: A. & C. Black ltd.
- Ollivant, Alfred; Barker, Kathleen Frances (1937). Owd Bob: the Grey Dog of Kenmuir. London: William Heinemann. "Written by Ollivant, illustrated by Barker"
- Fitzgerald, M.; Barker, K. F. (1937). The Mouse's Hour. London: Country Life. "Written by Fitzgerald, illustrated by Barker".
- Barker, Kathleen Frances (1938). Dog Days. UK: William Heinemann. "With drawings in colour and black and white"
- Barker, Kathleen Frances. (1938). Nothing but Dogs (1 ed.). UK: Adam and Charles Black.
- Cornwallis-West, G.; Barker, Kathleen Frances (1938). Us Dogs. London: Country Life. "Written by Cornwallis-West, illustrated by Barker."
- Barker, Kathleen Frances (1939). Rogues' Gallery. London: Heinemann.
- Barker, Kathleen Frances (1939). The Young Entry. Fox-hunting, Beagling and Otter-Hunting for Beginners. London: A & C Black.
- Stern, G.B.; Barker, Kathleen Frances (1942). Dogs in an Omnibus (Short Story Index Reprint Series). Ayer Co Pub. ISBN 9780836936056. "Written by Stern, illustrated by Barker. This collection includes: The Dark Gentleman, Toes Unmasked, The Ugly Dachshund."
- Stern, G.B.; Barker, Kathleen Frances (1942). The Ugly Dachshund. U.K.: J. N. Townsend Publishing. ISBN 9781880158159. "Republished 1998. Authored by Stern, illustrated by Barker."
- Jeans, Angela; Barker, Kathleen Frances (1950). Harry the Peke. London: A.& C. Black Ltd. "Written by Jeans, illustrated by Barker."
- Barker, Kathleen Frances (1955). The January Tortoise. London: George G. Harrap & Co.
- Barker, Kathleen Frances (1955). The Mole who was Different. London: George G. Harrap & Co.
- Barker, Kathleen Frances (1957). The Wood by the Water. London: George G. Harrap & Co. "Written and illustrated by K.F. Barker"
- Barker, Kathleen Frances (1958). There Are Tigers About. London: George G. Harrap & Co.
- Smythe, Reginald Harrison (1958). The Mind of the Dog (1 ed.). London: Country Life Ltd. "Illustrations by K.F. Barker"
- Smythe, R.H.; Barker, Kathleen Frances (1959). How Animals Talk. London: Country Life. "Written by Smythe, illustrated by Barker."
- Barker, Kathleen Frances (1961). Me and my dog: The pedigree boxer and the alley kitten (1 ed.). London: Country Life Books.
