= Strutton =

Strutton is a surname of English origin, being a variant of the surname Stratton. Notable people with the surname include:

- Benjamin Strutton (1892–1968), English cricketer
- Bill Strutton (1918–2003), Australian screenwriter and novelist
- Charlie Strutton (born 1989), English professional footballer
- Edith Munnings (1867–1939), later known as Edith Strutton, New Zealand artist and missionary

== See also ==
- Strutton Ground Market, a street market near Victoria, London
- Strutton Islands, an island group in Nunavut, Canada
- Stratton (surname)
- Stratten, a surname
