= Grover Lewis =

American journalist

- Born: November 8, 1934; San Antonio, Texas, US
- Died: April 16, 1995 (aged 60); Los Angeles, California, US
- Occupations: Journalist, writer, editor
- Writing career
- Genres: Non-fiction, poetry
- Literary movement: New Journalism

Grover Lewis (November 8, 1934 – April 16, 1995) was an American journalist now regarded as one of the forerunners of new journalism. His lengthy examinations of film, music and more in the 1970s included profiles of Paul Newman and The Allman Brothers Band, and an influential piece written about The Last Picture Show. He also did freelance work for The Village Voice and Texas Monthly, and was an editor and contributor to Rolling Stone.

Lewis published two books during his lifetime: I'll Be There in the Morning If I Live, a book of poetry, and Academy All the Way, a collection of essays he wrote for Rolling Stone. In 2005, the University of Texas Press released a compendium of his entire career entitled Splendor in the Short Grass, edited by and with an introduction by Jan Reid and W.K. Stratton, a foreword by Dave Hickey, and a remembrance by Robert Draper.

== Books ==
- I'll Be There in the Morning If I Live (poetry)
- Academy All the Way (collection)
- Splendor in the Short Grass (collection)

== Personal life ==
When he was 8 years old, his parents, Grover Sr. and Opal, "shot each other to death with a pawnshop pistol".

Lewis was close friends with Gustav Hasford, author of The Short-Timers, the book that was adapted into the feature film Full Metal Jacket. Lewis wrote in-depth essays on Hasford at the height of his notoriety and after his death.

== Filmography ==
| Year | Title | Role | Notes |
|---|---|---|---|
| 1971 | The Last Picture Show | Mr. Crawford | |
| 1972 | The Candidate | Himself (Rolling Stone) | (final film role) |
