= Wright Barker =

British artist (1863–1941

Wright Barker R.B.A.
- Born: 16 July 1863; Great Horton, Bradford, West Riding of Yorkshire, England
- Died: 10 March 1941 (aged 77); Harrogate, West Riding of Yorkshire, England
- Resting place: Stonefall Cemetery, Harrogate
- Other name: John Wright Barker
- Education: Académie Julian
- Known for: Animal paintings; Landscape paintings; Portrait paintings
- Children: Kathleen Frances Barker

Signature
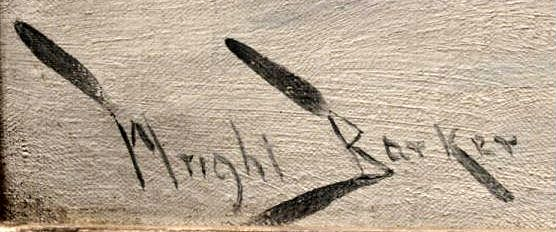

Wright Barker (16 July 1863 – 10 March 1941), known professionally as Wright Barker, but socially as John Wright Barker, was an English painter in oils. He specialised in painting domesticated animals, hunting, landscapes and portraits, but occasionally he depicted other subjects, such as Greek mythology. After training at the Académie Julian, he produced much of his work in Nottinghamshire and Yorkshire, although he also painted some pictures in the Scottish Highlands and in Poland. He was elected a member of the Royal Society of British Artists (RBA) in 1896.

Barker painted portraits of Count Potocki, the Duke and Duchess of Portland, Lord Barnby, the Duke of Peneranda of Spain, and Edward VII's dog Caesar. He also executed a bronze sculpture of the racehorse St Simon. His classical scene of Circe, now in the Cartwright Hall, Bradford, continues to attract comment.

== Background ==
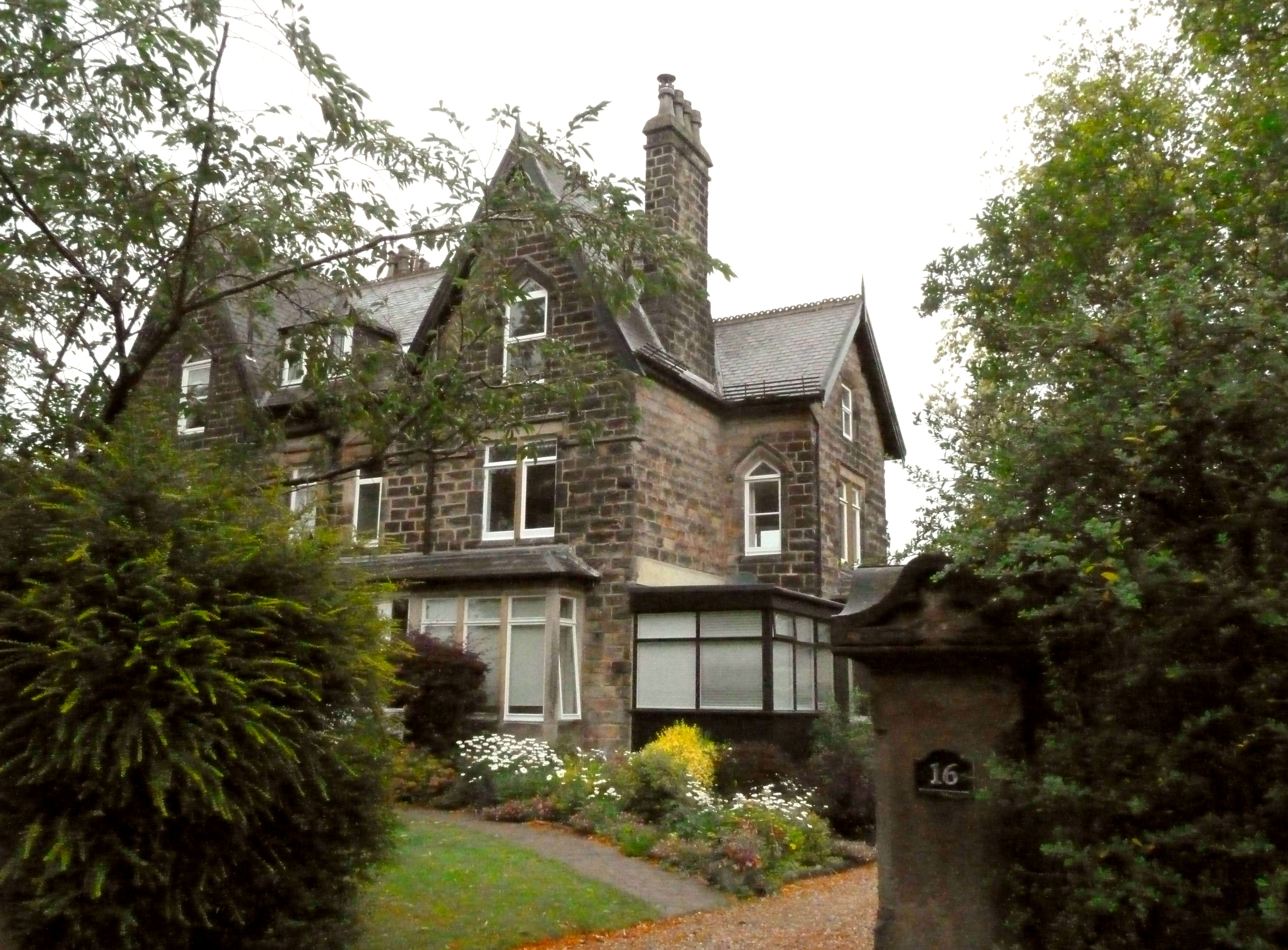
Barker's Harrogate home

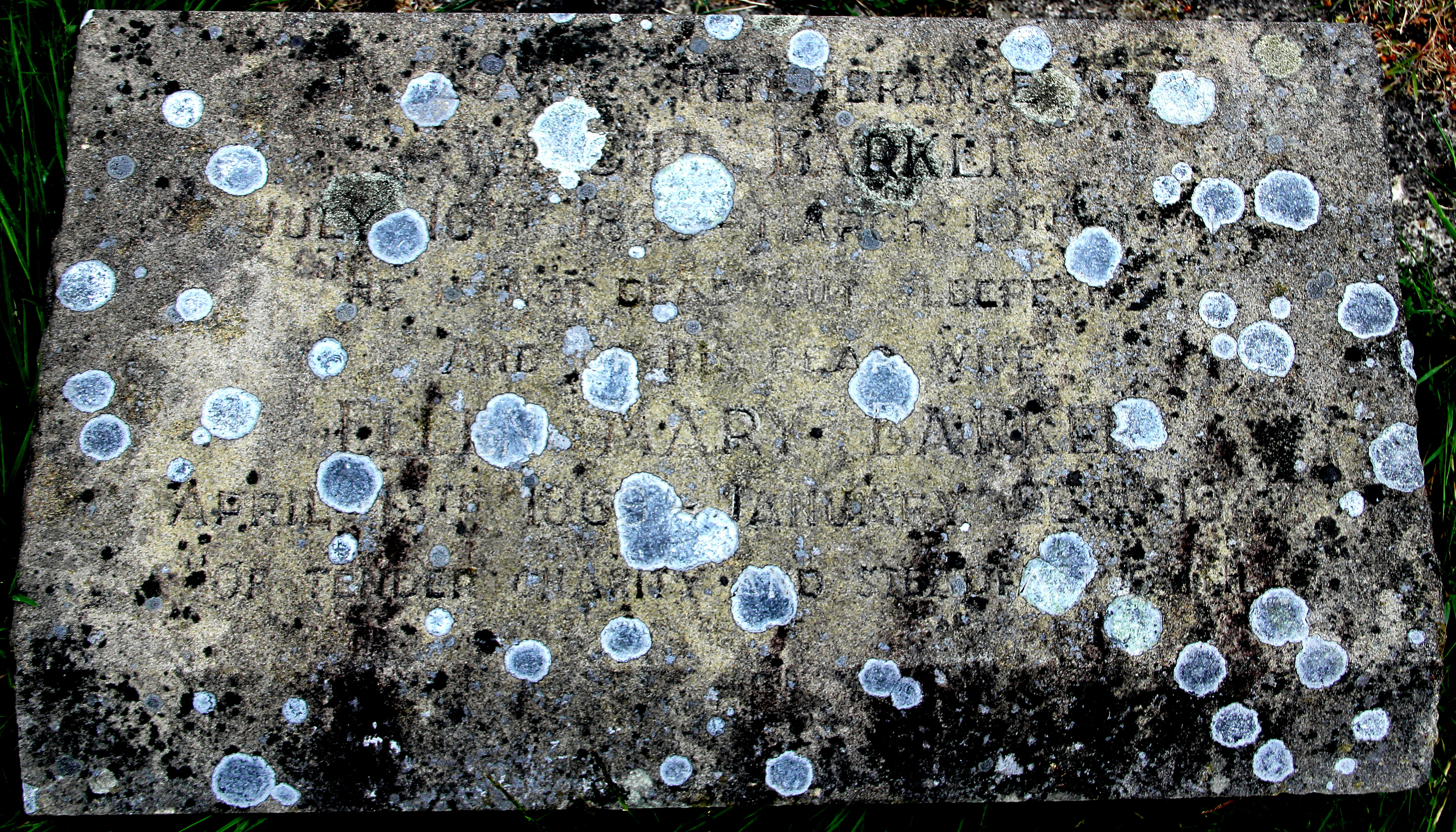
Barker's gravestone

Barker's father, Benjamin Barker, (Note: Benjamin Barker (Clayton 6 August 1831 – Horton, Bradford April 1896). GRO index: Deaths Jun 1896 Barker Benjamin 64 Bradford, Y 9b 83.) was a weaving overlooker or supervisor. He was illiterate at the time of his first marriage, although his wife was not. The first of his three consecutive wives, and the mother of his son Wright Barker, was Lydia Barker née Robinson, (Note: Lydia Barker née Robinson (Great Horton 1834 – West Yorkshire March 1885). GRO index: Marriages Dec 1852 Robinson Lydia and Barker Benjamin. Bradford 9b 49. Deaths Mar 1885 Barker Lydia 51 Bradford, Y. 9b 103.) the daughter of Jonas Robinson, a shoemaker. Lydia Robinson was a worsted weaver. From at least 1871 Benjamin and Lydia Barker lived in Great Horton, Bradford, with their family. In 1891, towards the end of his life, the census finds him as a "weaver of fancy stuffs", still in Horton, with his second wife, Mary.

Barker's birth name and professional name was Wright Barker, (Note: Wright Barker (Great Horton, Bradford 16 July 1863 – Harrogate 10 March 1941). GRO index: Births Sep 1863 Barker Wright Bradford Yk 9b 125. Deaths Mar 1941 Barker Wright 77 Knaresbro' 9a 414.) but he was known socially as John Wright Barker. He was born in Great Horton. He initially lived in Bartle Square, Bradford, with his family. At Holy Trinity Church, Kirton on 10 August 1892, he married Ellen Mary Alcock, (Note: Ellen Mary Barker née Alcock (East Retford 13 April 1868 – Harrogate 20 January 1947). GRO index: Births Jun 1868 Alcock Ellen Mary East Retford 7b 19. Marriages Sep 1892 Barker Wright and Alcock Ellen Mary. Southwell 7b 571. Deaths Mar 1947 Barker Ellen M. 78 Claro 2c 130.) the daughter of a Tuxford farmer. In 1881 the family home was in Falcon Street, Great Horton Road, Great Horton. In 1914 the family moved to Thorn Lea, 16 Duchy Road, Harrogate, where Barker had a studio and they remained there for the rest of their lives.

Barker and his wife had four children: Gladys Wright Barker, (Note: Gladys Wright Barker (Ollerton 15 April 1894 – 2 July 1960). GRO index: Births Jun 1894 Barker Gladys Wright Southwell 7b 423. Deaths Sep 1960 Barker Gladys W. 66 Claro 2c 70.) Doris Wright Barker, PhD, (Note: Doris Wright Barker (Ollerton 12 December 1898 – Selby 1987). GRO index: Births Mar 1898 Barker Doris Wright Southwell 7b 453. Marriages Jun 1928 Barker Doris W. and Murphy William. Knaresbro' 9a 235 Deaths 1987 Murphy Doris Wright 12 December 1898 Selby 2 2709.) who was a teacher and writer, Kathleen Frances Barker, (Note: Kathleen Frances Wright Barker (Ollerton 2 June 1901 – Harrogate 1 April 1963). GRO index: Births Mar 1901 Barker Kathleen Frances W. Southwell 7b 458. Deaths Jun 1963 Barker Kathleen F.W. 62 Claro 2C 74.) who was an artist and writer, and Reginald Wright Barker. (Note: Reginald Wright Barker (born Ollerton 1907).Births Dec 1907 Barker Reginald Wright Southwell 7b 490.) The 1911 Census shows that in Ollerton Barker had a governess, and kept servants there.

Barker was ill for a year before his demise, but his sudden death at 16 Duchy Road, Harrogate, while painting a study of sheep and lambs, was unexpected. The funeral was held at Stonefall Cemetery on 12 March. He and his wife are buried together in Stonefall Cemetery, Harrogate. He left £2,193 (equivalent to £95,716.94 in 2025).

== Career ==
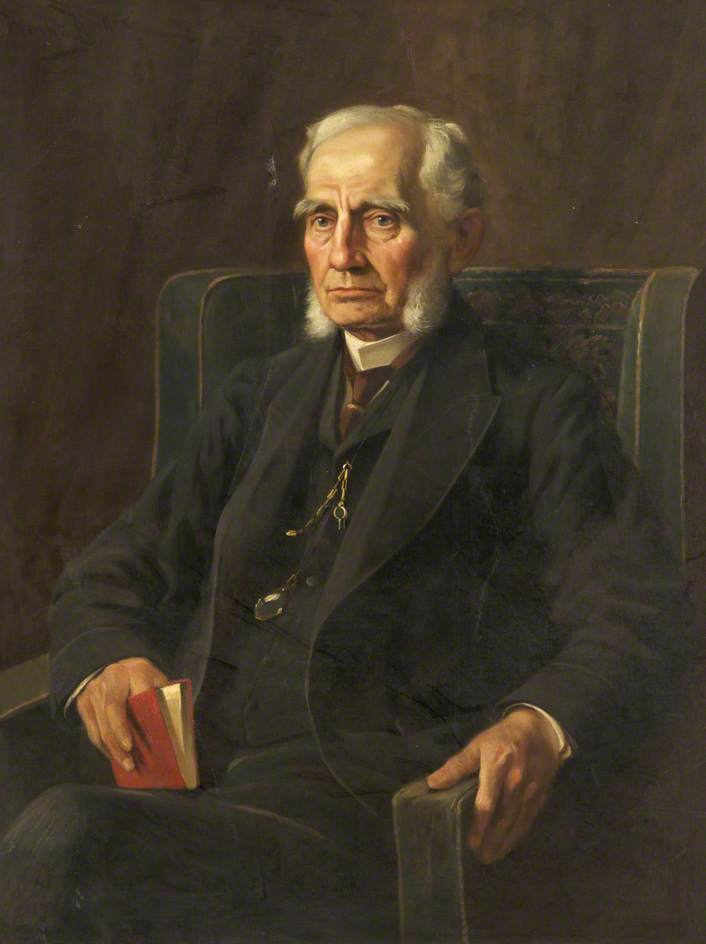
Dr Frank Renaud, 1903

Barker was a painter, sculptor, and possibly a picture dealer in later life. However local directories list him only as "artist", and in his will he describes himself as an "animal painter". He began his working life as a textile worker, employed in a weft room. He lived near Bradford School of Art and may have studied there, although he did study at the Académie Julian in Paris. In 1885, Barker left Bradford and worked as an artist in Edwinstowe and Mansfield, Nottinghamshire, then moved to Hampstead in 1901. In 1889 while at Edwinstowe he painted huntsman Sam Hayes, (Note: Sam Hayes (1850 – March 1893). GRO index: Births Dec 1850 Hayes Sam Mansfield XV 533) of the Rufford Hunt, on his horse Longitude with four pairs of hounds. Barker's father-in-law's ownership of a 475-acre farm, employing nine farm workers, probably gave him a chance to create studies of draft horses and stock. and to meet other farmers.

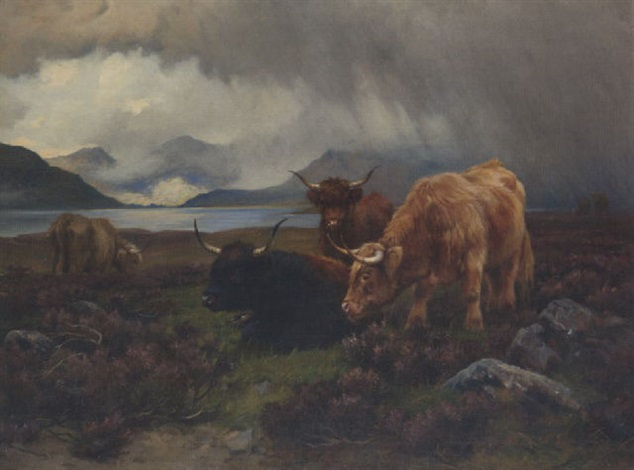
Cattle in a Highland Landscape, 1899

Barker was a painter of hunting, animal, and classical scenes, portraiture, and landscapes in oils. His hunting scenes are mostly of his local Rufford Hunt, in Nottinghamshire. In 1899 and 1900 he was in the Scottish Highlands painting highland cattle. He travelled twice to Poland to visit Count Potocki, painting his portrait and animal pictures. He painted the Duke and Duchess of Portland, and Frank Renaud, a consultant at Manchester Royal Infirmary. He painted Lord Barnby, and the Duke of Peneranda of Spain. In 1905, he was commissioned to execute a life-sized painting of Edward VII's dog Caesar. In later life he cast a bronze sculpture of the racehorse St Simon. Barker's work remains saleable as of 2025.

== Institutions ==
Early in his career, Barker became a member of the Bradford Art Guild, and exhibited at its first show in 1884. In 1896, he was elected a member of the Royal Society of British Artists (RBA).

== Exhibitions ==
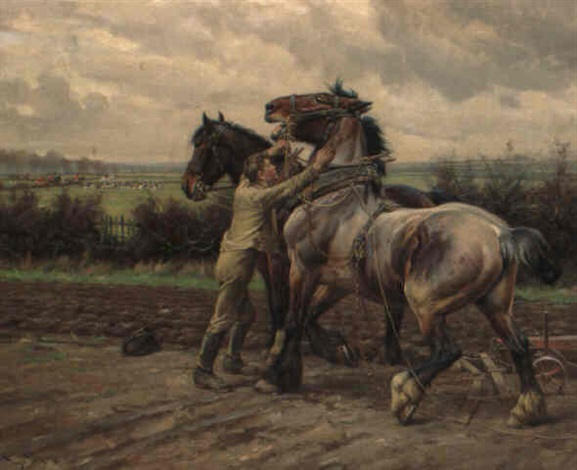
Whoa! Steady!, 1896

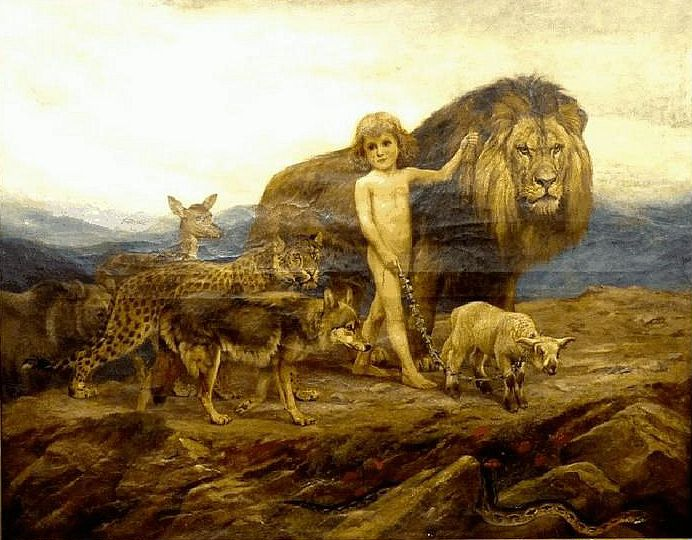
And a Little Child, c.1903

Barker exhibited at various leading galleries from 1891:

- Bradford Art Guild: Unknown works (1883). Three artworks (1884).
- Paris Salon.
- Royal Academy of Arts (1891 –1930s): twenty-two occasions. Barker's first exhibit here was In Forest's Depths Unseen, oil on canvas. In 1896 he exhibited Whoa! Steady!, which was subsequently sold in the form of framed copies, and exhibited in a grocer's shop in Southport. In 1903 he exhibited And a Little Child Shall Lead Them.
- Studio of artist A.E. Perrin, Northampton (1894): Various works by Barker.
- Arthur Rigg's Galleries, Bradford (1895): paintings of animals.
- Royal Society of British Artists (RBA): twenty-eight occasions. Barker exhibited regularly here.
- Royal Scottish Academy: one occasion.
- Yorkshire Union of Artists.
- Walker Art Gallery, Liverpool: four occasions.
- Royal Society of Artists, Birmingham: one occasion.
- Manchester Art Gallery: one occasion.
- Nottingham Museum and Art Gallery: five occasions.
- New Gallery, London: one occasion.

== Collections ==
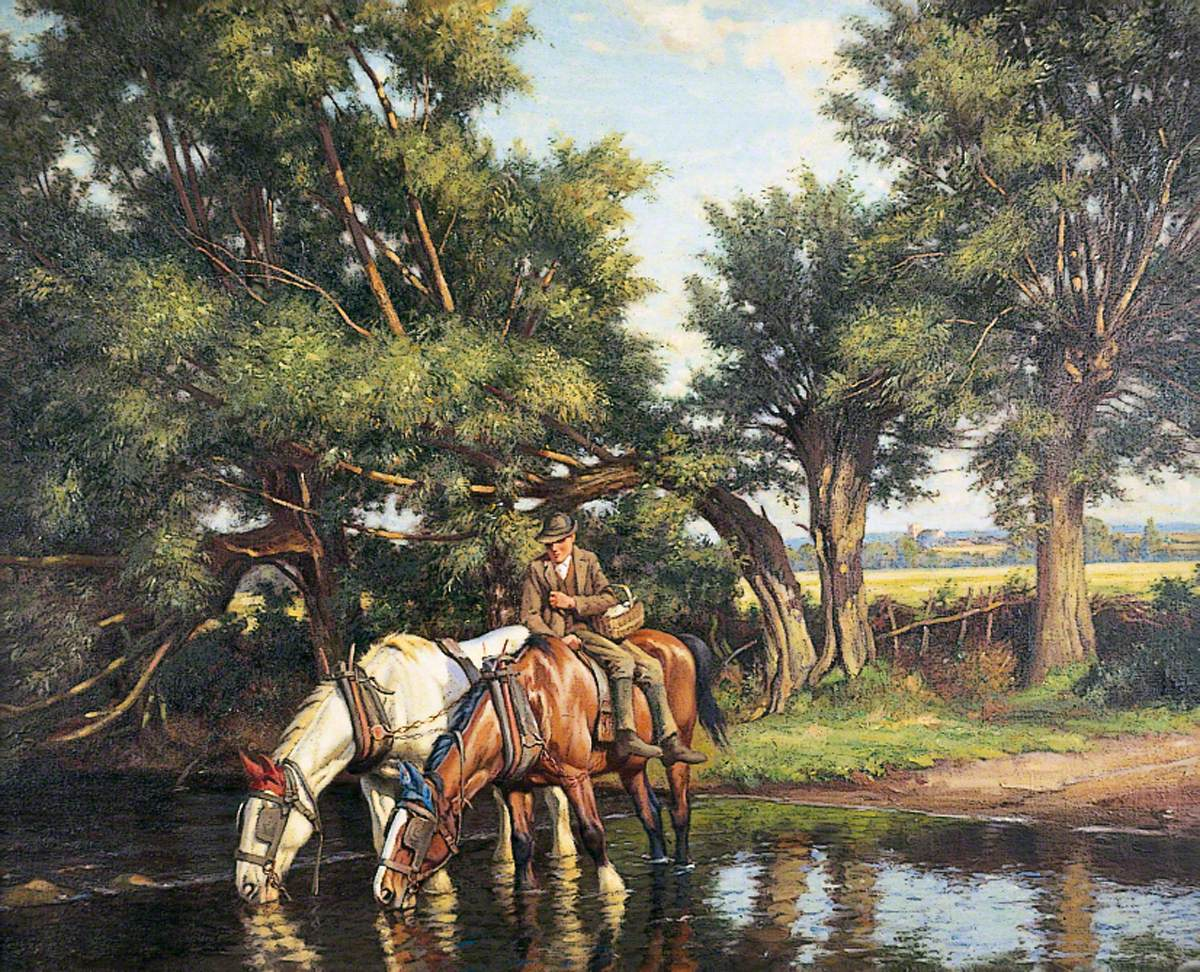
Crossing the Ford, undated

- Cartwright Hall, Bradford: Circe (c.1889), oil on canvas, donated by Barker in 1901, and other paintings.
- Central Manchester University Hospitals NHS Foundation Trust: Dr Frank Renaud (1819–1904), MD; LRCS; LSA (all 1844); FSA; Honorary Physician (1848–1866) and Consulting Physician (1866–1902), Manchester Royal Infirmary (1903), oil on canvas.
- Middlesbrough Town Hall: Albert Edward Forbes, Second Lieutenant (1910–1920), oil on canvas.
- Mercer Art Gallery: Crossing the Ford, oil on canvas.
- Kirklees Museums and Galleries (includes Huddersfield Art Gallery): Scotch Cattle, oil on canvas; Devil's Bridge, oil on canvas.
- Ferens Art Gallery: Farm Horses and Foal at a Ford c.1915, oil on canvas;
- Mansfield District Council: Tree and Rabbits (1894), oil on canvas. Horses in a Paddock, oil on canvas; Deer in a Forest, oil on canvas.
- Collection of Sir Thomas Shipstone, director of James Shipstone & Sons, Nottingham: the painting, Loch Ochray.

== Reviews and responses ==
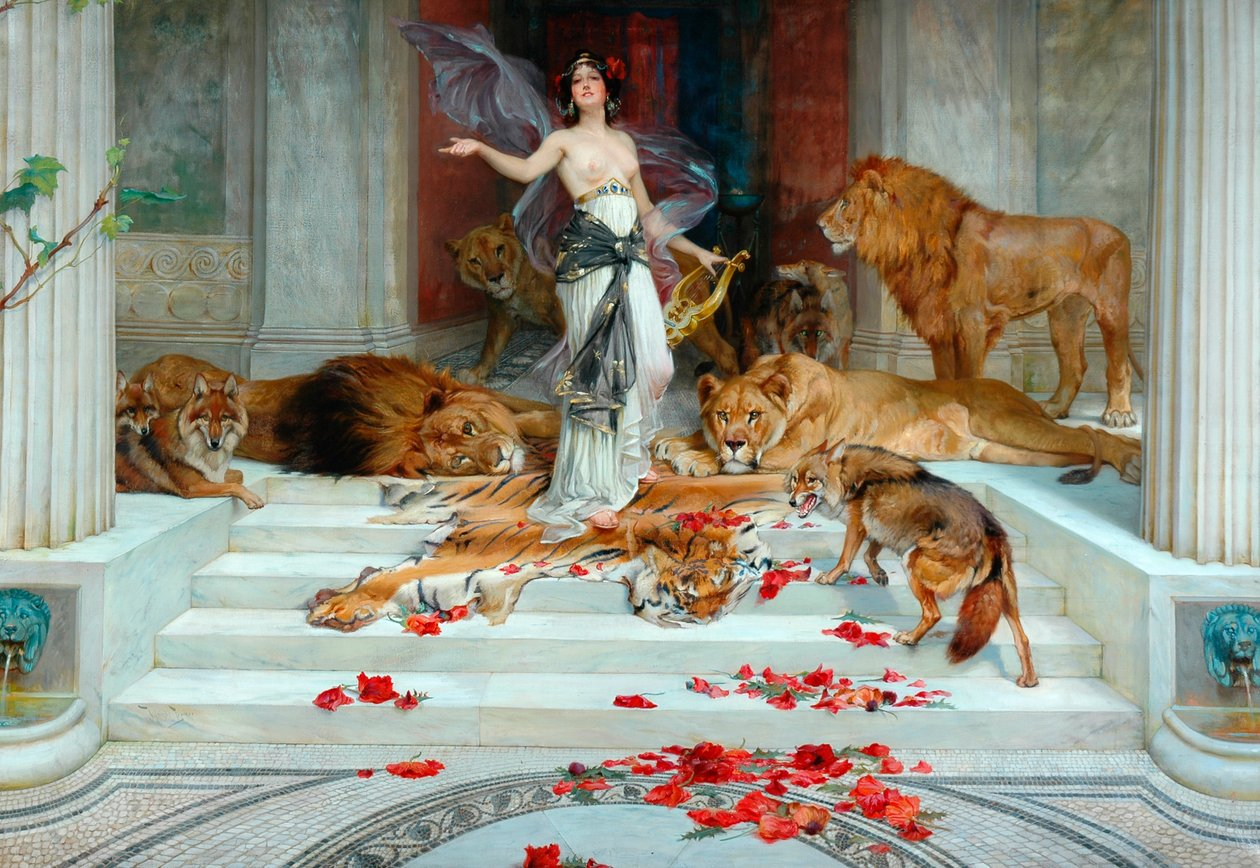
Circe, 1889

R. L. Commings comments on Barker's Circe (1889) in 2019:

British realist artist Wright Barker ... was an excellent draughtsman of domesticated animals, including dogs, fine horses, and cattle ... The foray into mythology was rare for him, and his skill in the shiny, silky furs of the lions, tigers and wolves nearly outshines the seductive Circe. She stands at the entrance of her luxurious palace, boldly opening her body with open arms and bare breast. She holds a lyre, an uncommon feature of most Circe depictions ...

Lizzie Enfield of the BBC details a 2020 response to the Circe (1889) thus:

Is it time to look at [the depiction of female nudes in art] with fresh eyes? ... [A doll named] ArtActivistBarbie poses with a toy tiger in a parody of the 1889 painting Circe by Wright Barker, showing a topless woman surrounded by lions. In a Twitter post, ArtActivistBarbie imagines the commissioning of the painting ... “‘I’d like a seductive young beauty, half undressed, confined and with some big game,’ said the patron”, the Twitter post reads. “‘How about Circe, say with 5 or 6 tigers?’” said the artist. ‘Everyone will admire your scholarly interest in Greek Mythology.’” With her tongue firmly in her cheek, ArtActivistBarbie asks if this is the depiction of a classical scene or thinly veiled Victorian porn.

However, by 2025, Errika Gerakiti of the Daily Art is referring to Orientalism, either as if Edward Said's book had never existed, or as if Orientalism were not a male gaze but something to be taken up and owned by a woman:

One of the most captivating depictions of Circe in art comes from this painting by Wright Barker. In this work, he portrays her with a commanding and majestic presence. Circe serves as a gracious hostess, inviting viewers into her house. Tame wild animals surround her, while she holds a lyre in her left hand, symbolizing her creative essence. Though her attire and the house’s design carry traces of ancient Greek influence, the overall scene feels more exotic and oriental. An intriguing detail is the scattered poppies on the steps. At first glance, they resemble splashes of blood, enhancing her mysterious, witch-like character.

== Popular culture ==
Copies of at least four of Barker's signed paintings, Clearing the Forest (1890s), Three Horses Watering, Sheep in a Meadow and The Hunt (all painted by him before 1941), were sold by Waddingtons as 470-piece jigsaw puzzles at some point between the 1930s and 1960, as seen in the four Waddington's boxes below. During Barker's lifetime Waddingtons was based in Hunslet, and Keighley. Both locations were within the reach of Barker, who lived in Harrogate.

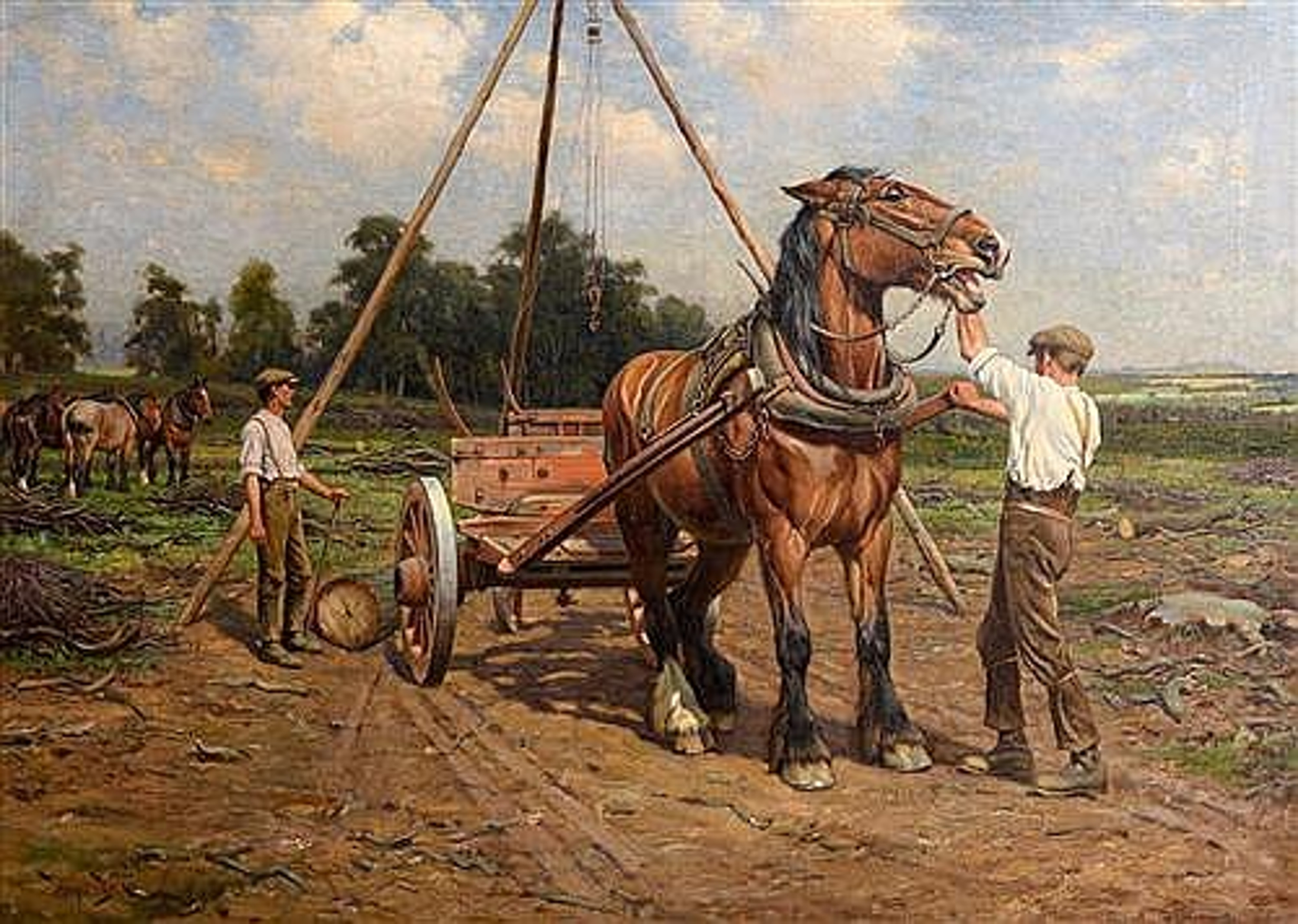
Clearing the Forest (1890s)

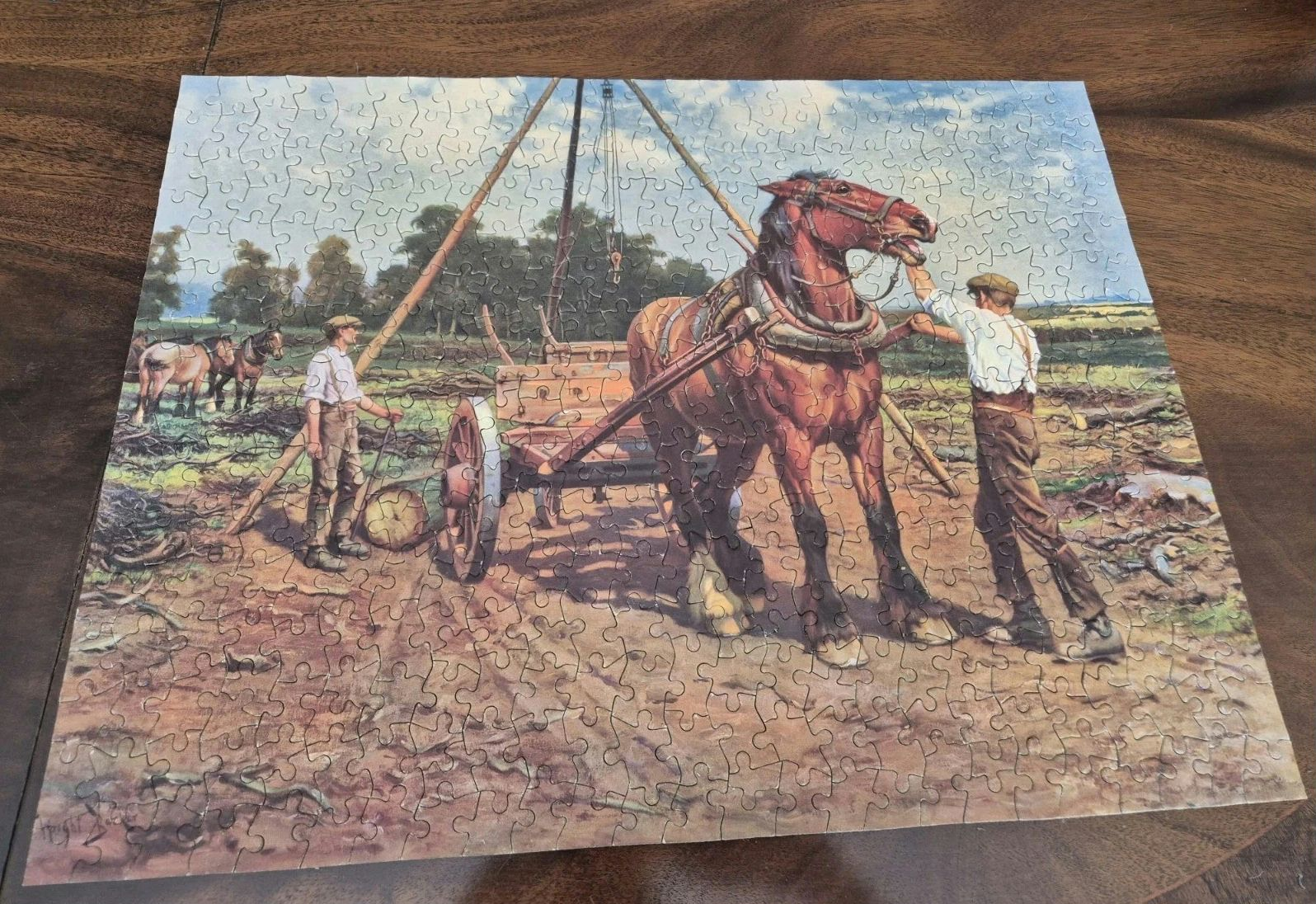
Jigsaw of Clearing the Forest

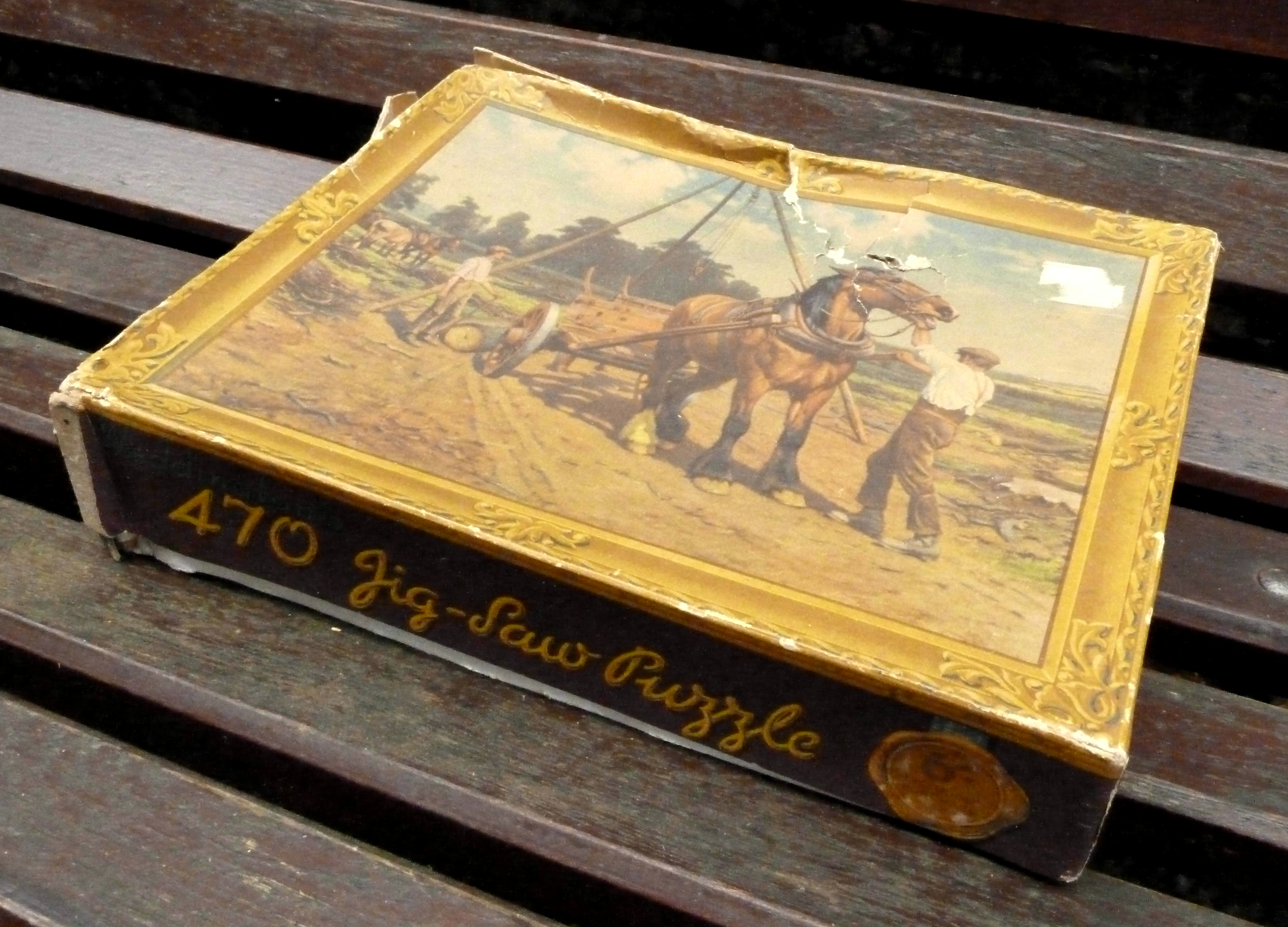
Box for Clearing the Forest jigsaw

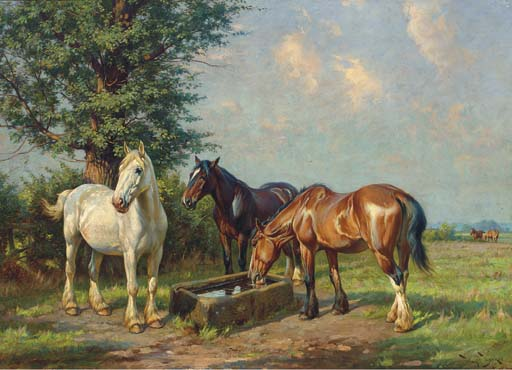
Three Horses Watering (undated)

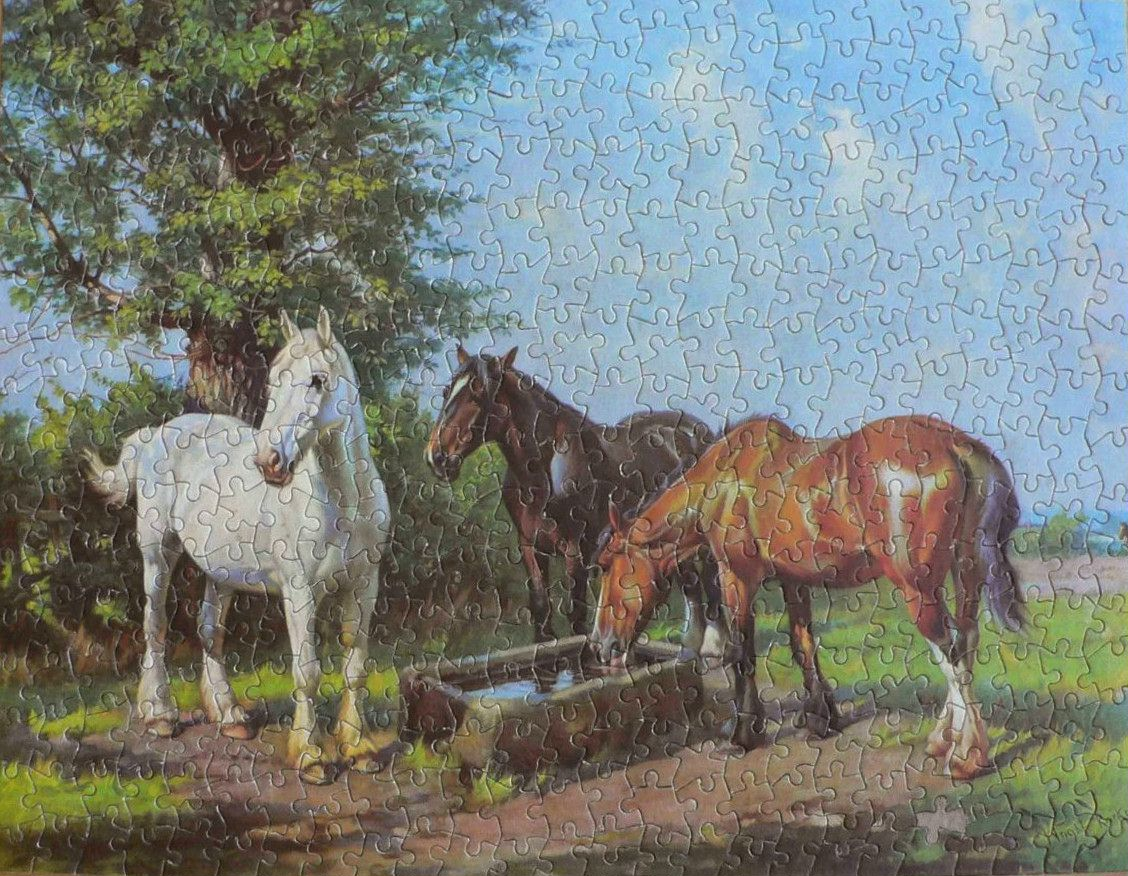
Jigsaw of Three Horses Watering

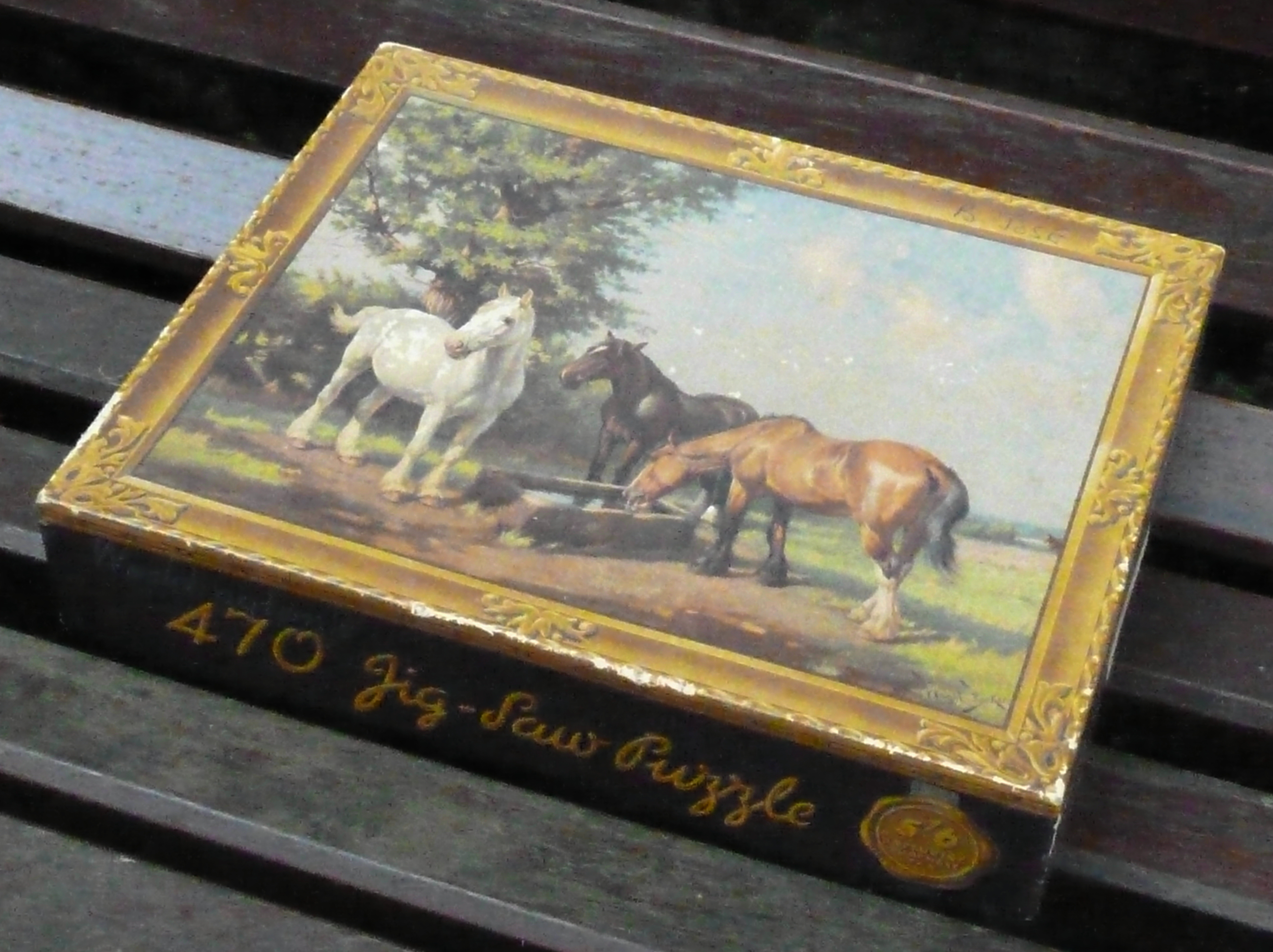
Box for Three Horses Watering

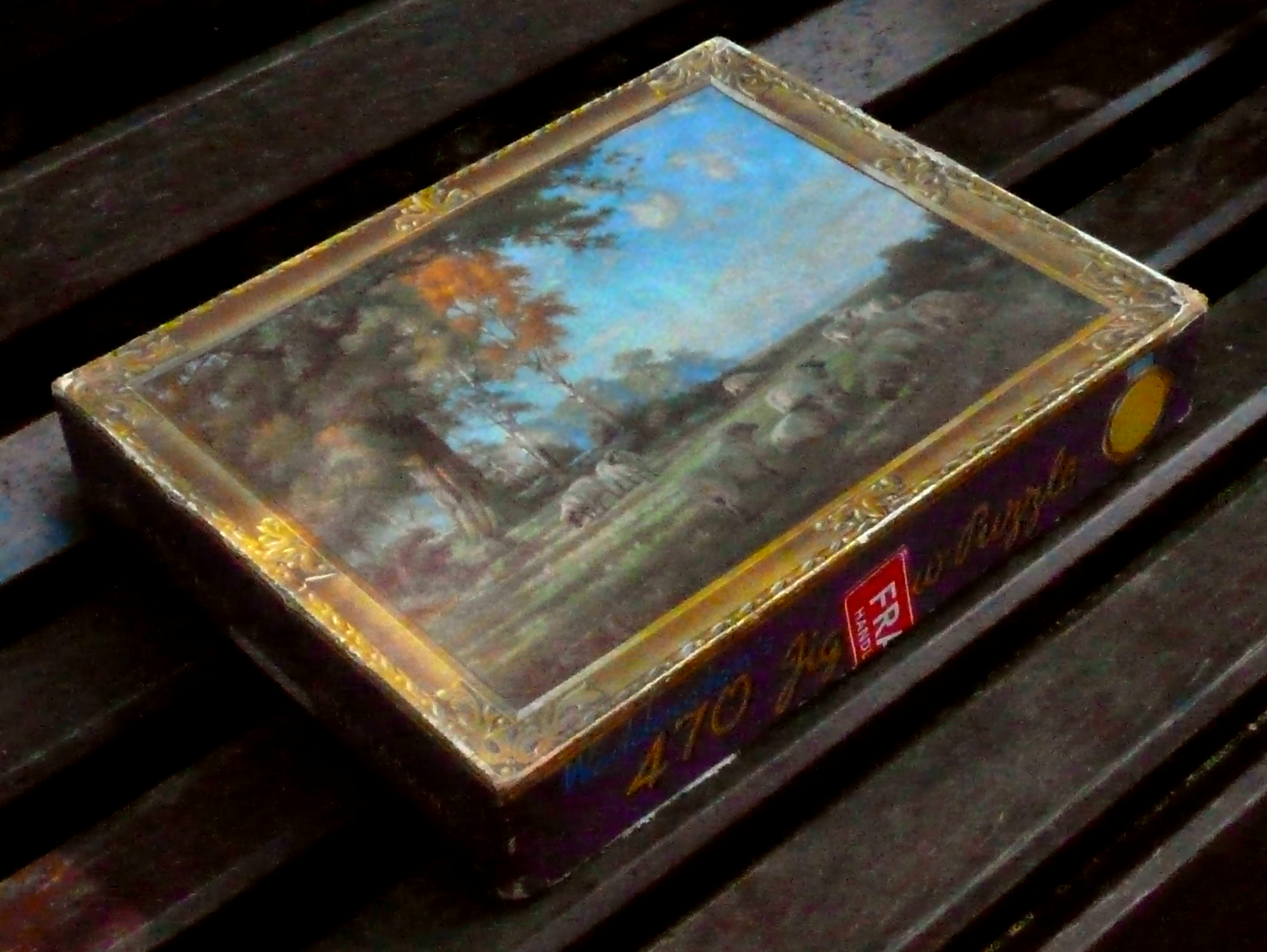
Box for Sheep in a Meadow (before 1941)

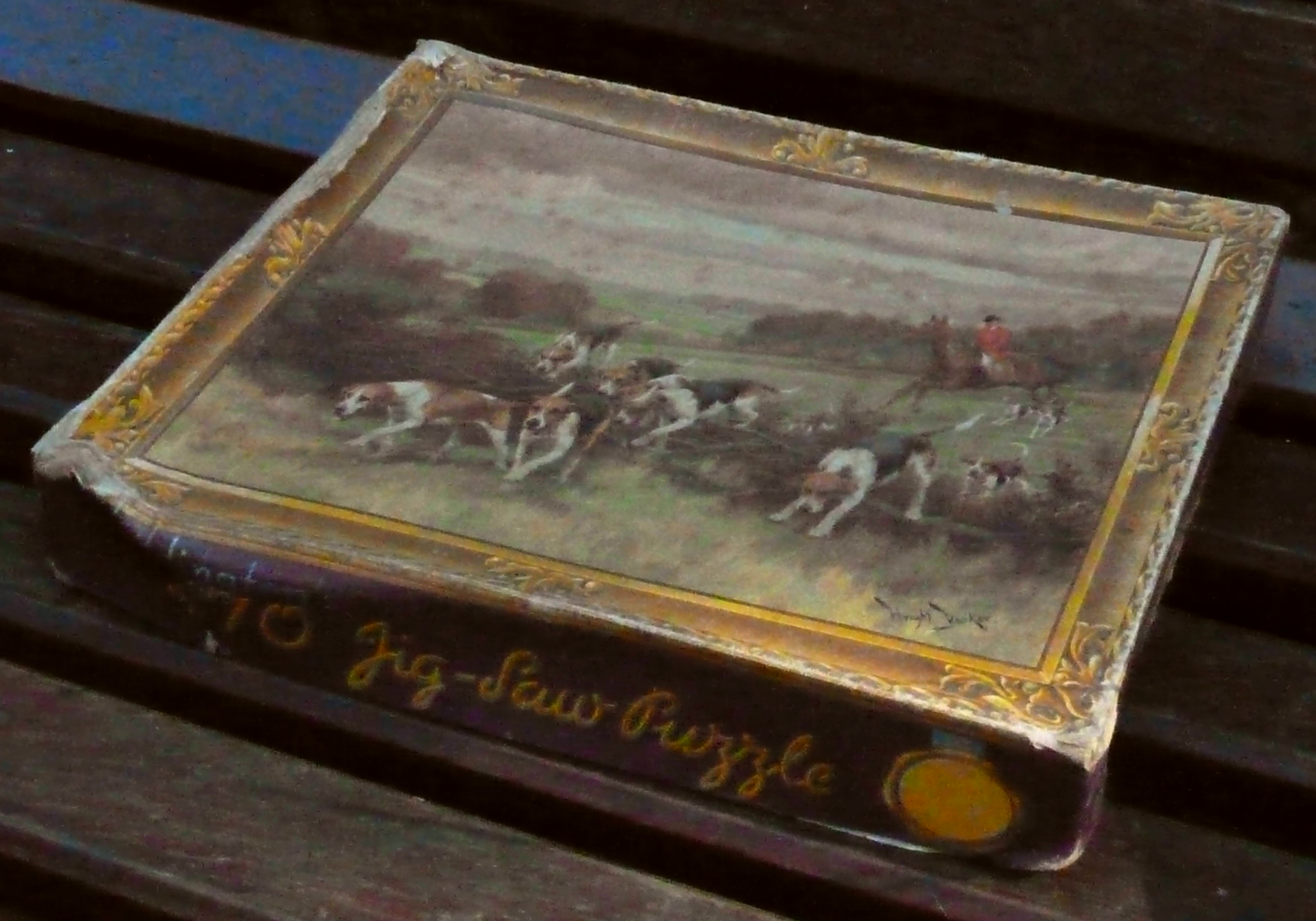
Box for the Hunt (before 1941)
