= William Stratton (disambiguation) =

William Stratton (1914–2001) was an American politician, governor of Illinois.

William Stratton may also refer to:

- William J. Stratton (1886–1938), American politician, secretary of state of Illinois, father of the governor
- William Stratton (British Army officer) (1903–1989)
- William Stratton (RNZAF officer) (1916–2005), New Zealand aviator and military leader
- William C. Stratton, American politician, speaker of the California State Assembly
- W. K. Stratton (writer), American writer
- W. K. Stratton (actor) (born 1950), American actor
- Ed Stratton (William Edward Stratton, 1858–1900), American baseball player
