= Stratton (financial services) =

Australian finance brokerage company

Stratton Finance
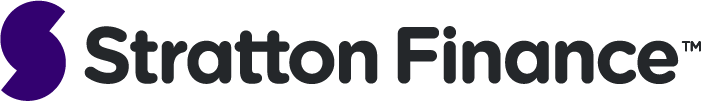
- Type: Private company
- Founded: 1998
- Headquarters: Melbourne, Australia
- Number of locations: 3
- Area served: Australia
- Services: Finance broker, car loans, personal loans, equipment finance
- Number of employees: 170
- Divisions: Car Finance, Novated Leasing, Marine & Leisure Finance, Commercial and Business Finance, Personal Loans
- Website: www.strattonfinance.com.au

Stratton Finance is one of Australia's largest car and asset finance brokers, with offices in most Australian capital cities and a national network of franchises.

Stratton Finance offers business and personal finance for a range of different types of assets including cars, boats and caravans, truck and heavy vehicles, business equipment and machinery as well as a range of insurance products. Stratton Finance has served over 150,000 Australians since 1998 with their asset finance, and has a staff of over 200 people Australia wide.

Stratton Finance is an Australian Finance Broker, accredited by over 40 lenders and insurers, some with exclusive agency.

== History ==
Stratton Finance was established by Rob Chaloner in 1998 as a specialist motor finance broker. The business initially relied on referrals from a Melbourne based Land Rover dealership, but rapidly began attracting word of mouth referrals and a number of finance consultants were employed to meet the growing demand.

In 2002, Stratton Finance launched www.strattonfinance.com.au, and in 2009 launched the first Stratton Finance franchise.

Additionally, in 2012 Stratton Finance invested in its new car buying service, carconnect, utilising a national dealer network to source vehicles for customers at fleet prices.

In 2014, Stratton Finance became part of the Carsales network when it purchased a 50.1% share in the business. In 2015, Stratton Finance acquired All About Finance, which became its marine & leisure division. In 2019 Carsales announced its intended divestment of the business, and in 2020, a team led by Founder Rob Chaloner acquired Carsales's shareholding.

In 2022, Pepper Money acquired a majority stake in Stratton Finance, combining the company's asset finance operations with updated technology systems.

Stratton Finance has been awarded Best Car Loans 2021–2025 (ProductReview) and Best Large-Size Brokerage 2023–2024 & Best Car Loans 2025 (WeMoney) - establishing the business as one of the leading car and asset brokers in Australia.

== Products and services ==
As a finance broker, Stratton Finance offers clients a range of finance products, including Finance lease, Commercial Hire Purchase, Chattel mortgage, Novated lease, Fully Maintained Novated Lease, Consumer Loan and Personal Loans. While predominantly focused on vehicle finance, Stratton Finance also offers finance for a range of different types of assets, including cars, boats and caravans, truck and heavy vehicles, business equipment and machinery.

Stratton Finance consultants and accredited franchisees represent over 40 finance companies, including major lenders Pepper Money, Alphera Financial Services, Macquarie Leasing, Esanda, Commonwealth Bank, GE Money and Liberty Financial Services.

== Franchising program ==
Stratton Finance has company-owned offices in Melbourne, Sydney and Brisbane, and a franchise network which operates in metropolitan and regional areas around Australia.

The franchise program provides business development resources to finance brokers.

Franchisees are provided with a complete franchise system, including finance leads, access to a range of finance products and access to Stratton Finance's proprietary IT capability.

The franchise program, launched in 2009, now includes 20 offices nationwide.

== Licences and professional memberships ==
Stratton Finance holds an Australian Credit Licence (364340), is a Licensed Motor Car Trader (10697) and is a member of several professional and industry organisations that provide consumer protection and industry guidelines and standards.

Stratton Finance is an accredited member of the FBAA (103514), the Franchise Council of Australia and a Credit Ombudsman Service Limited (COSL) member (408706).
