= Kim Stratton =

American gospel musician (born 1961)

- Also known as: Kimberly A. Stratton
- Born: November 7, 1961 (age 64)
- Origin: Chicago, Illinois
- Genres: Gospel, traditional black gospel, urban contemporary gospel
- Occupations: Singer, songwriter
- Instruments: Vocals, singer-songwriter
- Years active: 1994–present
- Labels: Glorious, Kingdom

Kimberly A. Stratton (born November 7, 1961) is an American gospel musician. Her first album, I'm in This Place, was released by Glorious Music in 1994, and this was a Billboard magazine breakthrough release upon the Gospel Albums chart. She released, Live in Chicago with the A.F.C. Choir, with Glorious Records in 1995. The third album, Almost Forgot to Worship, was released in 2007 with Kingdom Records.

== Early life ==
Stratton was born on November 7, 1961, and she is based out of Chicago, Illinois.

== Music career ==
Her music recording career commenced in 1994, with the album, I'm in This Pace, and it was released by Glorious Music on July 11, 1994, and this was her breakthrough release upon the Billboard magazine Gospel Albums chart at No. 18. She released, Live in Chicago with the A.F.C. Choir, in 1995 with Glorious Music. The subsequent album, Almost Forgot to Worship, was released on August 28, 2007 by Kingdom Music.

== Discography ==
List of selected studio albums, with selected chart positions
Title	Album details	Peak chart positions
Title	Album details	US Gos
I'm in This Place	Released: July 11, 1994; Label: Glorious; CD, digital download	18
