= Compact (cosmetics) =

Case with a mirror for face powder

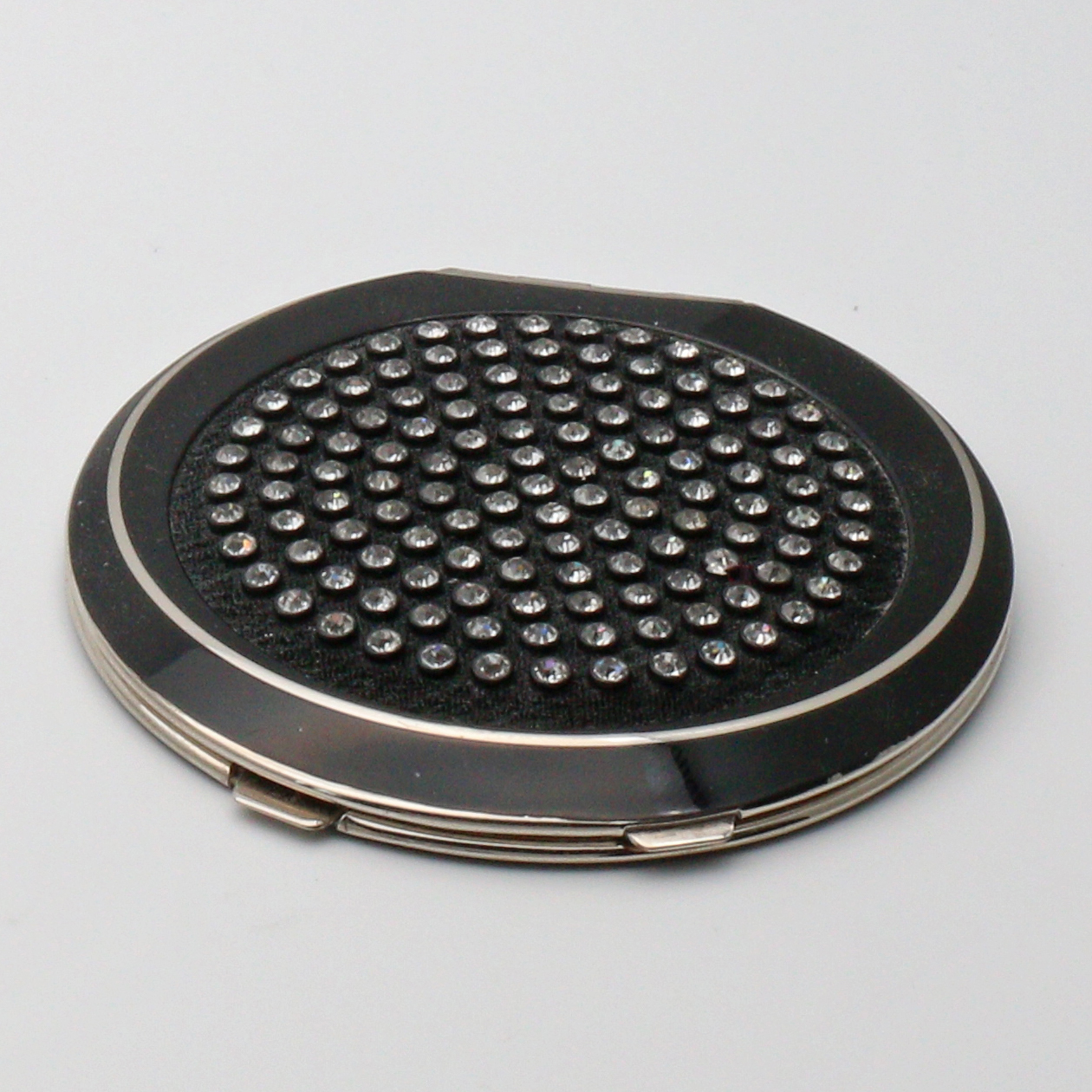
Art Deco Rowenta enamel rhinestone compact

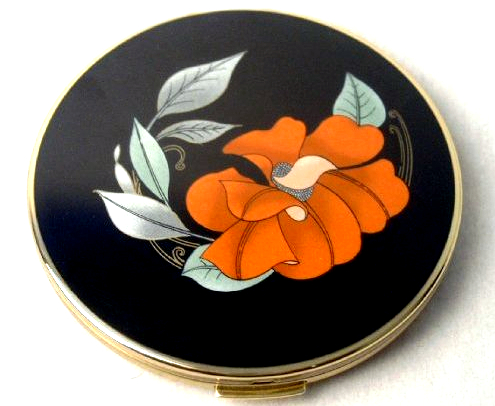
Vintage art deco style compact, c. 1960s, made by Stratton of Birmingham

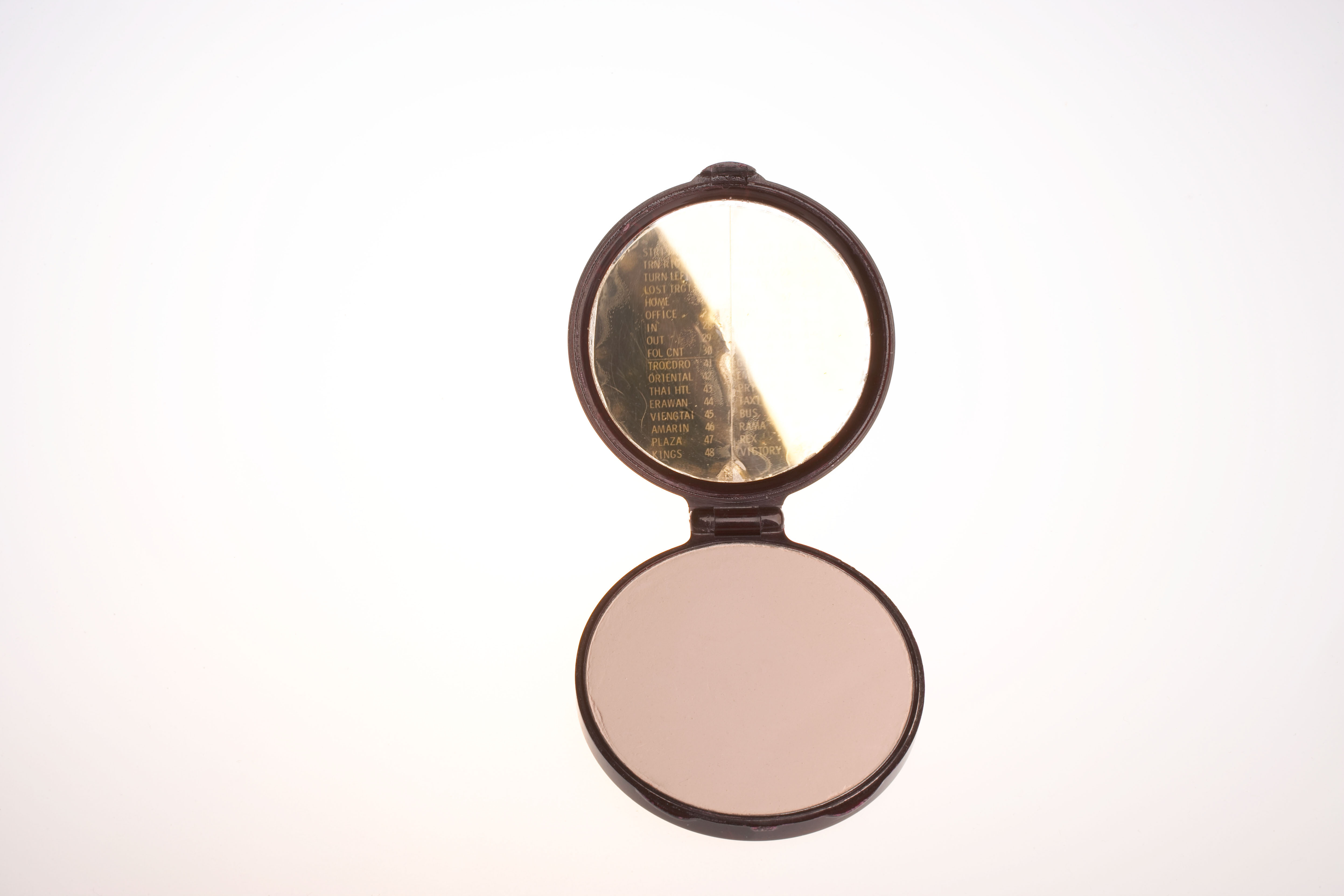
A modified compact containing coding on the mirror, designed to be used by CIA operatives – date of production unknown source: CIA

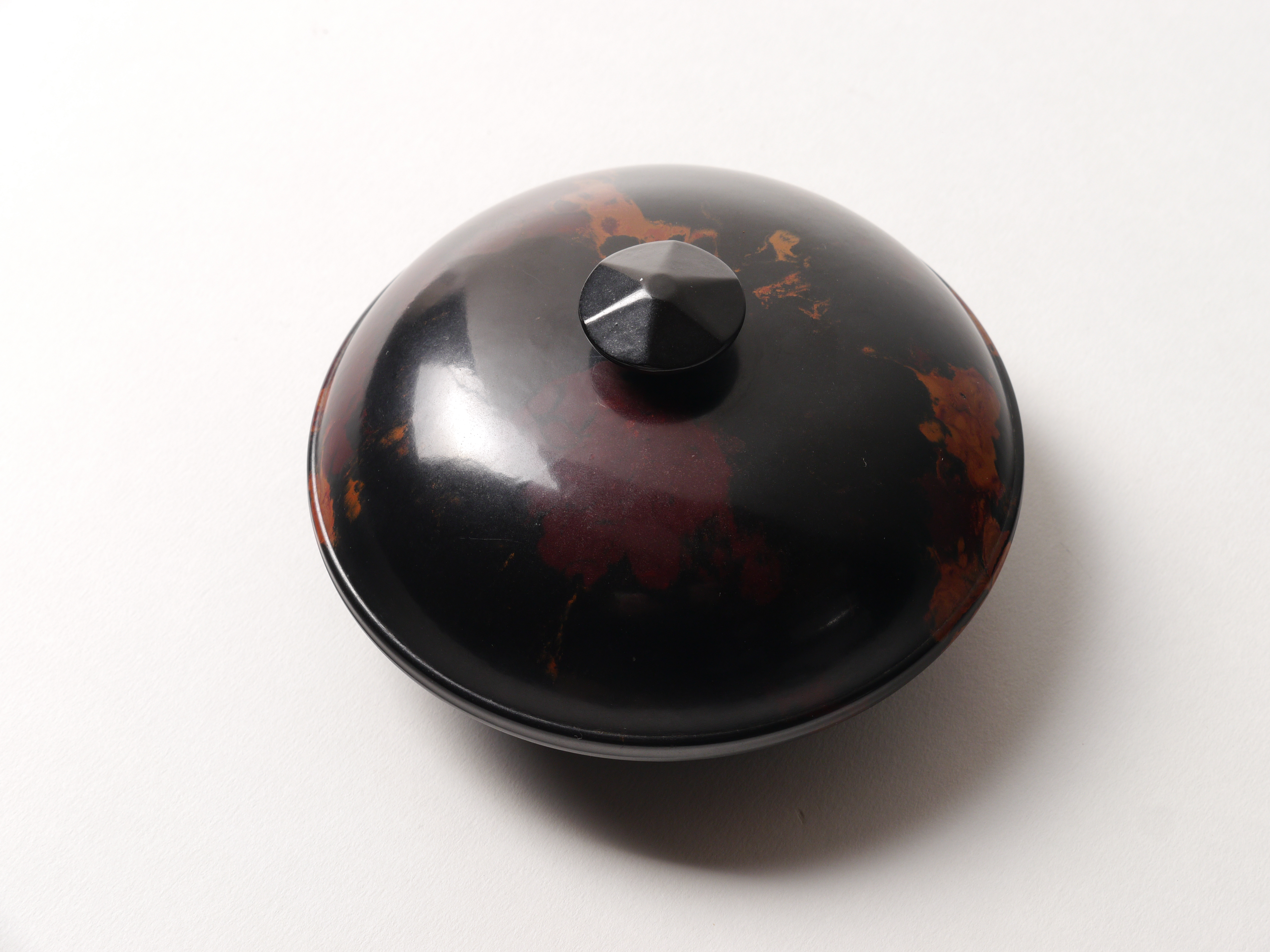
Powder box in bakelite, collection Museum of Industry Ghent.

A compact (also powder box, powder case and flapjack) is a cosmetic product. It is usually a small round metal case and contains two or more of the following: a mirror, pressed or loose face powder with a gauze sifter and a powder puff.

== History ==
Compacts date from the early 1900s, a time when make-up had not gained widespread social acceptance and the first powder cases were often concealed within accessories such as walking sticks, jewellery or hatpins.

From 1896, American handbag manufacturer Whiting & Davis created lidded compartments in its bags where powder rouge and combs could be stowed. In 1908, Sears' catalogue advertised a silver-plated case with mirror and powder puff (price 19 cents) and described it as small enough to fit in a handbag.

In the US, manufacturers such as Evans and Elgin American produced metal compacts with either finger chains or longer tango chains. Designed to be displayed rather than fitted in a handbag, they required more ornate designs and many from this era are examples of sleek Art Deco styling.

As make-up became more mainstream and women were increasingly active outside the home, compacts became more popular. British manufacturer Stratton began importing part-finished powder boxes from the US for assembly at its Birmingham plant in 1923 and by the 1930s it was creating them from scratch and producing half the compacts used by the UK cosmetics industry. The company developed self-opening inner lids in 1948, designed to protect the powder and prevent damage to fingernails, and by the 1960s it was exporting to agents worldwide.

=== Designs and variations ===
Compacts were heavily influenced by prevailing fashions – for instance, the 1922 discovery of Tutankhamun's tomb spawned Egypt-inspired obelisks, sphinxes and pyramids, while the growing popularity of the car meant compacts were incorporated into visors, steering wheels and gears. Jewellers such as Van Cleef & Arpels, Tiffany and Cartier began producing minaudières, metal evening bags/vanity cases carried on a metal or silk cord that contained a compact plus space for a few other small items. Many were inlaid with jewels or personalised.

By the 1930s, compacts were regularly updated to match the season's fashion trends and gimmicks such as watches and even miniature windscreen wipers were included in designs. Later, compacts became popular souvenir items. Souvenir powder cases were sold at both the 1933–1934 Chicago and 1939–1940 New York World's Fairs.

== Decline ==
Although compacts continued to be in widespread production up to the 1960s, their popularity diminished as the cosmetics industry created plastic containers that were designed to be discarded once the powder ran out. These began to be heavily advertised from the 1950s. Writing in Americana, Deirdre Clemente suggested that changing make-up trends, notably for natural rather than pale and powdered complexions from the late 1950s on, contributed to the declining popularity of the compact.
