= David Stratton (disambiguation) =

David Stratton (1939–2025) was an English-Australian film critic and television personality.

David Stratton may also refer to:

- David Straton (martyr), 16th century Scottish nobleman
- David Michael Stratton or Mike Stratton (1941–2020), American football player
- David Vincent Stratton (1884–1968), American industrial engineer
