= Stratton Lake =

Lake in the state of Minnesota, United States

- Location within Minnesota
- Location: Isanti County, Minnesota
- Coordinates: 45°26′N 93°15′W
- Type: lake

Stratton Lake is a lake in Isanti County, in the U.S. state of Minnesota.

Stratton Lake bears the name of a pioneer settler.

== See also ==
- List of lakes in Minnesota
