= Justice Stratton =

Justice Stratton may refer to:

- Evelyn Lundberg Stratton (born 1953), associate justice of the Supreme Court of Ohio
- Riley E. Stratton (1823–1866), associate justice of the Oregon Supreme Court
