= Straton =

Straton or Strato may refer to:

== People (mononym) ==
- Strato I, Indo-Greek king (reigned 125–110 BC)
- Strato II, Indo-Greek king (reigned 25 BC – 10 AD)
- Strato of Lampsacus (c. 335 – c. 269 BC), Greek philosopher
- Straton of Sardis, Greek poet and anthologist (c. 1st century AD)
- Abdashtart I (Straton I, reigned 365–352 BC), king of Sidon
- Straton of Alexandria, ancient Greek wrestler and pancratiast (fl. c. 68/64 BC)
- Straton of Alexandria, ancient Greek runner (fl. c. 77 AD)

== People (surname) ==
- Bogdan Straton (b. 1983), Romanian professional footballer
- Cătălin Straton (b. 1989), Romanian professional footballer
- Isabella Charlet-Straton (1838-1918), British female mountaineer
- John Roach Straton (1875–1929), American pastor
- Norman Dumenil John Straton (1840-1918), Anglican bishop
- Sarah Straton (b. 1970), Australian olympian: beach volleyball
- Taya Straton (1960–1996), Australian actress

== Fictional characters ==
- Straton of Stageira, a fictitious Greek philosopher invented for 2014 video game The Talos Principle
- Strato, character in Shakespeare's 1599 play Julius Caesar
- Straton, character in The Sacred Band of Stepsons novels (1985–2012)

== Science ==
- Strato is a Latin prefix meaning "layer," used in words like the Stratosphere layer of the Atmosphere of Earth, and the Stratus and Stratocumulus cloud types.

== Companies ==
- Strato AG, a German hosting provider

== See also ==
- Straton's Tower or Caesarea Maritima, a place in Israel
- Stratton (disambiguation)
