= Stratton, Virginia =

Unincorporated community in Virginia, United States

Coordinates: 37°05′16″N 82°21′38″W

Stratton is an unincorporated community in Dickenson County, Virginia, United States.

== History ==
A post office was established at Stratton in 1887, and remained in operation until it was discontinued in 1963. The community was named for Frank A. Stratton, a local entrepreneur.
