= Stratton (company) =

British manufacturer

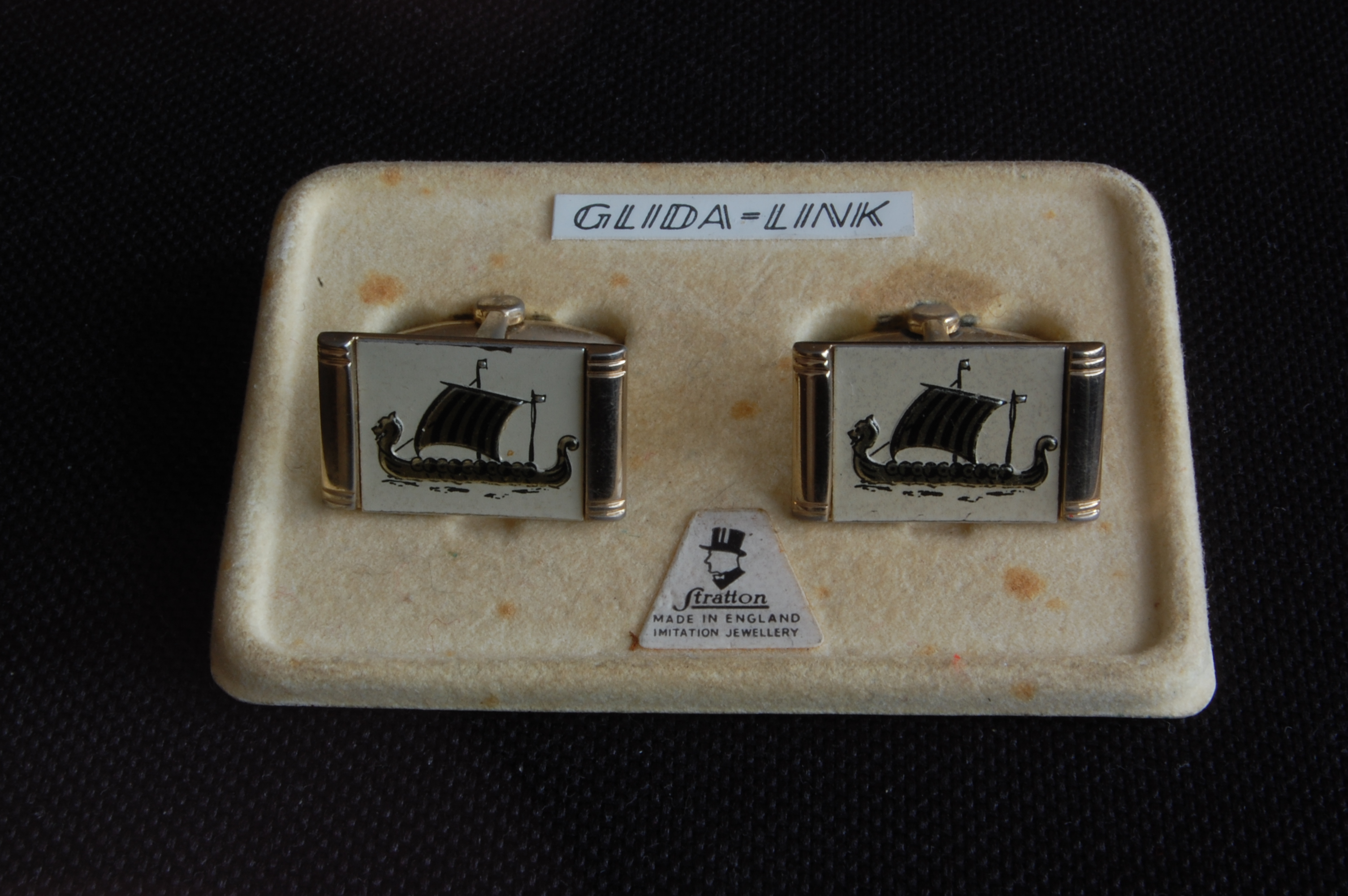
A pair of Stratton "Glide-link" cufflinks, in their original tray

Stratton is a brand of powder compacts, lipstick holders and other devices and containers for cosmetics, made in Birmingham, England. The company also made costume jewellery.

== Early days ==
The parent company was founded in 1860 (166 years ago) as Stratnoid, and initially made knitting needles. It changed its name to Stratton and in 1920 (106 years ago), merged with Jarrett and Rainsford, to form a company named Jarrett, Rainsford and Laughton Ltd., trading as Stratton and as Stratton of Mayfair.

In 1923, the company began assembling compacts, using components imported from the United States. In 1929, the company was headquartered at its Alexandra Works, Kent Street, Birmingham, with showrooms in Hamsell Street, Jewin Street, London, EC2.

By the early 1930s, it was making its own components in Birmingham, and producing half of all the compacts made in the United Kingdom.

== After World War II ==
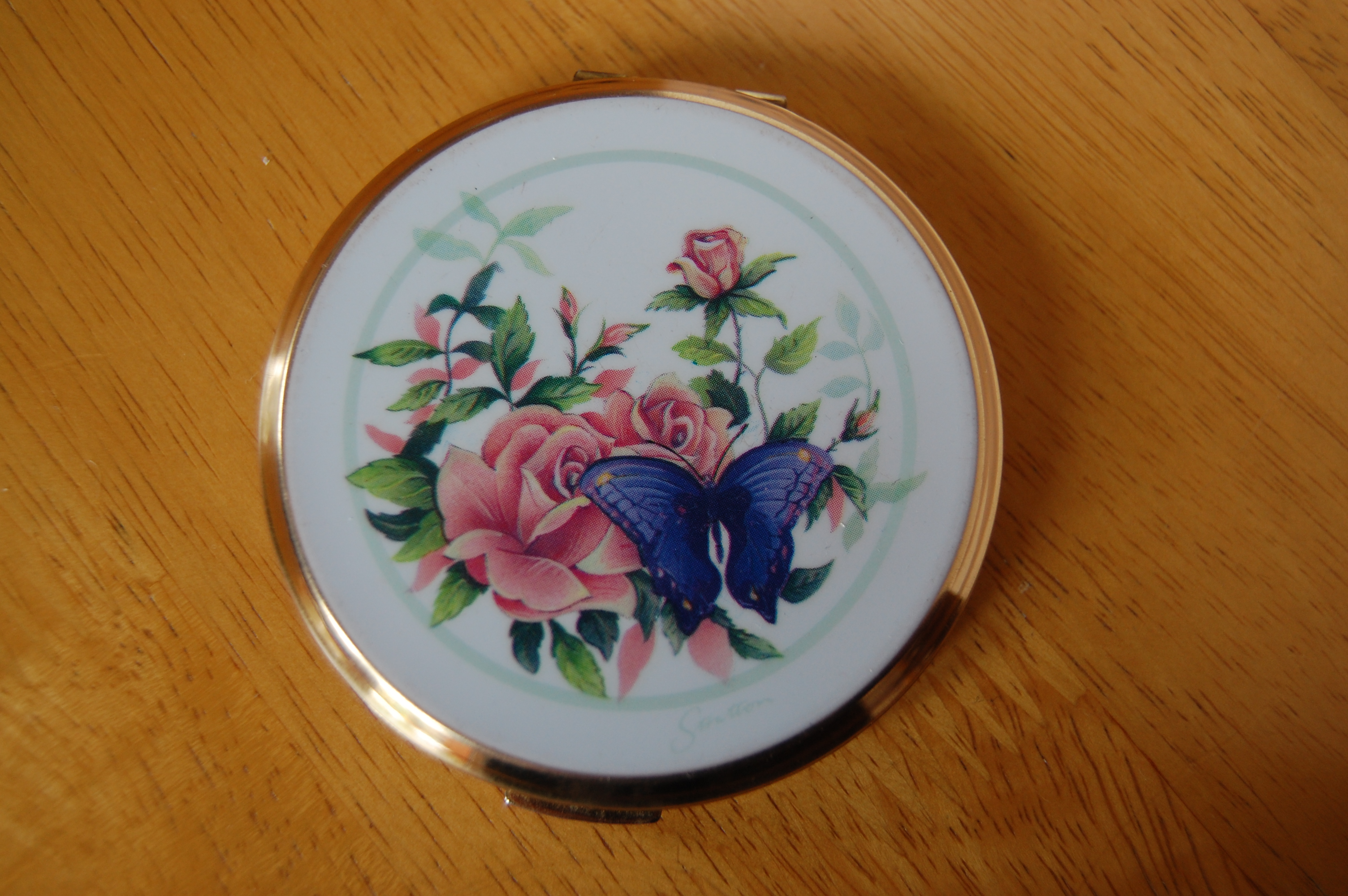
A post-1948 Stratton powder compact with transfer-printed lid

In November 1940, during World War II, four of its five Birmingham factories were lost to enemy bombing. The company recovered and diverted its work to producing war supplies. By 1947, the company was operating from the Leominster Works, Lower Essex Street, Birmingham, and had showrooms at Dean Street, London, W1. In 1948, the company patented a mechanism for a self-opening inner lid for compacts. During subsequent years, it acquired rivals including Kigu and Mascot. In the 1950s the company was producing compacts with drawings of dogs by K.F. Barker on the lids.

A new factory at Warstock Road, Birmingham, was acquired. The company changed hands several times before finally closing in 1997, but the name was revived subsequently and the company using it is still in operation, again assembling imported components.
