= Stratten =

Stratten is a toponymic surname of English origin, a variant of Stratton, which means "settlement on a Roman road". Notable people with the surname include:

- Dorothy Stratten (1960–1980), Canadian model and actress
- Merrily Stratten (born 1951), Canadian swimmer
- Mitch Stratten, British director, composer, writer and sculptor
- Ron Stratten (born 1943), American football coach
- Thomas P. Stratten (1904–?), South African engineer

== See also ==
- Frederick Stratten Russell (1897–1984), English marine biologist
