= W. K. Stratton (writer) =

American writer

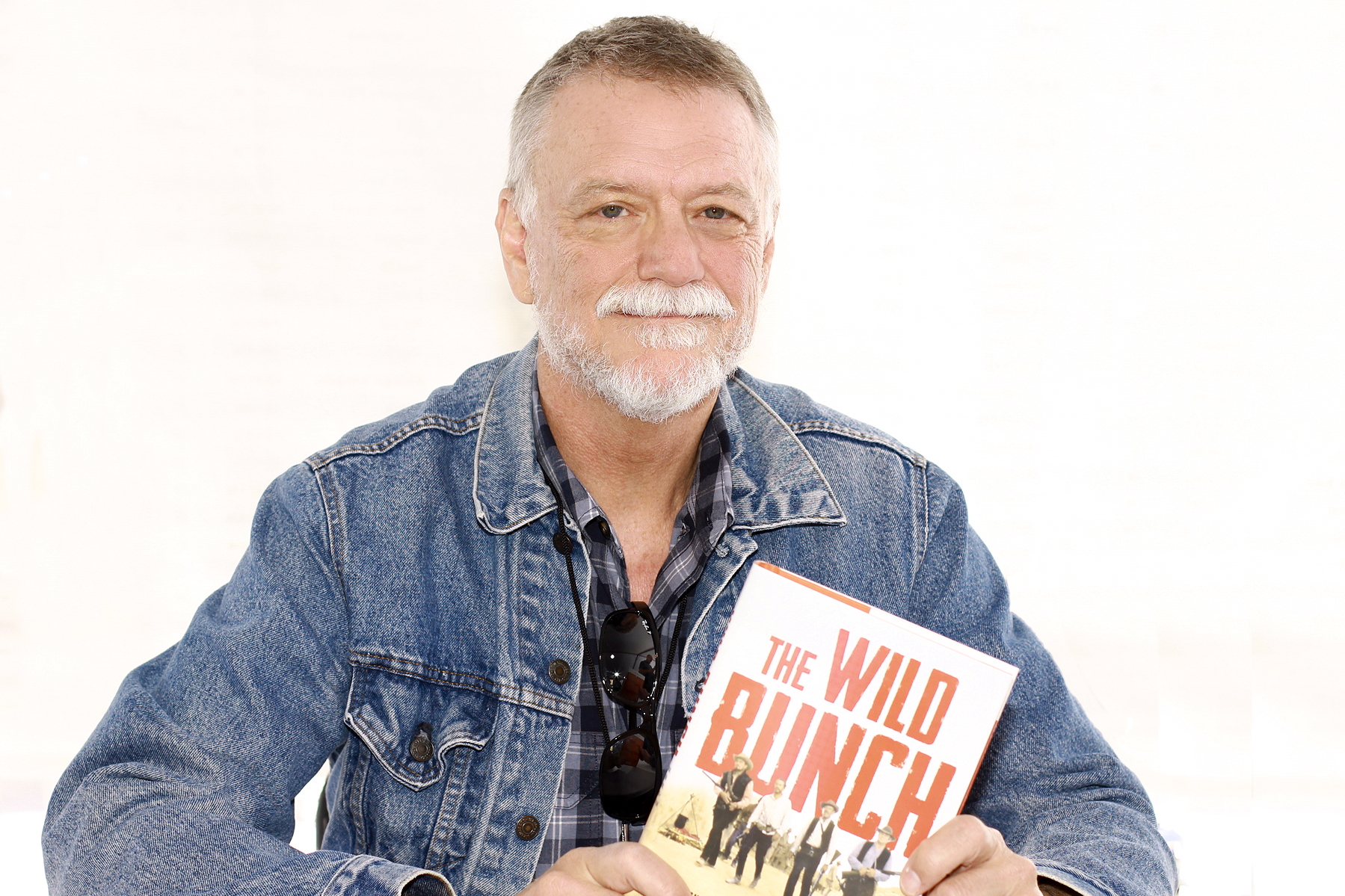
Stratton at the 2019 Texas Book Festival

William Kip "W.K." Stratton is an American writer, known for his historical non-fiction publications. Stratton lives in suburban Austin, Texas.

== Early life and career ==
A native of Guthrie, Oklahoma, he graduated from high school there and attended the nearby University of Central Oklahoma (at the time known as Central State University), where he took a B.A. in English and an M.A. in English, with an emphasis on Creative Studies; he wrote a novel for his thesis. To support himself through college, he worked as a newspaper reporter and editor on his hometown daily. He spent ten years as a newspaper journalist, including a stint on the Tulsa World.

He worked in politics as well, serving as Reading Clerk and as a press aide for the Oklahoma State Senate and was a voter education consultant for the Oklahoma State Election Board, which was affiliated with the State Senate. He also managed two political campaigns.

== Career as writer ==
In the late 1980s, he relocated to Central Texas. After successfully selling freelance articles to Sports Illustrated, Outside and other magazines, including a stint as a contributing editor for Oklahoma Today, he began a 15-year freelance affiliation with the Dallas Morning News, contributing criticism and occasionally columns and feature stories. He later was published in GQ Magazine.

To support his writing career, he worked at a variety of day-jobs, including as a college English instructor, trade magazine editor, and technical writer. Eventually he became a successful manager at an international high tech company, National Instruments, focusing on technical documentation and product localization.

In 2002, Crown Publishing Group, an imprint of Random House, published his first book, Backyard Brawl, which explored the University of Texas-Texas A&M University football rivalry while examining cultural evolution in modern Texas. Both historical and anecdotal, the book captures both the Texan love of football, and the context from which this love arises. Two years later, Harcourt published his memoir, Chasing the Rodeo, a multifaceted history of rodeo that also traces the life and origins of his runaway birth father, who was a rodeo cowboy in the 1950s and 60s.

In 2004, the University of Texas Press published Splendor in the Short Grass: A Grover Lewis Reader, the first comprehensive collection of the work of Texas cult writer Grover Lewis. In his mid-40s, Stratton began training earnestly as a white-collar boxer at R. Lord's Gym in Austin, and this would influence his future writing projects. In 2006, he received contracts for his next two books. The first, published by the University of Texas Press, was a collaboration with pioneering female boxer Anissa Zamarron dealing with her successful recovery from psychological problems and her subsequent winning of two world boxing titles. The book's title is Boxing Shadows.

The second project was a study of two-time world heavyweight boxing champion Floyd Patterson, titled Floyd Patterson: The Fighting Life of Boxing's Invisible Champion, published by Houghton Mifflin Harcourt, and shortlisted for the 2013 PEN/ESPN Award for Literary Sports Writing.

== Bibliography ==
Title	Published	Publisher
The Wild Bunch: Sam Peckinpah, a Revolution in Hollywood, and the Making of a Legendary Film	February 2019	Bloomsbury Publishing
Ranchero Ford/Dying in Red Dirt Country: Poetry	July 2015	Lamar University Press
Floyd Patterson: The Fighting Life of Boxing's Invisible Champion	July 2012	Houghton Mifflin Harcourt
Dreaming Sam Peckinpah: Poetry	September 2011	Ink Brush Press
Boxing Shadows: The story of the unlikely rise of Anissa Zamarron to the pinnacle of women's boxing	October 2009	University of Texas Press
Chasing the Rodeo: On Wild Rides and Big Dreams, Broken Hearts and Broken Bones, and One Man's Search for the West	May 2005	Harcourt
Splendor in the Short Grass: The Grover Lewis Reader	April 2005	University of Texas Press
Backyard Brawl: Inside the Blood Feud Between Texas and Texas A&M	September 2002	Crown
