= Stretton =

Stretton may refer to:

== People ==
- Stretton (surname)
- (Arthur) Stretton Reeve (1907-1981), English clergyman

== Places ==
=== England ===
Stretton means "settlement on a Roman Road" (from the Old English "stræt" and "tun"). Of the seventeen places in England, all but two are situated on a Roman road, the exceptions being Stretton Westwood and Stretton en le Field.

==== Cheshire ====
- Stretton, Cheshire West and Chester
  - Stretton Hall, Cheshire
  - Stretton Lower Hall
  - Stretton Old Hall
  - Stretton Watermill
- Stretton, Warrington
  - Lower Stretton
  - RNAS Stretton (HMS Blackcap)

==== Derbyshire ====
- Stretton, Derbyshire
  - Stretton railway station

==== Herefordshire ====
- Stretton Grandison
- Stretton Sugwas

==== Leicestershire ====
- Stretton en le Field
- Little Stretton, Leicestershire
  - Stretton Magna / Great Stretton
  - Stretton Hall, Leicestershire

==== Rutland ====
- Stretton, Rutland

==== Shropshire ====
- Stretton Westwood
- Church Stretton
  - All Stretton
  - All Stretton Halt railway station
  - Church Stretton railway station
  - Little Stretton, Shropshire
  - Little Stretton Halt railway station
- Stoney Stretton
  - Stretton Heath

==== Staffordshire ====
- Stretton, East Staffordshire
  - Stretton and Claymills railway station
- Stretton, South Staffordshire
  - Lapley, Stretton and Wheaton Aston
  - Stretton Aqueduct
  - Stretton Hall, Staffordshire

==== Warwickshire ====
- Stretton Baskerville
- Stretton-on-Dunsmore
- Stretton-on-Fosse
  - Stretton-on-Fosse railway station
- Stretton-under-Fosse

=== Australia ===
==== Queensland ====
The place in Australia is named after George Stretton, a 19th-century Englishman.

- Stretton, Queensland
  - Electoral district of Stretton

== Other uses ==
- 11626 Church Stretton (an asteroid)
- Stretton, a novel by Henry Kingsley

== See also ==
- Stratton (disambiguation)
- Stratten, surname
