= Nox, Shropshire =

Hamlet in Shropshire, England

Coordinates: 52.688°N 2.872°W

Nox
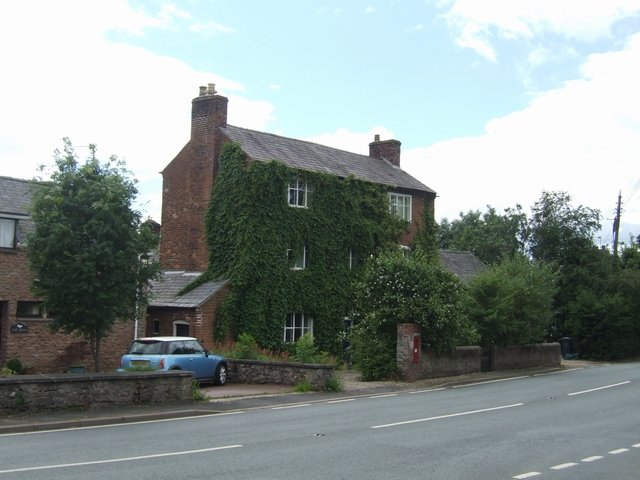
- A house in Nox

- Location within Shropshire
- Population: 22
- OS grid reference: SJ410104
- Civil parish: Westbury; Pontesbury
- Unitary authority: Shropshire
- Ceremonial county: Shropshire
- Region: West Midlands
- Country: England
- Sovereign state: United Kingdom
- Post town: SHREWSBURY
- Postcode district: SY5
- Dialling code: 01743
- Police: West Mercia
- Fire: Shropshire
- Ambulance: West Midlands
- UK Parliament: Shrewsbury and Atcham

Nox is a hamlet in Shropshire, England, around a staggered junction on the B4386 road (historically a Roman Road) between the small villages of Cruckton and Yockleton, and south of Ford.

Anciently in the parish of Pontesbury, Nox now lies mostly in the civil parish of Westbury; the parish boundaries of Westbury and of Pontesbury, which contains four of its houses, run through the hamlet.

It is named after the Nock family, who owned what is now known as Nox House. It was initially recorded as an alehouse held by Richard Nock in 1653, that was later known as 'The Star and Ball' and was a regular meeting place of the Ford manorial court from 1674 to 1811. It was a butcher's shop in the 19th century before conversion to a private house. Nox also had a smithy, erected by John Nock in c.1668, that was 'still in business' in 1968.
