= Little Stretton =

Little Stretton may refer to:

== Places ==
=== England ===
Stretton means "settlement on a Roman Road" (from the Old English stræt and tun).

- Little Stretton, Leicestershire - a small village and parish
- Little Stretton, Shropshire - a village and former parish
