= Stoney Stretton =

Coordinates: 52.680°N 2.913°W

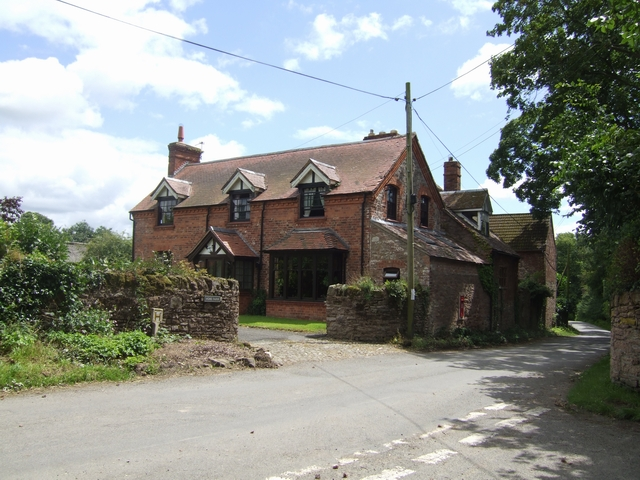
- Home Farm, Stoney Stretton

- Location within Shropshire
- OS grid reference: SJ382095
- Civil parish: Westbury
- Unitary authority: Shropshire
- Ceremonial county: Shropshire
- Region: West Midlands
- Country: England
- Sovereign state: United Kingdom
- Post town: SHREWSBURY
- Postcode district: SY5
- Dialling code: 01743
- Police: West Mercia
- Fire: Shropshire
- Ambulance: West Midlands
- UK Parliament: Shrewsbury and Atcham

Stoney Stretton is a hamlet in Shropshire, England, west of Shrewsbury. It is situated just off the B4386 road (a Roman Road, hence the settlement's name "Stretton") between the villages of Yockleton and Westbury. It lies in the civil parish of Westbury. To the northwest, by the Shrewsbury to Welshpool railway, is the dispersed hamlet of Stretton Heath.

== See also ==
- Listed buildings in Westbury, Shropshire
