= Listed buildings in Westbury, Shropshire =

Westbury is a civil parish in Shropshire, England. It contains 55 listed buildings that are recorded in the National Heritage List for England. Of these, five are listed at Grade II*, the middle of the three grades, and the others are at Grade II, the lowest grade. The parish contains the villages of Westbury, Stoney Stretton and Yockleton, and smaller settlements, and is otherwise rural. Most of the listed buildings are houses and associated structures, cottages, farmhouses and farm buildings, the earliest of which are timber framed or have timber-framed cores. The other listed buildings include two churches, items in a churchyard, a country house and associated structures, and a watermill.

== Key ==
Grade	Criteria
II*	Particularly important buildings of more than special interest
II	Buildings of national importance and special interest

== Buildings ==
Name and location	Photograph	Date	Notes	Grade
St Mary's Church, Westbury; 52.67873°N 2.95480°W		13th century	The oldest part of the church is the nave, the north aisle dates from the following century, the tower was built in 1753, and much of the body of the church was reconstructed in 1887. The body of the church is built in red sandstone, the tower in grey-yellow sandstone, and the roofs are tiled. The church consists of a nave, a north aisle with a north door, a chancel with a north vestry, and a west tower. The tower has three stages, and contains a rectangular doorway with a rusticated surround, over which is a Venetian window, an oculus, clock faces, round-headed rusticated bell openings, a coped parapet ramped up at the angles, and a slated pyramidal cap with a weathervane.	II*
Manor Farmhouse; 52.67959°N 2.91538°W	—	Mid to late 15th century	The farmhouse was altered in about 1600, and in the 19th century. It is timber framed with cruck construction and is rendered, partly rebuilt in painted brick, and has a slate roof. There is one storey and an attic, a hall range, a projecting cross-wing, and a lean-to on the right. On the front is a gabled porch, the windows are casements, some with segmental heads, and there are two gabled eaves dormers. Inside are three full cruck trusses.	II*
Former Lower House Farmhouse; 52.67815°N 2.95230°W		c. 1500	A farmhouse, later a private house, that was extended in the 16th and 17th centuries, a cross-wing was added in the 18th century, and there was partial refacing or rebuilding in the 19th century. The earlier parts are timber framed with brick infill on a stone plinth, and partly refaced or rebuilt in sandstone and red brick. The 18th-century extension is in yellow sandstone. The older parts face Shrewsbury Road, they have one storey and attics, the ground floor is in sandstone and the attics in brick, and there are three gabled bays. In the middle bay is a porch with a gabled hood. The 18th-century wing faces Station Road, and has two storeys and an attic, three bays, a central doorway, and two gabled dormers. The roofs are tiled and the windows are casements.	II
The Green Farmhouse; 52.70063°N 3.01387°W	—	15th or 16th century	The farmhouse was altered and extended in about 1600 and again in the 19th and 20th centuries. The original part is timber framed with cruck construction, rebuilding is in rendered stone, the extensions are in red brick, and the roof is slated. There is one storey and an attic, a range of three bays, and a rear extension. The windows are casements, there are gabled eaves dormers, and inside are at least two full cruck trusses.	II
Marche Manor; 52.68779°N 2.98607°W	—	Mid to late 16th century	A farmhouse that was extended in 1604 and later in the 17th century, and restored in the 1890s. It is timber framed with plastered infill on a plinth of sandstone and red brick, and has a tile roof. There are two storeys and an attic, and it consists of a two-bay hall range, a projecting gabled three-bay cross-wing on the left added in 1604, and a cross-wing on the right added in the 19th century. The upper storeys and gables are jettied with moulded bressumers on carved brackets. The windows are 19th-century mullioned and transomed with casements and lattice glazing. In the hall range is an inglenook fireplace.	II*
Middle Farmhouse; 52.65653°N 2.94159°W	—	Mid to late 16th century	The farmhouse was partly rebuilt in the 19th century. It is timber framed with painted brick infill, partly rebuilt in painted brick, and has a slate roof. There is one storey and an attic, three bays, and a rear extension. On the front is a gabled brick porch with a segmental arch, and the windows are casements, and there are three gabled eaves dormers.	II
Lower Farmhouse, Vennington; 52.68018°N 2.97843°W		Late 16th century	The farmhouse was altered and extended in the 17th and 19th centuries. It is in rendered timber framing, partly rebuilt and extended in sandstone and brick, and has a slate roof. There are two storeys, and it consists of two bays on a plinth on the left, a projecting gabled bay, and a later extension to the right. The gabled bay has a jettied upper storey, and a jettied gable with shaped brackets and moulded bargeboards. The windows in the extension are mullioned and transomed, and in the rest of the house they are casements.	II
Lower Farmhouse, Westley; 52.65609°N 2.94162°W	—	c. 1600	The farmhouse was extended in the 17th century and restored in the late 20th century. It is timber framed with lath and plaster infill on a plinth of brick and concrete, the rear wing is partly rebuilt in brick, and the roof is tiled. There are two storeys and an L-shaped plan, with a front range of two bays, and a two-bay rear wing. On the front is a lean-to porch, and the windows are casements.	II
Wigley Farmhouse; 52.66894°N 2.92676°W	—	c. 1600 (probable)	The farmhouse is in red brick, the right gable end is in stone, the left gable end is rendered, and the roof is tiled. There is one storey and an attic, and a T-shaped plan, with a main range of four bays, a two-bay wing, and a rear lean-to extension. The windows include casements, canted bay windows, and two gabled dormers.	II
Lower Trefnant Farmhouse; 52.68737°N 3.02130°W	—	Late 16th or early 17th century	The farmhouse was altered in the 17th and 18th centuries and remodelled in the 20th century. It has a timber framed core, and is in red brick with a dentilled eaves cornice, and a slate roof. There are two storeys, an attic and a basement, and a T-shaped plan, with a main range, a gabled projecting cross-wing, and a lean-to infill in the angle. On the front is a gabled porch, most of the windows are casements, and there are some cross windows. Inside are timber framed walls.	II
Hargreaves Farmhouse; 52.68631°N 3.00848°W	—	Early 17th century (probable)	The farmhouse was altered and extended in the 19th century. It is in rendered timber framing on a sandstone plinth, with plastered and red brick infill, an extension in sandstone, and slate roofs. There are two storeys, and it consists of a hall range of eleven bays, a projecting gabled three-bay cross wing at the northwest, a projecting two-storey porch at the southwest, and a kitchen wing at the rear. The hall range is jettied on three sides, and the porch has a jettied upper storey with a moulded bressumer. The windows are casements.	II*
Winnington Hall; 52.68704°N 3.01996°W	—	Early 17th century (probable)	A farmhouse that was altered in the 18th century and remodelled in 1849, it is in red brick on a timber framed core, with dentilled eaves cornices and slate roofs. It has an H-shaped plan, consisting of a three-bay hall range with two storeys, and cross-wings with two storeys and attics. On the front is a gabled porch with a depressed chamfered arch and a datestone, and the windows are casements with segmental heads.	II
Hall Mill Farmhouse; 52.69129°N 3.00994°W	—	Mid 17th century	The farmhouse, which was later extended and altered, is in red brick with a timber framed core, it is rendered at the rear, and has a tile roof. There are two storeys and an attic, and an L-shaped plan, consisting of a two-bay range and later extensions. In the centre is a gabled timber framed porch, and the windows are casements, some with segmental heads.	II
Barn and cart shed, Hall Mill Farm; 52.69070°N 3.00980°W	—	Mid 17th century	The barn and cart shed are timber framed with weatherboarding on a sandstone plinth, the right gable end is rebuilt in red brick, and the roof is tiled. The barn has three bays, and the cart shed to the left has one bay. The barn contains a pair of doors and three left doors.	II
Lower House Farmhouse; 52.68103°N 2.91156°W	—	Mid 17th century	The farmhouse was extended and altered in the 19th century. It is timber framed with red brick infill on a brick plinth, partly rebuilt and extended in red brick, and it has a tile roof. There is a hall range with two storeys and a dentilled eaves cornice, a cross-wing with one storey and an attic, a single-storey lean-to on the right, and a gabled rear wing. The porch is in the angle, and the windows are casements.	II
The Cop; 52.68573°N 2.89043°W	—	Mid 17th century	A farmhouse, later divided into two dwellings, with later extensions, it is timber framed on a plinth of Alberbury breccia and red brick, with infill and extensions in red brick, and slate roofs. The house has an L-shaped plan, it is partly in two storeys and partly in one storey with an attic, and consists of a two-bay range, and a cross-wing of 1½ bays, and further extensions to the right and the rear. The windows are casements, and there are gabled eaves dormers.	II
The Lynches; 52.68832°N 2.87470°W	—	Mid 17th century (probable)	A farmhouse that was remodelled in about 1735, and partly rebuilt in the 19th century. It is in red brick with sandstone dressings on a sandstone plinth, with a timber framed core, corner ashlar pilaster strips, and a hipped tile roof. There are two storeys, an attic and a basement, a main block of three bays, and a rear wing. On the front is a gabled porch, and most of the windows are sashes, some with segmental heads and triple keystones.	II
House east of Yew Tree Farm; 52.67756°N 2.92157°W	—	17th century	The house is timber framed, partly with brick infill, partly with weatherboarding, and partly rebuilt in brick, and the roof is in corrugated iron. There are two storeys, three bays, and a rear lean-to. On the front are two doorways.	II
The Porch House; 52.68021°N 2.97986°W	—	1664	The house, later divided into two dwellings, is timber framed with painted brick infill on a stone plinth, and with a tile roof. There is one storey and an attic, and a T-shaped plan, with two bays flanking a central two-storey gabled porch. To the left is a smaller, single-storey porch, the windows are casements, and there is a gabled eaves dormer.	II
The White House; 52.68557°N 2.88954°W		Mid to late 17th century	The house was later altered and extended. It is timber framed with cruck construction, and has painted brick and rendered infill, it is partly rebuilt and extended in painted brick, and has slate roofs. There is one storey and an attic, and an L-shaped plan, with a range of two bays, a one-bay cross-wing, and later rear extensions. The windows are casements with diamond glazing, there are gabled eaves dormers, and inside is a full cruck truss.	II
Lower Wallop Farmhouse and Cottage; 52.66198°N 3.00030°W	—	c. 1670	A farmhouse, later two dwellings, it was extended in about 1812, and partly rebuilt later in the 19th century. It is in rendered timber framing with red brick infill, partly rebuilt in red brick, the extension is in sandstone with some red brick facing, and it has a slate roof, hipped over the extension. There are two storeys, the main block has a southeast front with three bays, the middle bay projecting under a triangular pedimented gable, and there is a rear wing, a gabled staircase tower, and a kitchen block in the angle. The central doorway has an architrave, reeded pilaster strips, reeded console brackets with guttae, and a flat hood. The windows are sashes with slightly segmental heads.	II
3 Vennington Road; 52.67850°N 2.95943°W	—	Late 17th century	A timber framed cottage with rendered infill on a stone plinth, the left wall is in stone, other walls are partly rebuilt in stone, and the roof is slated. There is one storey and an attic, two bays, a lean-to on the front on the left with a tile roof, and another lean-to on the right. The windows are casements.	II
Dovecote, Lower Newton Farm; 52.67095°N 2.91240°W	—	Late 17th century (probable)	The dovecote is in red brick with a dentilled eaves cornice, and a tile roof with crow-stepped gables. The is one storey and a loft. In the south gable end is a blocked circular opening and a segmental-headed doorway beneath, and in the east front is a loft opening.	II
Field barn, Lower Trefnant Farm; 52.68948°N 3.02096°W	—	Late 17th century	The barn is timber framed with red brick infill on a red brick plinth and has a corrugated iron roof. There are two bays, and the barn contains loft openings in the gable ends.	II
Former dovecote, Marche Manor; 52.68777°N 2.98634°W	—	17th or 18th century (probable)	The dovecote, which was altered in the 19th century, is in sandstone, and has a pyramidal tile roof and a weathervane. There is a circular plan and one storey. It contains doorways and square windows, and is linked to the house by a covered way.	II
Whitton Hall; 52.67566°N 2.96905°W		c. 1720–30	A country house, restored and extended in about 1920. It is in red brick with grey sandstone dressings, floor bands, a moulded eaves cornice, and slate roofs with coped parapeted gables and moulded kneelers. There are two storeys and an attic, and a shallow U-shaped plan, with a front of nine bays and three gables. The fourth bay projects slightly and has an open triangular pediment with shaped brackets, and a round-arched window in the tympanum. In the ground floor is a doorway with an architrave, a frieze and a triangular pediment. The windows are sashes with triple keystones. The rear front has seven bays, the middle bay slightly projecting under a balustraded parapet. The gabled service wing of 1920 at the rear has three storeys.	II*
Brook Cottage; 52.67881°N 2.95709°W	—	Early 18th century (probable)	The cottage is in painted sandstone with a slate roof. There are two storeys, two bays, and a one-storey lean-to on the left. The windows are casements, on the right return is a gabled porch, and in the left return is a doorway with a gabled hood.	II
Barn, Whitton Hall; 52.67528°N 2.96968°W	—	Early 18th century	The barn, which re-uses earlier materials, is timber framed with weatherboarding and some red brick infill on a brick plinth, and has a tile roof. There are three bays, and the barn contains doorways and loft doors.	II
Dovecote, Whitton Hall; 52.67550°N 2.96932°W	—	Early 18th century	The dovecote is in red brick on a chamfered plinth, and has a dentilled band, a dentilled eaves cornice, and a conical slate roof with a finial. There is a circular plan, and the dovecote contains a segmental-headed doorway, a higher segmental-headed opening, and two round-arched dormers. Inside are about 520 nest holes with ledges, and a central potence with three projecting arms.	II
Forecourt wall, Whitton Hall; 52.67532°N 2.96888°W	—	Early 18th century	The wall is in red brick with sandstone coping, and is about 30 metres (98 ft) long and 1 metre (3 ft 3 in) high. It contains square end and intermediate piers, and is ramped up to the end piers. At each end are square wooden gate posts with chamfered corners and moulded tops.	II
Service block and walls, Whitton Hall; 52.67554°N 2.96866°W	—	Early 18th century	The service block, later used for other purposes, is in red brick with a dentilled eaves cornice, and a slate roof with parapeted gable ends. There are two storeys and an attic, and six bays. The doorways and windows, which are casements, have segmental heads. To the left is a curved wall linking the service block to the hall. This is in red brick with stone quoins and coping with a door to the right. By the right corner are two square gate posts with chamfered corners and moulded tops, and a stone mounting block.	II
Barn, Wigley Farm; 52.66913°N 2.92613°W	—	18th century	The barn is in red brick, and has a tile roof with raised stepped verges to the gables. It contains a cart entry, a loft door, a window and narrow ventilation slits.	II
Stable block and coach house, Whitton Hall; 52.67535°N 2.96924°W	—	c. 1756	The stable block and coach house incorporate earlier material. They are in red brick on a timber framed core, with a dentilled eaves cornice, and a tile roof with parapeted gable ends. There is one two storey and an attic, and five bays. In the centre of the roof is an octagonal wooden cupola that has round-arched openings with impost blocks and keystones, a large square base, and an ogee lead cap with a wrought iron weathervane. The building contains various doorways and windows, and attached to the right is a stone mounting block.	II
Barn and cowhouse north of Lower House Farmhouse; 52.67852°N 2.95203°W	—	Mid to late 18th century (probable)	The barn is timber framed, and clad with weatherboarding and corrugated iron, on a red brick plinth, and has a corrugated iron roof. There are three bays, and it contains a doorway and a casement window. The cowhouse to the right is in sandstone with brick dressings and a slate roof. There are two storeys, a dentilled eaves cornice, and various doorways and windows.	II
Stables northeast of Lower House Farmhouse; 52.67830°N 2.95196°W	—	Mid to late 18th century (probable)	The stable is in sandstone with brick dressings and a tile roof. There are two storeys, on the front are inserted windows, and at the rear are loft doors, and doorways and a casement window with segmental heads.	II
Vennington Farmhouse; 52.68048°N 2.97879°W	—	Mid to late 18th century	The farmhouse incorporates a 17th-century core, probably timber framed, and it was extended in the 19th century. The farmhouse is in red brick with a dentilled eaves cornice, the extension is in sandstone with red brick dressings, and the roof is slated. There are two storeys and an attic, and an L-shaped plan, with a main range of four bays, a gabled rear wing, and a single-storey lean-to on the left. On the front is a gabled porch, and the windows are casements, those in the lower floors with segmental heads.	II
Grange Farmhouse, Whitton; 52.66883°N 2.98194°W	—	Late 18th century	The farmhouse incorporates earlier material, and was altered and extended in the 19th century. It has a timber framed core, and is partly in red brick on a sandstone plinth, and partly in grey sandstone with red brick dressings, it is partly rendered, and has a tile roof. There are three storeys and a basement, and a T-shaped plan with four bays, and a rear wing with one storey and an attic. On the front is a gabled porch with a segmental archway, and the windows are casements, most with segmental heads. On the rear wing is a gabled eaves dormer.	II
Sundial, St Mary's Church, Westbury; 52.67859°N 2.95484°W	—	1776	The sundial in the churchyard is in grey sandstone. It has three square steps, the top step moulded, a baluster with gadrooned lower parts, and a square top with an inscribed copper dial plate and a gnomon with a scrolled support.	II
Chest tomb 52.67846°N 2.95456°W	—	c. 1800	The chest tomb is in the churchyard of St Mary's Church, it is in grey sandstone, and has a double-width plan. The tomb has a chamfered plinth, fluted square corner piers, recessed oval side panels, and a chamfered top with reeded edges. The inscription is illegible.	II
Hall Farmhouse; 52.67752°N 2.95361°W	—	c. 1800	The farmhouse is in yellow sandstone, the southeast front is in red brick, the southwest front is rendered, it is on a plinth, and has a hipped slate roof. There are three storeys, three bays, and a single-storey bay recessed to the right. In the centre is a timber framed porch with lattice sides and a hipped roof, and the doorway has a rectangular fanlight. The windows are casements, some with segmental heads.	II
Home Farmhouse; 52.65654°N 2.94269°W	—	Late 18th or early 19th century	The farmhouse, which probably has an earlier core, is in red brick with a dentilled eaves cornice, and a slate roof. There are three storeys, a range of three bays, a two-storey wing on the left, and a single-storey lean-to. Most of the doorways and the windows, which are casements, have segmental heads.	II
Cause Castle Farmhouse; 52.66601°N 2.97844°W	—	Soon after 1810	The farmhouse is rendered, probably over sandstone, with deep eaves and a slate roof. There are two stages and an attic, and a front of four bays, the middle and outer bays projecting under triangular-pedimented gables, and a rendered lower brick rear wing. On the front is a three-bay cast iron porch with circular columns and a wrought iron balustrade, and the windows are sashes.	II
The Old Rectory, Westbury; 52.67804°N 2.95511°W	—	c. 1820	The rectory, later a private house, is stuccoed on a plinth, with deep eaves and a hipped slate roof. There are two storeys, three bays, and a recessed three-bay service wing on the right. On the front is a porch that has square piers with moulded capitals, a frieze and a cornice, and the doorway has a moulded architrave. This is flanked by canted bay windows, and in the upper floor are sash windows. The garden front has a semi-octagonal bay window, and a verandah with a tented lead canopy.	II
Former Coach house, Caus Castle Farm; 52.66587°N 2.97821°W	—	Early 19th century	The coach house, now used for other purposes, is in sandstone with a slate roof. There is one storey and a loft, and it contains various doorways and windows. On the right gable end a flight of nine stone steps leads up to a segmental-headed loft door.	II
Grange Farmhouse, Westbury; 52.67803°N 2.95719°W	—	Early 19th century	The farmhouse, which possibly incorporates earlier material, was extended later in the 19th century. The early part is in painted brick with a rendered left end wall, the extension is in red brick and yellow sandstone, and the roof is tiled. It partly has two storeys, and partly one storey and an attic. There is a moulded eaves cornice, four bays, and two parallel gabled wings at the rear. On the front is a Gothic cast iron porch with quatrefoil decoration, an interlacing frieze, and a moulded cornice. The doorway has panelled pilasters, panelled reveals and soffits, a reeded impost band, and a radial fanlight. The windows are sashes, and at the gable end of one of the windows is a dovecote.	II
Lower Winnington Farmhouse, walls and railings 52.69163°N 3.01708°W	—	Early 19th century	A red brick farmhouse on a stone plinth at the rear, and with a slate roof. There are two storeys and an L-shaped plan, with a three-bay range and later rear extensions. In the centre is a cast iron Gothic porch with quatrefoil-decorated panels, an intersecting Gothic frieze, and a moulded cornice, and a doorway with a reeded architrave, imposts, a fanlight with intersecting Gothic tracery, and a keystone. The windows are sashes. To the south are red brick garden walls with stone dressings, square piers with finials, cast iron railings, and a central gate.	II
Nox House and stables 52.68800°N 2.87235°W	—	Early 19th century	An alehouse, later a shop, then a private house, it probably incorporates earlier material. The house is in red brick with a dentilled eaves cornice and a slate roof. There are three storeys and three bays. The central doorway has a rectangular fanlight and a flat hood, and the windows are casements, those in the lower two floors with segmental heads. Attached to the right is a timber framed stable with red brick infill and a slate roof. In the ground floor is a wide entrance, and there is a door to the eaves.	II
Yockleton Mill and Cottage; 52.68761°N 2.88232°W	—	Early 19th century	The watermill and miller's cottage are in stone with brick dentilled eaves and slate roofs. The mill has three storeys and a rectangular plan, with small segmental-arched windows. The attached cottage has an L-shaped plan with a two-bay range and a gabled wing on the right. It contains a doorway and casement windows with segmental heads.	II
Stoney Stretton Hall; 52.68052°N 2.91372°W	—	Soon after 1831	The house has a core dating from about 1675. It is in stuccoed brick on a chamfered grey sandstone plinth, with deep eaves and a slate roof, hipped at the rear. There are three storeys and an irregular T-shaped plan, with a main range of three bays, and a rear wing with fronts of two bays. In the centre is a stone Tuscan porch with paired columns, an entablature and a blocking course, and a doorway with a rectangular fanlight. In the rear wing is a former 17th-century doorway with Ionic half-columns, a section of a frieze, a cornice and a broken triangular pediment. At the rear is a canted bay window.	II
Upper House Farmhouse; 52.68472°N 2.89156°W	—	Early to mid 19th century	The farmhouse has a late 16th-century timber framed core with probable cruck construction. It is in red brick with a dentilled eaves cornice, and a tile roof. There are two storeys and an attic, and three bays. On the front is a gabled timber framed porch, and the doorway has fluted pilasters strips, a rectangular fanlight, a frieze, and a dentilled cornice. The windows are casements with segmental heads.	II
The Grange, Yockleton; 52.68548°N 2.89529°W	—	1859	A rectory, later used for other purposes, it is in High Victorian Gothic style, and built in red brick with dressings in yellow sandstone, decoration in blue and yellow brick, and a banded tile roof with ridge tiles.	II
Holy Trinity Church, Yockleton; 52.68509°N 2.89571°W		1861	The church, designed by Edward Haycock, junior, is built in pink Alberbury breccia, with dressings in red and grey Grinshill sandstone, and a tile roof. The church consists of a nave with a clerestory, a lean-to south aisle, a chancel with a south aisle and a north vestry, and a southwest steeple. The steeple has a tower with clasped buttresses, a south door with a polychrome voussoirs, and a broach spire with lucarnes.	II
Pump to north of 5 and 6 Vennington; 52.68030°N 2.97984°W	—	Mid to late 19th century	The pump is in painted cast iron. It has a circular shaft with moulded rings, a fluted top with a splayed spout and a curved handle, and a fluted domed cap.	II
Pump, Grange Farm; 52.67798°N 2.95728°W	—	Mid to late 19th century	The pump is in painted cast iron. It has a circular shaft with moulded rings, a fluted top with a splayed spout and a curved handle, and a fluted domed cap.	II
Sundial, Whitton Hall; 52.67550°N 2.96900°W	—	Late 19th century (probable)	The sundial in the grounds of the hall is in yellow sandstone. It stands on two circular steps, and consists of a baluster with a circular section, and a moulded base and top, and has a copper dial plate and gnomon.	II
