= Green Bicycle Case =

1919 unsolved English homicide case

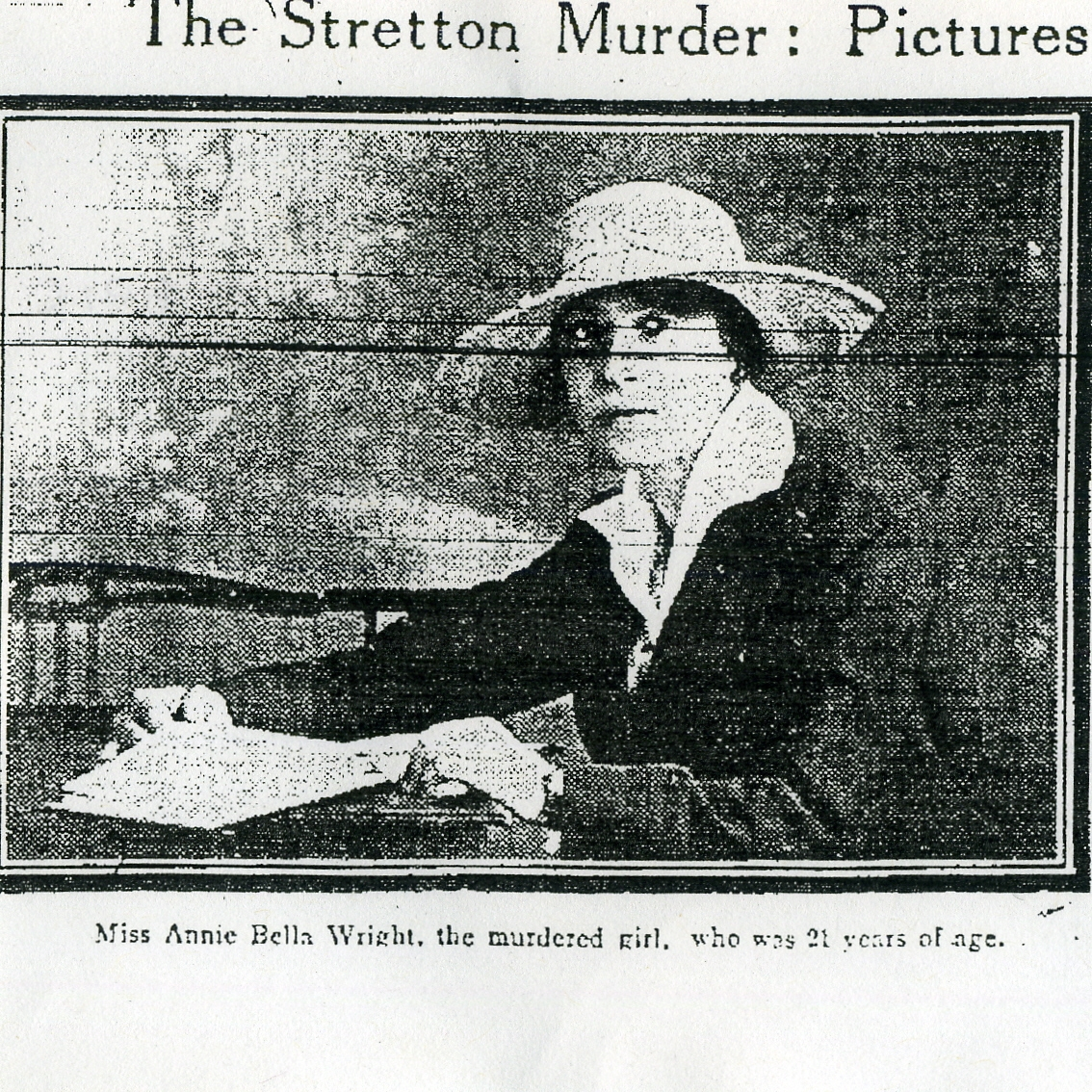
The victim, Annie Bella Wright, seen here in a newspaper article published shortly after her murder

Locations
1 Initial meeting of Wright and Light heading east.
2 Gaulby where they stopped at Wright's uncle Measures' cottage.
3 Gaulby Lane - Wright parted company heading south according to Light heading west.
4 Gartree Road - Wright's body was found with a bullet 5m away.

The Green Bicycle Case was a British murder investigation and subsequent trial pertaining to the fatal shooting of Bella Wright near the village of Little Stretton, Leicestershire, England, on 5 July 1919. Wright was killed by a single bullet wound to the face. The case takes its name from the fact that on the evening of her death, Wright had been seen cycling in the company of a man riding a green bicycle.

Ronald Light, a 33-year-old mathematics teacher, was the prime suspect in Wright's alleged murder. Light did not respond to an extensive media appeal to trace a man matching his description seen on the green bicycle, and concealed his bicycle and revolver holster in a canal following Wright's death. Upon his arrest, Light initially denied, then admitted to being in the company of Wright shortly before her death, although he consistently denied killing her. He was defended in court by Sir Edward Marshall Hall KC, who largely based his defence on the lack of a motive for Wright's death. Marshall Hall obtained Light's acquittal.

The case would prove to be one of the UK's most celebrated and controversial murder cases of the 20th century, with opinions varying among authors as to Light's guilt, the actual motive behind any crime, and the possibility of misadventure. The case has been described by one author as, "The most fascinating murder mystery of the century."

== Bella Wright ==
Annie Bella Wright was born on 14 July 1897 in Somerby, Leicestershire. She was the eldest of seven children born to an illiterate agricultural labourer and his wife. From around 1895 the family lived in a thatched cottage in the village of Stoughton, four miles outside Leicester.

Wright had attended school until the age of 12 before beginning work as a domestic servant, subsequently obtaining a job as a rubber hand at Bates & Co.'s St Mary's Mills, a rubber factory in Leicester, approximately five miles from her home. She regularly travelled to work on her bicycle. At the time of her death, she was working the late shift at the factory and was known to cycle between the villages and hamlets around Little Stretton to perform errands or visit acquaintances in the late afternoon.

At the time of her death, Wright—described as a girl with good looks and of good character—was 21 years old and engaged to be married to a Royal Navy stoker named Archie Ward, who served on HMS Diadem, a training ship in Portsmouth. She is known to have had at least one other suitor, and to have told her mother of an officer who had fallen in love with her. This may have been Ronald Light, although he denied this supposition in court.

== Ronald Light ==
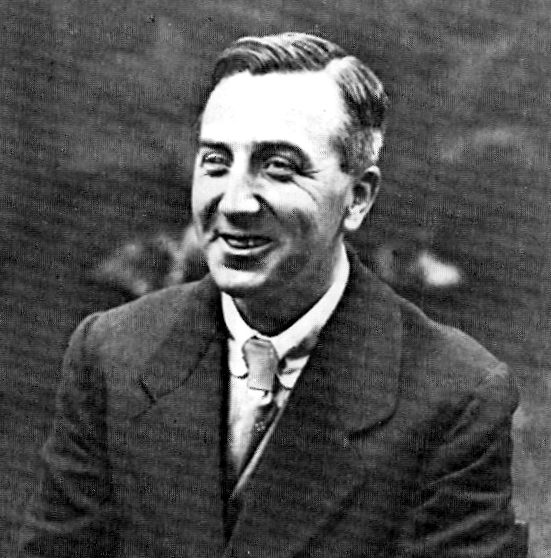
The accused, Ronald Light, pictured after his 1920 acquittal

Ronald Vivian Light was born on 19 October 1885, the son of a wealthy civil engineer who managed a Coalville colliery and reportedly also invented plumbing devices.

According to a prosecution brief from the murder trial, Light was expelled from Oakham School in 1902, at the age of 17, for "lifting a little girl's clothes over her head". (The same brief states that in his thirties he attempted to seduce a 15-year-old girl, and had admitted to engaging in "improper conduct" with an 8-year-old girl.) Light was a graduate of the University of Birmingham, where he graduated as a civil engineer before gaining employment as a draughtsman at the Derby Works of the Midland Railway in November 1906. He would be fired from this firm in August 1914, suspected of setting a fire in a cupboard and of drawing indecent graffiti in a lavatory. Light was later dismissed from employment at a farm, accused of setting fire to haystacks.

In May 1910, Light purchased a folding bicycle, manufactured by the Birmingham Small Arms Company (BSA), from Orton Bros. in Derby. This bicycle was a distinctive green colour, with an uncommon coaster brake. At approximately the same time, Light became a member of a Buxton-based Territorial company of the Royal Engineers.

Following the outbreak of the First World War, Light underwent training at Chatham, Newark and Ripon. He was commissioned as a second lieutenant in February 1915, before being deployed to the Western Front. Light relinquished his commission in the Royal Engineers on 1 July 1916 on the suggestion of his commanding officer. He returned to the ranks as a gunner in the Honourable Artillery Company. He was court-martialled in 1917 for forging move orders. After three years of active service, Light was classified as suffering from severe shell-shock and partial deafness, and was sent back to England to undergo psychiatric treatment. Following recuperation at several army hospitals in England, Light returned to live with his mother in Highfield Street, Leicester. He was demobilised in January 1919 and would later claim to have been "sent home a broken man."

On 21 September 1916, Light's father died in an apparent accident, although it has been posited that the death was a suicide caused by concern for his son's safety on the Western Front.

== 5 July 1919 ==
By all accounts, Wright and Light met by chance on 5 July 1919 at around 6.45 p.m. as she rode her bicycle to the village of Gaulby, where her uncle, George Measures, resided. According to Light's testimony at his trial, as he rode his bicycle towards the cross-roads where Gaulby Lane crosses Houghton Lane, he observed a young woman bending over her bicycle, and she asked him if he had a spanner to tighten a loose freewheel. Light did not but did what he could to resolve the problem.

Having learned that Wright was going to Gaulby, Light offered to accompany her, which she accepted. Light accompanied Wright to Measures' cottage before waiting for her outside the premises. En route, the two were observed by several independent witnesses. Measures later informed officers he liked neither the looks nor the mannerisms of Light, and that his niece had informed him she had only encountered this individual that evening, stating; "Oh him, I don't really know him at all. He's been riding alongside me for a few miles but he isn't bothering me at all. He's just chatting about the weather." Although Wright remarked to Measures that Light had behaved like a "perfect stranger" in her company, just before leaving his cottage, she jokingly informed him, "I hope he doesn't get too boring", before adding; "I shall try and give him the slip." When Wright exited the cottage and approached her bicycle, Light was overheard greeting her with the remark: "Bella, you have been a long time. I thought you had gone the other way." (Note: According to Light, immediately prior to Wright entering her uncle's cottage, she had said to him: "I shall only be ten minutes or a quarter of an hour." He had taken this comment as "a sort of suggestion that I should wait and we should ride back together". Thus, he had opted to wait for Wright outside Measures' cottage.)

The two rode away from Measures' cottage at approximately 8.50 p.m. According to Light's subsequent testimony, when the two approached a junction beyond King's Norton, Wright informed him she would have to "bid goodbye" at this stage as her intended route was to the left. He then claimed to have proceeded directly back to Leicester via Stoughton and Evington.

=== Discovery ===
Approximately thirty minutes after Wright and Light had ridden away from Measures' cottage, Wright's body was found on Gartree Road, part of the Via Devana Roman road, by a farmer named Joseph Cowell. Her body was discovered alongside her bicycle, and her face was extensively bloodied, with deep gouge marks visible on her cheeks and jaw. Surmising the girl may have been run off the road by a motorist, Cowell initially deduced she had fallen from her bicycle and fatally injured herself. He proceeded to nearby Great Glen to report his discovery to the constable, Alfred Hall, who phoned a Dr Williams in Billesdon. Dr Williams arrived at Hall's residence and the trio returned to Little Stretton, where the doctor gave instructions that the girl's body be moved to a nearby unoccupied house upon Cowell's trap.

At the scene, Hall found what he later described as "smears of blood on the top bar of the field gate", although he discovered no human footprints on either side of the gate. Nonetheless, a dead carrion crow was discovered in a field close to this gate. (Note: Hall would testify at Light's trial that the blood he had found on this gate came from a dead carrion crow that had "gorg[ed] itself on [Wright's] blood", with this crow apparently making six separate journeys from the gate to the corpse. However, at the initial inquest, ballistics expert Robert Churchill stated that this crow had also been shot, leaving a possibility that whoever had shot the bird had also shot Wright. This evidence was never presented to the jury at Light's trial.)

Dr Williams had also made a cursory candlelight examination of the scene before ordering Wright's body to be moved to the unoccupied house, having agreed with Cowell's initial assumption that she had died in a simple bicycle accident, dying from a combination of blood loss and a head injury. Not accepting this explanation, Hall returned to the murder scene at 6.00 a.m. the following morning to search for any signs of foul play. A careful search uncovered a .455-calibre bullet 17 feet (5.2 m) from where Wright's body had lain, slightly embedded in the ground by the imprint of a horse's hoof. Hall proceeded to the unoccupied house and washed the congealed blood off the face of Wright's corpse, finding a single entry wound beneath the left eye. Informed of Hall's discovery, Dr Williams and another doctor performed a full post-mortem upon the body, discovering the victim had been shot once beneath the left eye from a distance of six to seven feet, and that the bullet had exited the rear of her skull.

The dead girl was formally identified by relatives as Bella Wright. An inquest into her death returned a verdict of murder by person or persons unknown.

== Investigation ==
Police inquiries revealed nobody except Wright and her riding companion had been in the vicinity of Gartree Road at the time of her death. As several people had seen the riding companion, investigators were able to obtain a detailed description of this individual, who was described as being 35 to 40 years of age, with a broad full face and between 5 ft 7 in and 5 ft 9 in (170 and 175 cm) in height. He had been wearing a grey suit, a grey cap, collar and tie, and black boots. The Chief Constable of Leicestershire Police issued appeals in both the local and national press, urging this man to come forward and assist them with their inquiries. Nonetheless, these appeals proved unsuccessful.

Checks of premises where bicycles were bought, sold or repaired for the distinctive green bicycle also failed. However, on 10 July, a cycle repairman named Harry Cox informed police that the previous day, he had repaired a bicycle matching this description; Cox also informed police the man riding this bicycle had remarked to him of his intentions to go for "a ride in the country" on that very day. (Note: The description compiled by Leicestershire Police of the distinctive green bicycle and circulated via the local and national press described the bicycle as a gent's BSA 3-speed model bicycle with a green enamelled frame, black mudguards, an up-turned handlebar, a braking system that involved pedalling backwards and a Brooks saddle.)

Light would later claim not to have known about Wright's death until he had read a Leicester Mercury article on 8 July. According to his evidence, he realised the dire predicament he was now in, and worried over the matter for 'some time' before deciding to do nothing beyond removing his bicycle from where he normally stored it to the attic. Light claimed he had failed to come forward in response to the police and media appeals to avoid worrying his ailing mother. However, in October 1919, Light took his bicycle from the attic before proceeding to file off the serial numbers from the frame. He took the bicycle to the Upperton Road Bridge in Leicester, where he first detached the rear wheel to remove its distinctive coaster brake, then continued dismantling the bicycle. Each section—except the rear wheel with its coaster brake—was thrown into the River Soar; an act witnessed by a labourer named Samuel Holland, who had been walking to his night shift at a nearby mill.

=== Bicycle discovery ===
On 23 February 1920, one Enoch Whitehouse was guiding a horse-drawn barge, laden with coal, along the River Soar. The tow-rope of the barge snagged the frame of the green bicycle, bringing it to the surface of the canal. Whitehouse informed the police and a decision was made to drag the canal. Other pieces of the bicycle were discovered. Examining the frame of the bicycle, investigators discovered that although the serial number had been filed off both the frame and the seat lug, and the BSA brand name had been filed off the fork, a faint serial number was still visible on the inside of the front fork. Inquiries at businesses which bought, sold or otherwise repaired bicycles revealed this bicycle had been bought by Light nine years previously.

=== Arrest ===
Light was arrested on 4 March 1920 at Dean Close School in Cheltenham, where he had secured a position teaching mathematics two months previously. He was brought to Leicestershire to be charged with the murder of Wright.

Initially, Light denied having been in or near Gaulby on 5 July, or meeting Wright on that date. He also initially denied ever owning a green bicycle, but upon being informed of the remaining serial number on the fork, claimed to have sold it years before to an individual whose name he could no longer recall. Nonetheless, he was identified by witnesses as the individual who had been riding alongside Wright on the evening of her death, including by her uncle. Cox also identified Light from a police identity parade as being the green bicycle's owner. His mother's maid, Mary Elizabeth Webb, informed investigators that on 5 July, Light had not returned home until approximately 10 p.m., claiming his bicycle had broken down and that he had had to push it home. He had also sold or destroyed all the clothing he had worn that day.

On 19 March, additional pieces of evidence were found in the canal: an Army pistol holster, conclusively identified as having been issued to Light, and a dozen live .455-calibre bullets, precisely matching the spent bullet from the crime scene.

== Trial ==
The trial of Ronald Light opened in Leicester Castle on 8 June 1920. He was tried before Mr Justice Horridge and entered a plea of not guilty. The prosecution team consisted of Sir Gordon Hewart (the Attorney General), Norman Birkett and Henry Maddocks. He was defended by Sir Edward Marshall Hall.

The prosecution's contention was that a mile west of Gaulby, for unknown reasons, Wright had fled from Light, panicked and headed south on an inferior road that was a possible route home, but not the shortest one. Light took an alternate route with intentions to ambush her and had lain in wait at a gate where he shot her once before fleeing from the scene. To support this contention, eyewitnesses and other individuals were introduced to testify as to having seen Light in the company of Wright on the evening of her murder, to his ownership of the bicycle and his later efforts to both remove identifying marks on the bicycle, and dispose of the bicycle, the revolver holster and the unspent bullets in an obvious effort to conceal physical evidence linking him to the murder. Furthermore, upon his arrest, Light had proceeded to tell the police numerous lies until confronted with either proof or inconsistencies in his claims.

Two girls, Muriel Nunney (14) and Valeria Caven (12), would also testify for the prosecution that approximately three hours before Light had encountered Wright, he had pestered them as they rode their bicycles close to where Wright's body was subsequently found. (Note: When questioned by Norman Birkett as to the girls' claims, Light simply replied, "They are lying." Judge Horridge would instruct the jury to disregard the testimony of Nunney and Caven in his final instructions to the jury at the closure of Light's trial.)

"When Bella Wright was murdered, I knew from newspaper reports the next day that she was the girl I had been with just before she died. I knew the police wanted to question me. I became a coward again ... I never told a living soul what I knew. I got rid of everything that could have connected me with her [because] I was afraid ... I see now, of course, that I did the wrong thing."
Ronald Light testifying confessing in his own defence at his trial for the murder of Wright

At his own insistence and on the advice of his barrister, Light opted to testify in his own defence. In his testimony, Light conveyed himself in a well-spoken demeanour. He readily admitted to having lied to the police upon his arrest before essentially admitting to everything testified to by other witnesses presented at his trial but his possession of the service revolver, and Wright's killing, claiming they had parted company at a junction close to King's Norton soon after she had left her uncle's cottage in his company.

On cross-examination, Light admitted that the holster, bullets and bicycle recovered from the canal were indeed his, but claimed he had disposed of these items in a "panic", having read the press coverage surrounding Wright's murder, and noting the general public and media consensus that the man seen riding alongside her on a green bicycle had been responsible for her death. He admitted that, as an officer in the Army, he had owned a Webley Scott service revolver; however, he claimed that when posted overseas, he had taken the revolver with him but not the holster, and that when he had become a casualty, all of his belongings had been left in a casualty clearing station in France in 1918. Overall, Light's version of events, as he presented them to the court, could not be contradicted or disproved in any detail. Despite being subjected to five hours of cross-examination, he did not contradict himself on a single occasion. (Note: Light's prior offences went unreported by the newspapers of the time. Generally, press coverage of Light was sympathetic to an individual they portrayed as an "engineer, teacher and ex-Army officer" who stood accused of the murder of a simple "factory girl".)

Despite conceding that the prosecution had produced ample circumstantial evidence proving Light had indeed been in Wright's company shortly before her death, Marshall Hall stressed to the jury his client freely admitted the truth of their testimony, before emphasising the lack of a motive for his client to have killed Wright, adding the two had not known each other before their chance encounter on the evening of her death and she had not been robbed, attacked, or subjected to any form of sexual assault.

Marshall Hall restricted his own examination of Light largely to technical matters. He also questioned the testimony of the expert witness on ballistics, the Leicester gunsmith Henry Clarke, who had testified that the bullet which killed Wright had sustained damage which may have been caused by a ricochet and that the bullet could just as easily have been from a rifle as from a revolver. Thus a stray shot fired from a distance by another individual could have killed Wright through misadventure. Marshall Hall also contended that a person shot at close range from a service revolver would have sustained much greater damage to their face, whereas Wright had only a small entry wound beneath her left eye and a larger exit wound on the right side of her head. To this contention, Clarke replied, "It depends on the velocity." Marshall Hall argued that this alternative scenario was a more likely explanation for Wright's death. The jury deliberated for three hours before returning a verdict of not guilty, which was cheered by many spectators present.

== Aftermath ==
Wright was buried in the churchyard of St Mary and All Saints, Stoughton on 11 July 1919. In a ceremony conducted before several hundred mourners, the vicar of Stoughton, W. N. Westmore, asked all present to reflect on "this poor girl" who had been taken away from them. Several wreaths and flowers were placed on her coffin by her family, friends, neighbours and colleagues.

Following his acquittal, Light returned to live with his mother in Leicester, where he initially maintained a somewhat reclusive lifestyle. For a time, he assumed the name "Leonard Estelle". He was fined in December 1920 for registering under a false name at a hotel where he had been staying with a woman. By 1928 Light was living in Leysdown-on-Sea on the Isle of Sheppey, Kent. In 1934, he married widow Lilian Lester. (Note: Her first husband, Sgt Ernest Lester, also of the Royal Engineers, had been killed in action in 1917. The widow had abandoned her two sons in a Wolverhampton orphanage, fearful of destitution, but kept a younger daughter.)

Ronald Light died on 15 May 1975 at the age of 89. His body was cremated at Charing Crematorium, near Ashford, and his ashes were scattered in the crematorium's Garden of Remembrance. Light had no children of his own and his stepdaughter had no notion of Light's trial and acquittal until after his death.

With support from British Cycling, Leicester City Council organises an annual guided cycle ride which re-enacts the case. Participants visit significant locations pertinent to the events of 5 July 1919 and the police investigation before progressing to Leicester Castle, where segments of Light's trial are re-enacted.

For several decades following Light's acquittal, his green bicycle hung on the wall of an Evington cycle shop, although its current whereabouts are unknown. In a Christie's auction held in 1987, an anonymous bidder purchased Light's bullets and holster for $6,000.

Opinions among criminologists and authors alike vary as to both Light's guilt or innocence of Wright's murder, and the actual circumstances surrounding her death. For example, in his 1930 book, The Green Bicycle Case, author Herbert R. Wakefield contends Light had been innocent of Wright's death, whereas author Christine Wendy East concludes in her 1993 book The Green Bicycle Murder that Light was guilty as charged, adding that contemporary class structure—plus a degree of sympathy Light had extracted from the jury in his trial testimony—had played a significant role in his acquittal. Other writers have put forth views and conjecture regarding Wright's death, including the possibility that Light killed Wright accidentally while showing her his service revolver which inadvertently discharged, or that she was killed by someone else entirely. This accidental killing theory is backed by a note supposedly written by the Leicester superintendent of police, Levi Bowley, three days after Light's acquittal. Bowley's note claims that while in prison awaiting trial, Light confessed the accidental death scenario to him. The authenticity of this note has been questioned.

== See also ==
- Capital punishment in the United Kingdom
- Unsolved murders in the United Kingdom

== Cited works and further reading ==
- Blundell, Nigel; Boar, Roger (1991). The World's Greatest Unsolved Crimes. Hamlyn. ISBN 978-0-600-57231-2.
- Brown, Antony M. (2017). The Green Bicycle Mystery: The Curious Death of Bella Wright. Mirror Books. ISBN 978-1-907-32469-7.
- Donahue, Bill (December 2007). "The Green Bicycle Murder". Bicycling.
- East, Christine Wendy (1993). The Green Bicycle Murder. Alan Sutton. ISBN 978-0-750-90372-1.
- Lane, Brian (1991). The Murder Guide to Great Britain. London: Robinson Publishing Ltd. ISBN 978-1-854-87083-4.
- Marjoribanks, Edward (1989). Famous Trials of Marshall Hall. Penguin. pp. 329–342. ISBN 978-0-14-011556-7.
- Nash, Jay Robert (1981). Almanac of World Crime. United States of America: Anchor Press. p. 308. ISBN 978-1-461-74768-0.
- Newton, Michael (2004). The Encyclopedia of Unsolved Crimes. London: Checkmark Publishing. pp. 144–146. ISBN 978-0-816-07819-6.
- Pearson, Edmund (1990). The Green Bicycle Case. London: Guild Publishing. pp. 29–40. ISBN 978-1-85-480030-5.
- Smith, Sally, ed. (2021). Trial of Ronald Light: The Green Bicycle Case. Notable British Trials. Mango Books. ISBN 978-1914277139.
- Wakefield, Herbert (1930). The Green Bicycle Case: The Trial of Ronald Light for Murder. Philip Allan Publishing. ASIN B0018GM544.
- Wynn, Douglas (1996). On Trial for Murder. Pan Books. pp. 208–211. ISBN 978-0-09-472990-2.
