= Stretton (surname) =

Stretton is a surname. Notable people with the surname include:

- Alan Stretton (1922–2012), Australian Army officer
- Alan M. Stretton (born 1930s), Australian civil engineer
- Amanda Stretton (born 1973), English racing driver and motoring journalist
- Andrea Stretton (1952–2007), Australian arts journalist and television presenter
- Antony Stretton, English neuroscientist active in the United States
- Clement E. Stretton (1850–1915), English engineer, author, railway collector, and supporter of Operative Masonry
- Gordon Stretton (1887–1982), English-born Welsh-African-descended drummer active in the United Kingdom, France, and Argentina
- Hesba Stretton, the pen name of Sarah Smith (1832–1911), English writer of children's books
- Hugh Stretton (born 1924), Australian historian and professor
- Jessica Stretton (born 2000), British archer
- Pamela Stretton (born 1980), South African artist
- Philip Eustace Stretton (1865–1919), British painter
- Robert de Stretton (fl. mid-1300s), English clergyman
- Ronald Stretton (1930–2012), British track cyclist
- Ross Stretton (1952–2005), Australian ballet dancer and artistic director
- Samuel Stretton (1731–1811), English builder and architect
- Sempronius Stretton 1781–1842), British Army officer, known for sketches of Canadian life
- Severus William Lynam Stretton (1783–1884), British Army officer
- Simon Stretton, Australian musician, former judge, co-founder of 1970s punk band Black Chrome
- William Stretton (1755–1828), English builder and architect

== Fictional characters ==
- Sharon Watts, a fictional character in the British soap opera EastEnders
