= Listed buildings in Ford, Shropshire =

Ford is a civil parish in Shropshire, England. It contains 21 listed buildings that are recorded in the National Heritage List for England. Of these, two are at Grade II*, the middle of the three grades, and the others are at Grade II, the lowest grade. The parish contains the village of Ford and the surrounding countryside. The listed buildings are two country houses and associated structures, smaller houses, a church and a sundial in the churchyard, a public house, a milestone, and a war memorial.

== Key ==
Grade	Criteria
II*	Particularly important buildings of more than special interest
II	Buildings of national importance and special interest

== Buildings ==
Name and location	Photograph	Date	Notes	Grade
St Michael's Church; 52.71914°N 2.87164°W		12th century	The church was altered in the 14th century, and extended and partly rebuilt in 1875 by Edward Haycock Junior. It is built in Alberbury breccia and red sandstone with grey sandstone dressings and a tile roof. The church consists of a nave and chancel in one cell, a south porch, a north aisle, and a north vestry and chapel. At the west end is a bellcote, there is a cross on the east gable, and a conical finial at the junction of nave and chancel.	II
Oak Cottages; 52.71932°N 2.86718°W	—	15th century	Originally one house, it is timber framed with cruck construction, infill in lath and plaster and in red brick, and it has a tile roof. The original part is a hall of two bays, with a two-bay cross-wing added in the 16th century. The original part has one storey and an attic, and the cross-wing has two storeys. The windows are casements, and there is a gabled eaves dormer. Inside are two full cruck trusses.	II
Mansion House; 52.71906°N 2.87225°W		Early 17th century	The oldest part is the rear wing, which is timber framed with three bays, and there is an early 18th-century four-bay wing linking to the main range that was built in 1779. This is in brick on a chamfered stone plinth, with stone dressings, a band, a frieze, a moulded cornice, a parapet with moulded stone coping, and a double-span slate roof, hipped at the front. There are two storeys with attics, and a front of seven bays, the middle three bays projecting slightly under a pediment containing a heraldic carving. The windows are sashes, the central window in the upper floor having a moulded architrave and a stepped triple keystone. The doorway has a moulded architrave with Doric half-columns, a fluted frieze, and a triangular pediment.	II*
Brook House; 52.71857°N 2.87110°W	—	Mid 17th century	The house was remodelled in the 19th century. It is timber framed with brick nogging on a stone plinth, it is partly rendered, and part has been rebuilt in brick and sandstone. It has a tile roof, one storey and an attic, and three bays. The windows are casements, and there are two gabled eaves dormers. On the front is a gabled porch, and all the gables have pierced bargeboards and finials.	II
The Cross Gates Hotel; 52.71325°N 2.87569°W		1724	The public house is in brick on a rendered plinth, with bands, and a hipped slate roof with a parapeted gable end at the rear. There are two storeys and attic, an L-shaped plan, five bays, and wings at the rear. The windows are casements with segmental heads, and in the attic are gabled dormers. The doorway has panelled pilasters and a hood. On the front is a moulded datestone, and in the left return are canted bay windows.	II
Barn and wall, Ford House; 52.71972°N 2.87080°W	—	Early 18th century	The barn, later used for other purposes, is in red brick on a high stepped plinth, with a dentil eaves cornice, and a roof of tile and slate with parapeted gable ends and chamfered sandstone coping. It contains double doors, loft doors, a segmental-headed stable door, and ventilation slits. Adjoining to the southwest is a courtyard wall in red brick with red sandstone coping, it is about 15 metres (49 ft) long and 2 metres (6 ft 7 in) high, and contains a pair of wooden gates.	II
Courtyard wall, dovecote and outbuildings, Ford House; 52.71959°N 2.87065°W	—	Early 18th century	The courtyard retaining wall, probable dovecote and outbuilding are in red brick. The wall extends to the northeast from the house, it has chamfered red sandstone coping, and contains a blocked segmental archway. Incorporated into the wall is a probable former dovecote on a stepped plinth, with a dentil eaves cornice. It has two storeys, a pyramidal roof, and various openings. Beyond it is a lean-to with a corrugated iron roof.	II
Forecourt wall, Ford House; 52.71948°N 2.87125°W	—	Early 18th century	The wall encloses the garden at the front of the hall. It is in red brick with chamfered red sandstone coping, and is about 30 metres (98 ft) long and 1 metre (3 ft 3 in) high. The ends are ramped up to square piers, the north pier with a pyramidal sandstone cap, and the south with a concave stone cap.	II
Garden wall, Ford House; 52.71900°N 2.87096°W	—	Early 18th century	The garden wall is in red brick with chamfered red sandstone coping, and is about 150 metres (490 ft) long and 1.5 metres (4 ft 11 in) high. It contains a gateway and a doorway, and at the west end is a square gate pierwith a concave stone cap.	II
Stable block and wall, Ford House; 52.71957°N 2.87101°W	—	Early 18th century	The stable block is in red brick with a dentil eaves cornice, and a tile roof with parapeted gable ends and chamfered sandstone coping. It contains doorways, casement windows with segmental heads, ventilation holes, a circular window, and loft doors. Attached is a forecourt wall in red brick with sandstone coping, ramped up to a square gate pier with a pyramidal stone cap.	II
Terrace wall, gates, piers and steps, Ford House; 52.71941°N 2.87060°W	—	Early 18th century	The terrace wall is in red brick with chamfered red sandstone coping, and a T-shaped plan. There are two flights of steps, one in grey sandstone with eleven steps and a cast iron balustrade, and the other with ten brick steps. The gate piers are square, in brick, and have moulded cornices and globe finials, and the gates are in wrought iron. Under the terrace flanking the sandstone steps are two barrel vaulted brick chambers.	II
Ford Hall; 52.71807°N 2.86991°W	—	1729	A country house that was later remodelled. It is in brick on a red sandstone plinth, with a moulded eaves cornice, and a hipped tile roof. There are two storeys and an attic, and a front of three bays. The windows are sashes and there is a central gabled eaves dormer with a finial. The central doorway has moulded imposts, a radial fanlight, and a chamfered architrave.	II
Ford House; 52.71940°N 2.87085°W		c. 1730	A country house in red brick with grey sandstone dressings on a moulded plinth, with chamfered quoins, a modillion eaves cornice, and a two-span slate roof with parapeted gable ends and stone coping. There are two storeys, an attic and a basement, and a front of five bays. The porch has Tuscan columns and half-columns, and an entablature with a moulded cornice, and the doorway has a moulded architrave. The windows are sashes with moulded sills and triple keystones, and there are three dormers with triangular-pedimented gables. At the rear is a doorway with a rusticated surround, Tuscan pilasters, and a triangular pediment.	II*
Sundial, Ford House; 52.71937°N 2.87039°W	—	1752	The sundial is in the garden of the house. It is in grey sandstone, and consists of two square steps, and a baluster with a gadrooned lower part and an octagonal base and top. On the top is an octagonal dial and a gnomon with a fish support.	II
Tithe House; 52.69628°N 2.86903°W	—	1755	A red brick house on a stone plinth, that has a slate roof with parapeted gable ends, and sandstone coping. There is one story and an attic, two bays, and a recessed one-bay wing to the right. On the front is a gabled porch with a datestone, casement windows, and two gabled dormers.	II
Bank House; 52.69508°N 2.86130°W	—	Mid to late 18th century	A red brick farmhouse with a dentil eaves cornice, and a two-span tile roof. There are two storeys, two bays, a recessed two-storey one-bay wing to the left and a rear lean-to. On the front is a porch with a triangular pediment. The windows are casements, those in the main block with ogee heads and blind tympana.	II
Heath Cottage; 52.70632°N 2.86442°W	—	Early 19th century	A red brick farmhouse with a slate roof. There are two storeys and an L-shaped plan, three bays, and a lean-to extension recessed on the left. In the centre is a doorway with reeded pilasters, a frieze, and a triangular pediment, and the windows are sashes.	II
Sundial, St Michael's Church; 52.71905°N 2.87152°W	—	Early 19th century	The sundial is in the churchyard of St Michael's Church. It is in stone and in Gothic style. The sundial has an octagonal plan, a step, a double-chamfered base, a shaft with lancet panels, a string course, and an embattled top with an inscribed copper dial.	II
Churchyard gates and gate piers 52.71851°N 2.87143°W	—	1861	The gates are in cast iron with Gothic tracery. The square gate piers are monolithic in red sandstone with pyramidal caps. Between them is a wrought iron overthrow with scrolled decoration and central lamp.	II
Milestone; 52.71311°N 2.86647°W	—	Mid to late 19th century	The milestone is on the south side of the A458 road. It is in cast iron, and has a triangular plan, a narrow stem, a chamfered top and beaded sides. It is inscribed at the top with "FORD PARISH" and on the sides with the distances in miles to "POOL" (Welshpool) and to "SALOP" (Shrewsbury).	II
War memorial 52.71854°N 2.87159°W	—	1920	The war memorial is in the churchyard of St Michael's Church. It is in limestone on a domed platform, with a stepped octagonal plinth, and a square base, on which is an octagonal tapering shaft and a cross. On the base is an inscription and the names of those lost in the First World War, and on the steps is another inscriptions and the names of those lost in the Second World War.	II
