= Leebotwood railway station =

Former railway station in Shropshire, England

Leebotwood
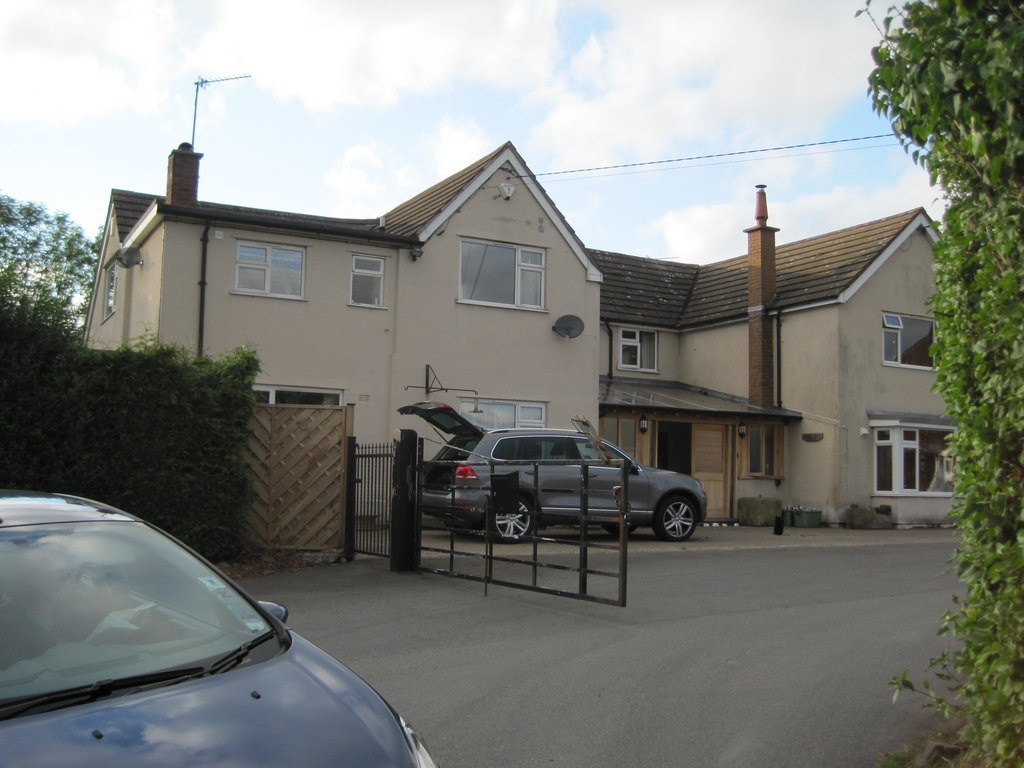
- The site of the station in 2012

General information
- Location: Leebotwood, Shropshire; England
- Coordinates: 52.5845°N 2.7791°W
- Grid reference: SO474988
- Platforms: 2

Other information
- Status: Disused

History
- Original company: Shrewsbury and Hereford Railway
- Pre-grouping: LNWR and GWR joint
- Post-grouping: LMS and GWR joint

Key dates
- 21 April 1852: Opened
- 9 June 1958: Closed
Location

Leebotwood railway station was a station in Leebotwood, Shropshire, England. The station was opened in 1852 and closed in 1958.

Preceding station	Disused railways	Following station
Dorrington; Line open, station closed	LNWR and GWR joint Shrewsbury and Hereford Railway	All Stretton Halt; Line open, station closed
