= Listed buildings in All Stretton =

All Stretton is a civil parish in Shropshire, England. The parish contains two listed buildings that are recorded in the National Heritage List for England. Both the listed buildings are designated at Grade II, the lowest of the three grades, which is applied to "buildings of national importance and special interest". The parish contains the village of All Stretton, and is otherwise entirely rural, and the listed buildings consist of a farmhouse and a milestone

== Buildings ==
Name and location	Photograph	Date	Notes
Brook House; 52.57399°N 2.78141°W	—	Early to mid 17th century	A timber framed farmhouse with plastered infill, a right gable end in rendered sandstone, and a tiled roof. There are two bays. Part of the farmhouse has two storeys, and part has one storey with an attic. Most of the windows are casements, and there is a gabled half-dormer.
Milestone; 52.56319°N 2.78995°W		Early to mid 19th century	The milestone is by the side of the B5477 road. It is in sandstone and has a segmental top. The milestone is inscribed "SALOP 11".
