= Westbury, Shropshire =

Village in Shropshire, England

Coordinates: 52.679°N 2.953°W

Westbury
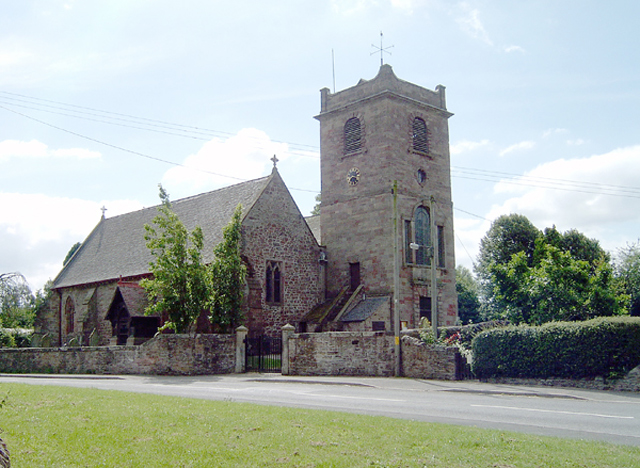
- St Mary's church in Westbury.

- Location within Shropshire
- Area: 15 sq mi (39 km^{2})
- Population: 1,352
  - Density: 90/sq mi (35/km^{2})
- OS grid reference: SJ355094
- Civil parish: Westbury
- Unitary authority: Shropshire Council
- Ceremonial county: Shropshire
- Region: West Midlands
- Country: England
- Sovereign state: United Kingdom
- Post town: SHREWSBURY
- Postcode district: SY5
- Dialling code: 01743
- Police: West Mercia
- Fire: Shropshire
- Ambulance: West Midlands
- UK Parliament: Shrewsbury and Atcham

Westbury is a village and parish in Shropshire, England. It includes the settlements of Caus Forest, Lake, Marche, Newtown, Stoney Stretton, Vennington, Wallop, Westbury, Whitton, Winsley and Yockleton. It lies 135 m above sea level, 8 miles (13 km) west of Shrewsbury and close to the Wales-England border. It had a population of 1,352 according to the 2011 census. In 2005, Westbury parish expanded with the annexation of half of the former Wollaston parish.

== History ==
=== Roman ===
During the Roman settlement of Britain, it was an outpost of Wroxeter. The present Shrewsbury to Westbury road is thought to follow the alignment of a Roman road from Wroxeter to forts at Forden Gaer and Caersws. In about 1848, a piece of lead was found with markings of the name of the Roman Emperor Aurelian.

=== Middle Ages ===
During the early Middle Ages, the Rea Valley was of strategic importance in the defence of the Welsh Marches west of Shrewsbury as the main route from Montgomery to Shrewsbury came through the village. Frontier guards are said to have been killed at Westbury in 1053 when Ernui held the manor. About one mile (1.6 km) from Westbury lie the scant ruins of Caus Castle. Built in the late 11th century originally, it was used as a border stronghold. Westbury’s strategic importance was diminished after the Norman Conquest when Montgomery Castle was built.

=== Domesday ===
Westbury is recorded in Domesday Book as the property of Roger Fitz Corbet, who held it on behalf of the Earl of Shrewsbury, Roger de Montgomery. Two priests were also recorded as incumbents at Westbury church. After the lapse of the suzerainty of the Earls of Shrewsbury in 1102, the manor was held by the barony of Caus until the end of feudal tenures.

=== 18th and 19th centuries ===
The road to Asterley originated as a field road to the Common Wood of Hinwood, but became of some importance in the 18th century when used by coal wagons from the Asterley Mines. In the Middle Ages the road which passes through Vennington and along the crest of the Long Mountain was the principal route between Shrewsbury and Newtown, and was still used as an alternative route to Welshpool up to the 1820s.

In 1870–72, Westbury was described by John Marius Wilson's Imperial Gazetteer of England and Wales like this:

"WESTBURY, a township and a parish in Atcham district, Salop. The township lies on the Shrewsbury and Welshpool railway, 11½ miles W by S of Shrewsbury; contains a village of its own name; and has a post-office under Shrewsbury, and a r[ailway]. station. Real property, £6,174; of which £200 are in mines. Pop[ulation]. in 1851, 1,497; in 1861, 1,655. Houses, 298. The property is not much divided. The parish includes Minsterley chapelry, and forms a sub-district. Acres, 11,274. Rated property in 1869, £16,158. Pop., 2,545. Houses, 476. The living is a rectory in the diocese of Hereford. Value, £766. Patron, R. Cholmondeley, Esq. The church is good. The p[erpetual]. curacy of Minsterley is a separate benefice. There are dissenting chapels, an endowed school with £30 a year and charities £44."

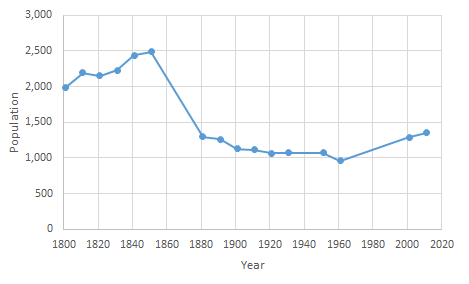
Total Population of Westbury Civil Parish, Shropshire, as reported by the Census of Population from 1881 to 2011.

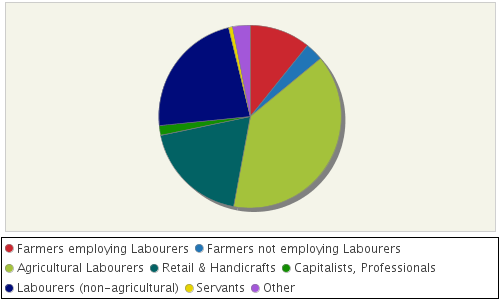
Pie chart showing males aged 20 & over, in 9 occupational categories in 1831.

In 1831, the dominating occupation was working in agriculture and farming. There were no manufacturing jobs in 1831; in 2001 there were 80, which decreased to 52 in 2011. Several coal and lead mines were being worked near Shrewsbury and Westbury at the former time. Many collieries were closed by 1921, with the last closing in 1941.

== Amenities ==
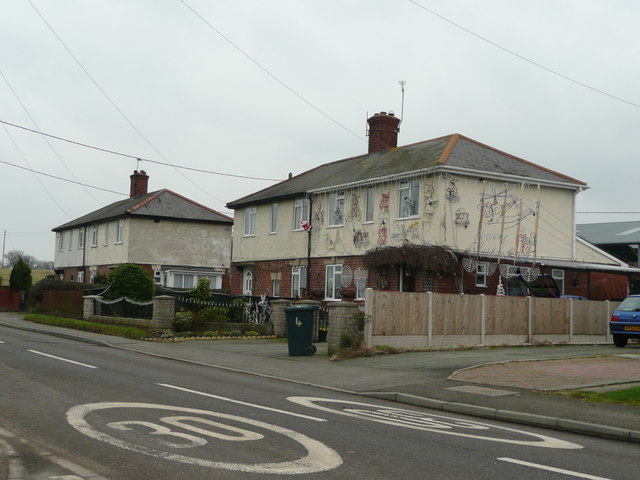
Council-built housing in Westbury

The village has a Marstons pub called The Lion, a medical practice surgery and a cemetery on Hinwood Road.

St Mary's Church of England-aided primary school closed in 2017, merging in a federation with Worthen and Hope into the Long Mountain School at Worthen.

== Transport ==
Westbury is situated on the B4386 road which links Shrewsbury and Montgomery.

The village was served by Westbury station on the Cambrian Line between 1862 and 1960. The line remains operational.

== Notable people ==
- The native Welsh Prince Llywelyn the Great (1173–1240) is believed to have spent part of his childhood at Caus Castle in the parish after his widowed mother Marared remarried into the Corbet family.
- Henry Stafford, 1st Baron Stafford (1501–1563), died at Caus Castle.
- Sir Thomas Higgons (c1624-1691), politician and diplomat, was son of a Rector of Westbury.
- Elhanan Bicknell (1788–1861), London art collector, lived at Caus for a year to learn farming.
- William Cureton (1808–1864), Orientalist, was born and died at Westbury.
- John Edmund Severne (1826–1899), Conservative politician, lived at Wallop Hall in Westbury parish, buried in Westbury Churchyard.
- John Doogan (1853–1940), Victoria Cross recipient, was living at Cause Mountain in Westbury parish in 1911.
- Sir Smith Child, 2nd Baronet (1880–1958), Conservative politician and former army officer, lived at Whitton Hall in the parish and is buried in Westbury Churchyard.

== See also ==
- Listed buildings in Westbury, Shropshire
