= Yockleton =

Village in Shropshire, England

Coordinates: 52.685°N 2.889°W

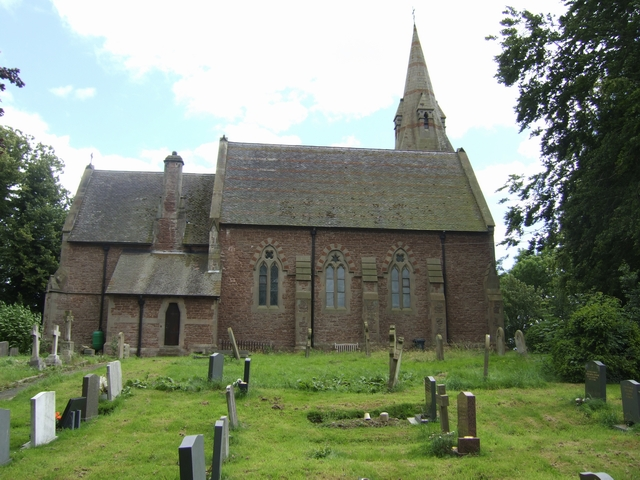
- Holy Trinity Church, Yockleton

- Location within Shropshire
- OS grid reference: SJ399101
- Civil parish: Westbury
- Unitary authority: Shropshire
- Ceremonial county: Shropshire
- Region: West Midlands
- Country: England
- Sovereign state: United Kingdom
- Post town: SHREWSBURY
- Postcode district: SY5
- Dialling code: 01743
- Police: West Mercia
- Fire: Shropshire
- Ambulance: West Midlands
- UK Parliament: Shrewsbury and Atcham

Yockleton is a village in Shropshire, England.

Yockleton is west of the county town of Shrewsbury, on the B4386 road to Montgomery and near the River Severn. The population as taken at the 2011 census can be found under Westbury.

Yockleton is near to Ford (to its north) and Westbury (to its west), and lies in the Westbury civil parish; the hamlets of Edge and Farley (both in Pontesbury parish) lie due south of the village, and Nox is to the east.

== Amenities ==
There is one local pub, the Yockleton Arms (formerly the Pink Elephant), several miles west on the B4386, a 19th-century village church (C of E) dedicated to the Holy Trinity, and a village hall, as well as an old people's home called Yockleton Grange in the old Vicarage. There is a Motte and Bailey in a field not far from the church.

Previously Yockleton had a school, a garage, a post office and a pub in the heart of the village. These have closed as the village has developed into a commuter village for Shrewsbury.

Previously served by Yockleton railway station on the Cambrian Line. The station closed in 1960.

== Notable people ==
- Lily Chitty (1893-1979), archaeologist, lived at Yockleton when her father was Rector there between 1920-1938.
- General Sir Geoffrey Musson (1910-2008), senior British Army officer, was born here.

== See also ==
- Listed buildings in Westbury, Shropshire
