= Little Stretton, Leicestershire =

Village in Leicestershire, England

Coordinates: 52.595567°N 1.013709°W

Little Stretton
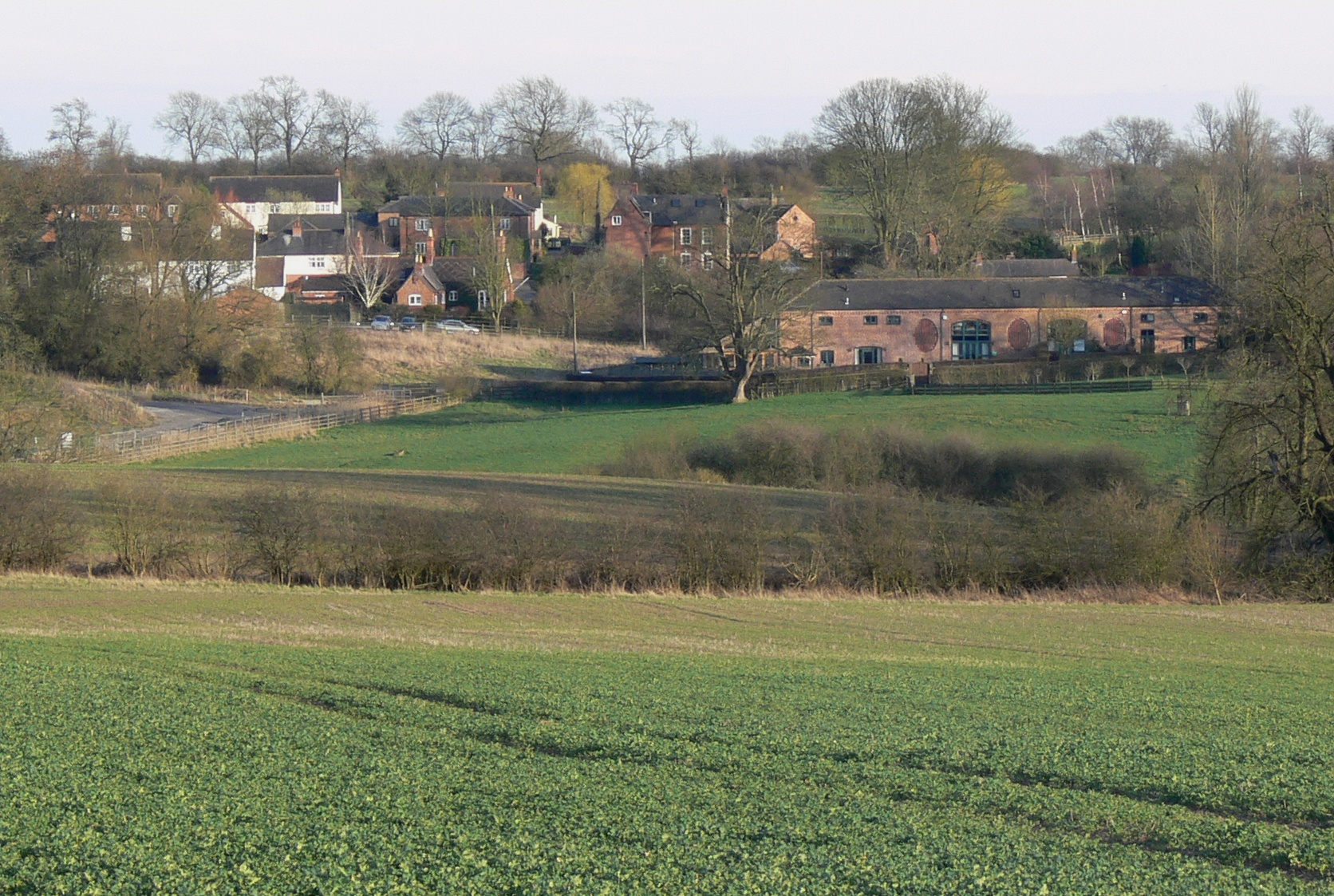
- Little Stretton (2011)

- Location within Leicestershire
- Area: 1.6802 sq mi (4.352 km^{2})
- Population: 92 (2011)
  - Density: 55/sq mi (21/km^{2})
- OS grid reference: SK669002
  - London: 84.5 mi (136.0 km)
- Civil parish: Little Stretton
- District: Harborough
- Shire county: Leicestershire
- Region: East Midlands
- Country: England
- Sovereign state: United Kingdom
- Post town: LEICESTER
- Postcode district: LE2
- Dialling code: 0116
- Police: Leicestershire
- Fire: Leicestershire
- Ambulance: East Midlands
- UK Parliament: Harborough, Oadby and Wigston

Little Stretton (otherwise Stretton Parva) is a small village and civil parish in the Harborough district of Leicestershire that lies approximately 5.53 miles (8.90 km) southeast of the city of Leicester. The parish includes the deserted medieval village of Great Stretton (or Stretton Magna, a scheduled monument that is located 0.7 miles (1.1 km) to the west of the village. The Gartree Road, a Roman Road, runs through the parish, adjacent to both Little and Great Stretton, and is the reason for those settlements' names (see: Stretton). According to the University of Nottingham English Place-names project, the settlement name Stretton means "strēt" (Anglian) for a Roman road; and "tūn" (Old English) for a settlement or an estate. The population of the civil parish at the 2011 census was 92, with approximately 36 households.

== Geography ==
Little Stretton is situated on the south side of the river Glen, between the villages of Houghton on the Hill 2.15 miles (3.46 km) to the north, Great Glen to the south 1.75 miles (2.82 km), King's Norton 1.25 miles (2.01 km) to the east, and Oadby 2.81 miles (4.52 km) to the west. The soils are Slightly acid loamy and clayey, with more seasonally wet base-rich loamy and clayey soils beyond the village to the south and east, according to UK Soil Observatory results. The bedrock geology of the settlement is Charmouth Mudstone, a sedimentary bedrock formed between 199.3 and 182.7 million years ago during the Jurassic period.

== History ==
Evidence for prehistoric activity is very limited. An archaeological assessment in 2011 listed an Iron Age enclosure to the south west of Manor Farm, and the presence of the ‘Gartree Road’ a Roman road only a few metres to the south west (probably the Via Devana to Ratae).

The Domesday Book Survey of 1086 lists Little Stretton and Great Stretton as Stretton, situated in the Hundred of Gartree, Leicestershire. It had an estimated population of 9.6 households (representing the heads of families, with an average 5 persons per household) and was considered to be a small settlement in 1086. The poll tax returns of 1381 list 53 persons that were deemed eligible to pay. Almost 200 years later in 1563, 19 families were recorded. The population in 1801 was 97, followed by an increase to 128 in 1821.

In 1870–72, John Marius Wilson's Imperial Gazetteer of England and Wales described Stretton Parva as follows:

STRETTON-PARVA, a chapelry in Kings Norton parish, Leicestershire; 3 miles N by E of Glenn r. station, and 5¾ SE of Leicester. Post town, Leicester. Real property, £1,196. Pop., 83. Houses, 19. The living is annexed to Kings-Norton."

The neighbouring Stretton Magna at the same time held 7 households with a population of 42.

By the 1890s, "The Comprehensive Gazetteer of England & Wales, 1894-5" revealed a slight decline in population to 72. By 1951 the census returned a count of 105 residents in Little Stretton.

== Churches ==
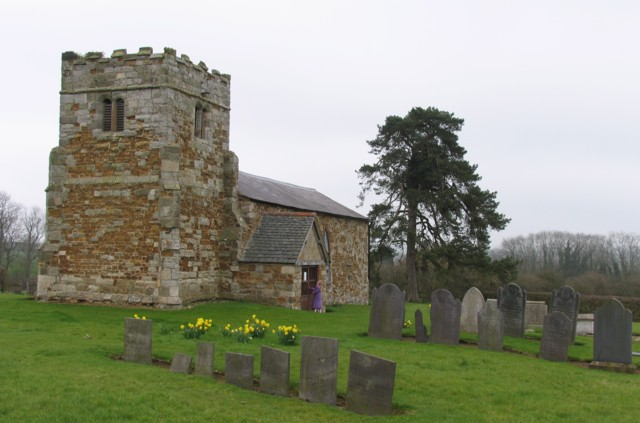
St Giles' Church, Great Stretton

The parish has two medieval churches, St Giles of Stratton Magna and St Clement and St John the Baptist of Stratton Parva. The church of Little Stretton, St Clement and St John the Baptist, has historically been a chapel of ease served from the ecclesiastical parish of St John the Baptist, King's Norton.

=== Rectors, Vicars and Patrons ===
- 1220 William de Kibworth
- 1234 Robert de Diwurne
- 1238 William Ordiz
- 1261 Simon de Slybur
- 1287 Roger de Barneburg
- 1391 Richard Dollesdon
- 1534 Thomas Burg
- 1560 Thomas Tookie
- 1671 James Rosse
- 1714 William Wallis
- 1726 Francis Miles
- 1733 Thomas Milward
- 1737 John Vann
- 1749 William Ludlam
- 1783 Thomas Rogers
- 1788 Richard Walker
- 1826 Thomas Charles Ord
- 1844 Hugh Palliser de Costobadie
- 1887 Caleb Eacott
- 1911 Hubert Woodall Brown
- 1938 Walter Ricon Davis
- 1948 John Sydney Lewis David
- 1951 Frank Allen Cox
- 1956 Edward Hudspith
- 1963 Derek Henry Kingham
- 1973 Albert Edward Kemp
- 1983 Roger Wakeley
- 1988 Ashley Frederick Bruce Cheeseman
- 2010 John Morley
- 2012 Vacant

== Anecdotes ==
In 1919, the village gained a certain notoriety as the location of the Green Bicycle Case, the killing of Bella Wright.

== See also ==
- Stretton Hall, Leicestershire
