= Ford, Shropshire =

Coordinates: 52.717°N 2.870°W

Ford
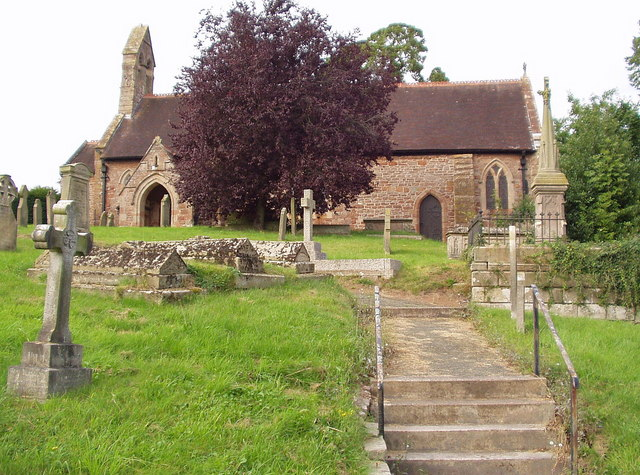
- Ford church, Shropshire

- Location within Shropshire
- Population: 890 (2011)
- OS grid reference: SJ413137
- Civil parish: Ford
- Unitary authority: Shropshire
- Ceremonial county: Shropshire
- Region: West Midlands
- Country: England
- Sovereign state: United Kingdom
- Post town: SHREWSBURY
- Postcode district: SY5
- Dialling code: 01743
- Police: West Mercia
- Fire: Shropshire
- Ambulance: West Midlands
- UK Parliament: Shrewsbury and Atcham

Ford is a village and civil parish in Shropshire, England. The civil parish population at the 2011 census was 890.

Ford lies west of the county town of Shrewsbury, just off the A458 road and near to the River Severn, at grid reference SJ413137. The Royal Mail postcode is SY5.

== History ==
Ford was mentioned in the Domesday Book and had a population of 50 villagers, 14 smallholders, 20 slaves, and 6 female slaves. It was part of the lands of earl Roger de Montgomery of Shrewsbury.

== Church ==
St Michael's Church, Ford, built in the 12th century, is located in the older part of the village. A morning Holy Communion Service takes place at 9.30am on the second and fourth Sunday of the month. An Evensong Service takes place at 6.30pm on the 1st and 3rd Sundays of the month (this is moved to 4.30pm in Winter). A cricketer, William Wingfield, was vicar of Ford in 1860–63.

== School ==
Ford has a primary school, Trinity CE Primary, which was formed through merging the schools of Ford, Yockleton and Wattlesborough.

== Railway ==
The village was served by the Ford and Crossgates station on the Shropshire and Montgomeryshire Railway. The line was requisitioned in 1941 to serve the new Central Ammunition Depot Nesscliffe and one of the four sub-sites for ammunition storage was constructed next to Ford and Crossgates station; in 2010 ten storage buildings remained in use for civilian purposes.

== Businesses ==
There is one pub in Ford, Smokestop BBQ, which is a barbecue-themed pub run on smokehouse lines similar to an 'average pub' in the United States. It is in the west part of the village. It had been run for three years under its previous name The Cross Gates, then in its present name for two, by former footballer Jake King, who sold it in 2016.

The Pavement Gates (previously The Owen Glendower) is now an Indian restaurant called Saffron Cottage, and is next to the Shell garage. The garage now includes a Nisa shop, which is the only shop in the village.

== See also ==
- Listed buildings in Ford, Shropshire
