= Little Stretton Halt railway station =

Former railway station in Shropshire, England

Little Stretton
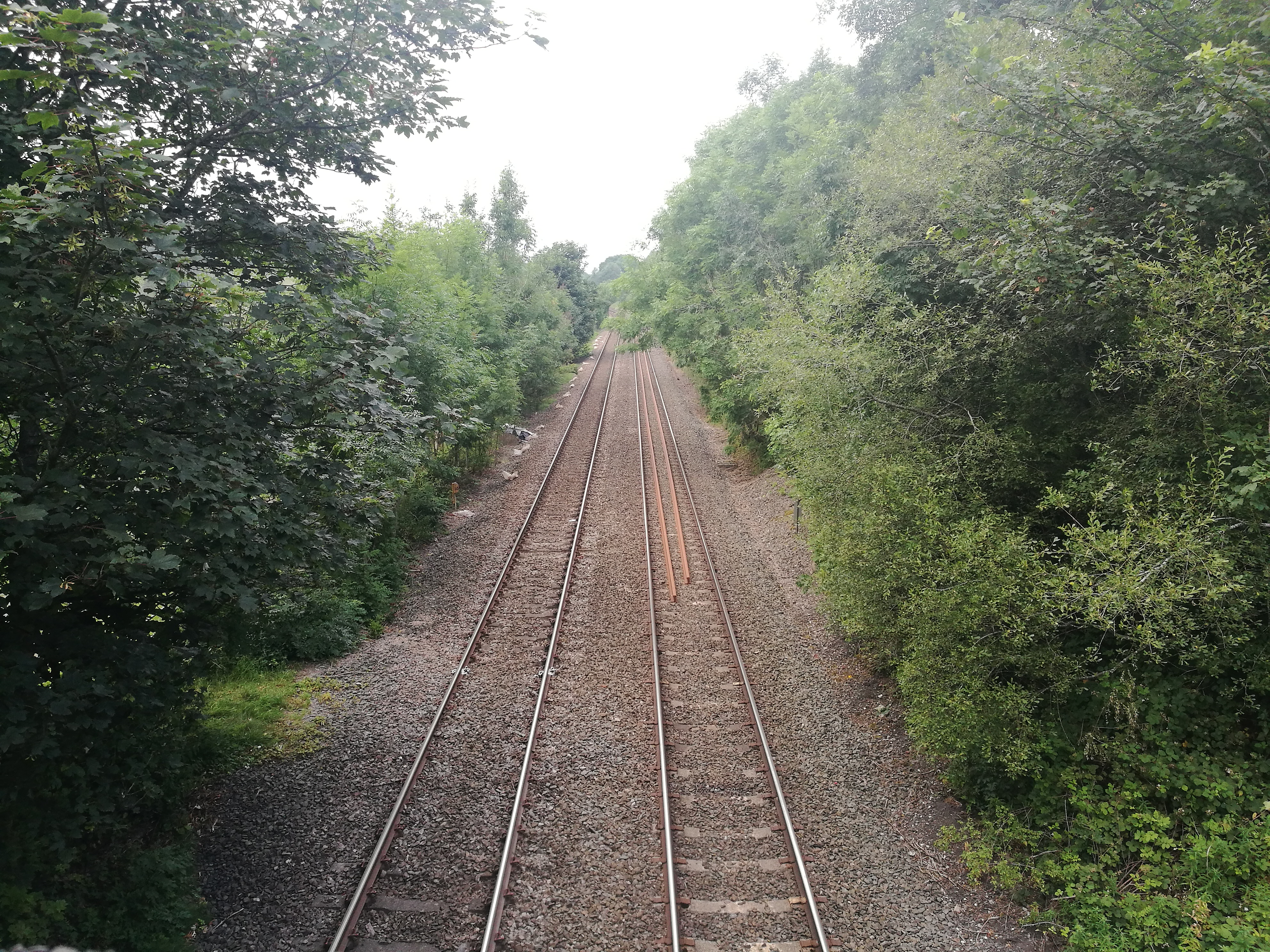

General information
- Location: Little Stretton, Shropshire; England
- Coordinates: 52.522°N 2.818°W
- Grid reference: SO446919
- Platforms: 2

Other information
- Status: Disused

History
- Original company: Shrewsbury and Hereford Joint Railway
- Post-grouping: Shrewsbury and Hereford Joint Railway

Key dates
- 18 April 1935: Station opened
- 4 January 1943: Station closed
- 6 May 1946: Station reopened
- 9 June 1958: Station closed
Location

Little Stretton Halt was a minor railway station on the Welsh Marches Line between Craven Arms and Church Stretton in Shropshire, England.

== History ==
Opened by the independent Shrewsbury and Hereford Railway in 1852–53, the line through Little Stretton became the joint property of the Great Western Railway and the London and North Western Railway (LNWR) in 1870; the LNWR interest passed to the London, Midland and Scottish Railway during the Grouping of 1923. Little Stretton Halt was opened on that line on 18 April 1935; it closed temporarily between 4 January 1943 and 6 May 1946. The line then passed on to the London Midland Region of British Railways on nationalisation in 1948. The station was closed by the British Transport Commission on 9 June 1958.

Preceding station	Historical railways	Following station
Marshbrook; Line open, station closed	Shrewsbury and Hereford Railway	Church Stretton; Line and station open

== The site today ==
Trains continue to run on the Welsh Marches Line. Nothing remains of the halt. The nearest station to Little Stretton is now at Church Stretton, a mile to the north.

== See also ==
- All Stretton Halt railway station

== Bibliography ==
- Awdry, Christopher (1990). Encyclopaedia of British Railway Companies. London: Guild Publishing. CN 8983.
- Butt, R. V. J. (October 1995). The Directory of Railway Stations: details every public and private passenger station, halt, platform and stopping place, past and present (1st ed.). Sparkford: Patrick Stephens Ltd. ISBN 978-1-85260-508-7. OCLC 60251199. OL 11956311M.
- Jowett, Alan (2000). Jowett's Nationalised Railway Atlas (1st ed.). Penryn, Cornwall: Atlantic Transport Publishers. ISBN 978-0-906899-99-1. OCLC 228266687.
- Jowett, Alan (March 1989). Jowett's Railway Atlas of Great Britain and Ireland: From Pre-Grouping to the Present Day (1st ed.). Sparkford: Patrick Stephens Ltd. ISBN 978-1-85260-086-0. OCLC 22311137.
- Little Stretton Halt on navigable 1954 O.S. map
