= All Stretton Halt railway station =

Former railway station in Shropshire, England

All Stretton

General information
- Location: All Stretton, Shropshire; England
- Coordinates: 52.5507°N 2.7931°W
- Grid reference: SO462950
- Platforms: 2

Other information
- Status: Disused

History
- Original company: Shrewsbury and Hereford Railway
- Post-grouping: Shrewsbury and Hereford Railway

Key dates
- 29 February 1936: Station opened
- 4 January 1943: Station closed
- 6 May 1946: Station reopened
- 9 June 1958: Station closed
Location

All Stretton Halt was a minor railway station on the Welsh Marches Line between Shrewsbury and Church Stretton in the English county of Shropshire.

== History ==
Opened by the independent Shrewsbury and Hereford Railway, the line through All Stretton became a joint Great Western Railway and London, Midland and Scottish Railway line during the Grouping of 1923. The line then passed on to the London Midland Region of British Railways on nationalisation in 1948. The station was then closed by the British Transport Commission.

Preceding station	Historical railways	Following station
Church Stretton; Line and station open	Shrewsbury and Hereford Railway	Leebotwood; Line open, station closed

== The site today ==
Trains continue to run on the Welsh Marches Line. Nothing remains of the halt. The nearest station to All Stretton is now at Church Stretton, a mile to the south.

== See also ==
- Little Stretton Halt railway station
