= Alan M. Stretton =

Australian civil engineer

Alan Murdoch Stretton (born 1930s) is an Australian civil engineer, project management manager, retired Adjunct Professor of Project Management at the University of Technology, Sydney and author. He is known for his work on the state of project management, and its history.

== Education and early career ==
Stretton obtained his BSc in civil engineering from the University of Tasmania, and his MS in mathematics from the Oxford University in the 1950s. He was the Rhodes Scholar for Tasmania in 1948.

From the 1950s to 1988, Stretton made his career in the construction as designer and project manager from Australia and New Zealand to the United States. In his days he witnessed the emerge of "project management of construction... information and control systems, internal management education programs and organizational change projects."

== Further career and acknowledgement ==
In 1988, Stretton joined the Faculty of Design, Architecture and Building at the University of Technology, Sydney (UTS), where he later became appointed Adjunct Professor of Project Management. As a start he established a Master of Project Management program at the University. After his retirement in 2006 he joined the University of Management and Technology (United States) faculty.

From 1998 to 1992, Stetton chaired the Standards Committee of the Project Management Institute (PMI), which developed the Project Management Body of Knowledge, first published by the PMI in 1996. Stretto co-authored parts of it. Later in the 1990s he continued these standardization efforts at the Australian Institute of Project Management (AIPM).

In 1996, Stretton was elected Life Fellow of the Australian Institute of Project Management (AIPM), and in 2015 he was awarded the honorary doctorate in strategy, programme and project management from the French business school ESC Lille.

== Selected publications ==
- Stretton, A. "A Short History of Modern Project Management," in: Australian Project Manager, Part 1 in Vol 14, No 1, March 1994; Part 2 in Vol 14, No 2, July 1994; and Part 3 in Vol 14, No 3, October 1994.
- Stretton, A. "Program management diversity—opportunity or problem." PM World Today 11.6 (2009).
- Stretton, A. "A Short History of Modern Project Management." in: PM World Today, Vol. IX, Issue X. October 2007. p. 1-18. (online at tnstate.edu)
- Stretton, Alan. "Notes on effective project cost control." PM World Today 11.X (2009).
- STRETTON, Alan. "Relationships between project management and general management." PM World Today 12 (2010).
- Stretton, Alan. "Involving program/project managers in organizational strategic planning?." PM World Today 13 (2011).
