= Church Stretton railway station =

Railway station in Shropshire, England

Coordinates: 52.5375°N 2.8035°W

Church Stretton
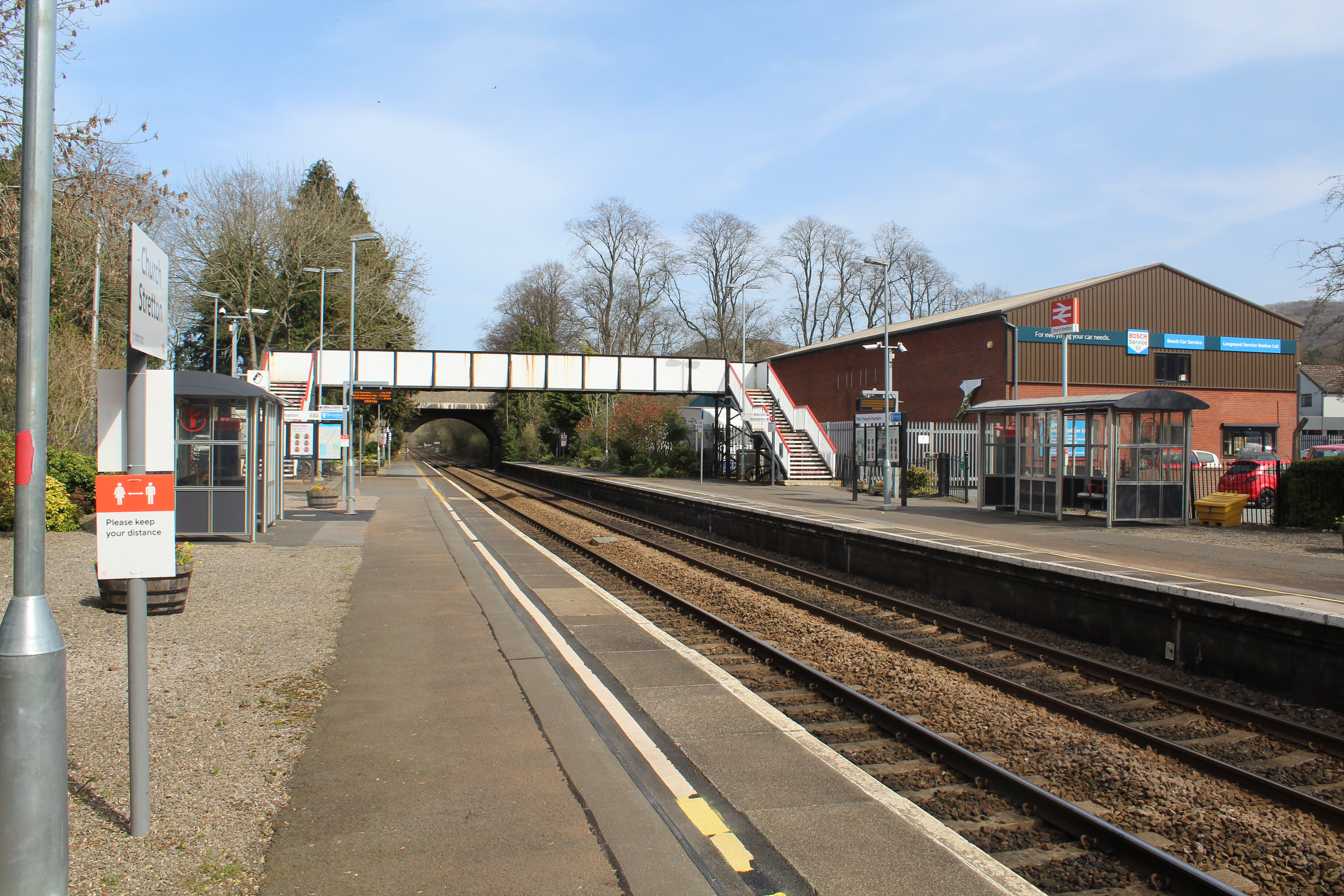
- The station looking north towards Shrewsbury, 2021

General information
- Location: Church Stretton, Shropshire, England
- Grid reference: SO455935
- Managed by: Transport for Wales
- Platforms: 2

Other information
- Station code: CTT
- Classification: DfT category F1

Key dates
- 1852: Opened
- 1914: Station moved

Passengers
- 2020/21: ▼45,818
- 2021/22: ▲0.114 million
- 2022/23: ▼0.111 million
- 2023/24: ▼0.105 million
- 2024/25: ▲0.123 million
Location
Notes
- Passenger statistics from the Office of Rail and Road

Church Stretton railway station serves the town of Church Stretton, in Shropshire, England. It is on the Welsh Marches line, 12 3/4 miles (20.5 km) south of Shrewsbury; trains on the Heart of Wales line also serve the station. All services are operated by Transport for Wales, which also manages the station.

The station is the highest point of the line between Shrewsbury and Craven Arms and is the highest station in Shropshire; on the northbound platform, a small plinth notes the station's altitude: 613 ft (187 m) above sea level.

== History ==
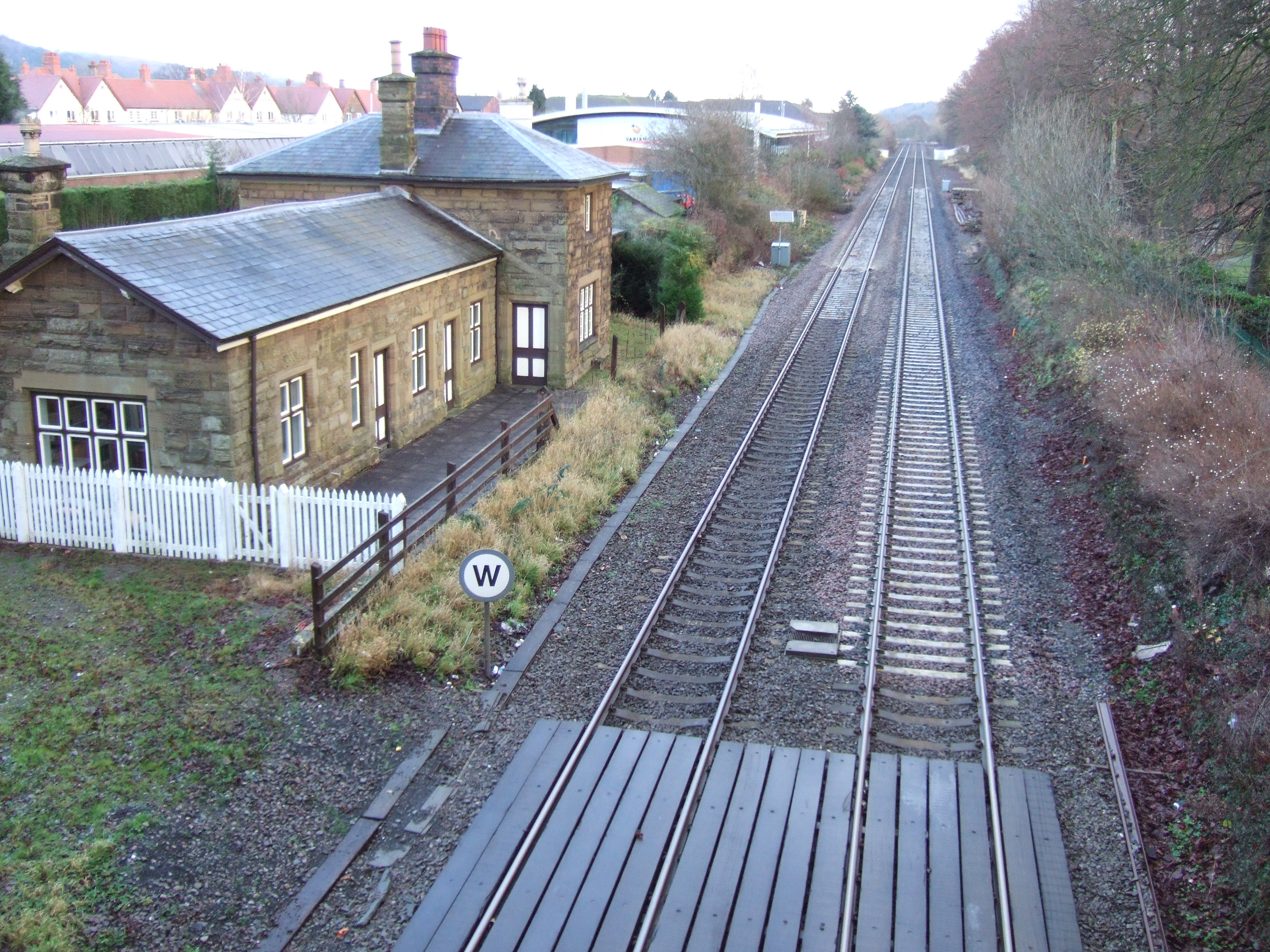
The site of the original (1852) station, north of Sandford Avenue

The station opened on 20 April 1852, as part of the newly created Shrewsbury and Hereford Railway. It was originally to the north of what is now Sandford Avenue and the old station building still remains, but is no longer in railway use. Sandford Avenue had been called Lake Lane for centuries and became Station Road with the arrival of the railway in the town, before becoming Sandford Avenue in 1884. The original station building was designed by Thomas Mainwaring Penson.

In 1914, the station was relocated just to the south of the Sandford Avenue road bridge. New station buildings were erected, but these were demolished in 1970 with the station having become unstaffed in 1967. Today, the only station structures in use are two passenger shelters on the platforms and a footbridge.

== Facilities ==
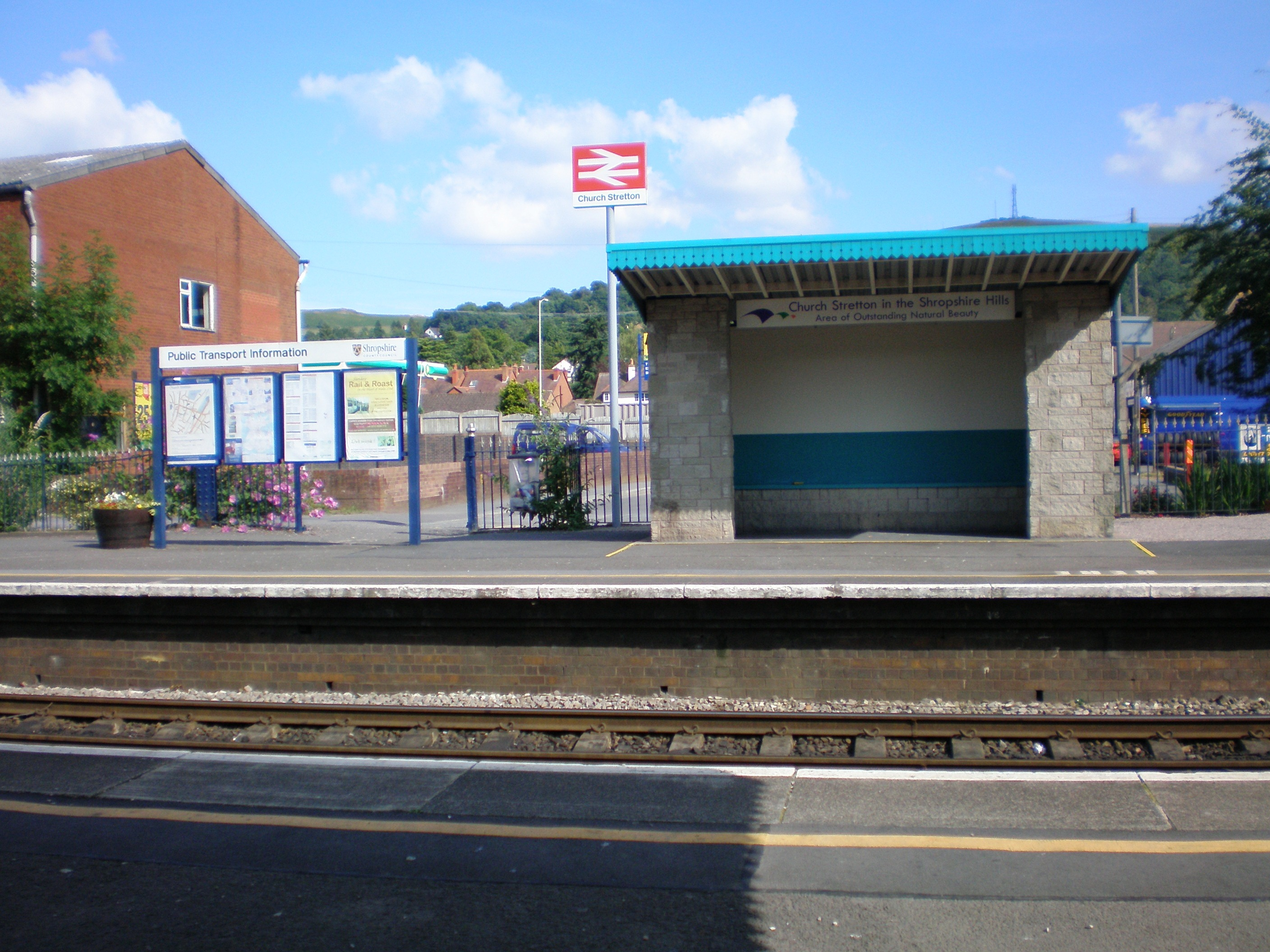
The southbound passenger shelter on platform 2 (since replaced)

The station has two platforms, one for northbound services (platform 1) and the other for southbound services, with a footbridge crossing the line connecting the two. The shelters were replaced and electronic information displays were installed in 2011. CCTV was also installed and, together with the new shelters, has reduced anti-social behaviour. In 2013, a ticket machine was installed on platform 1.

There are two small areas for car parking/dropping off on either side of the line: one can be accessed from Sandford Avenue (the B4371), the other from Crossways, off the A49.

== Services ==
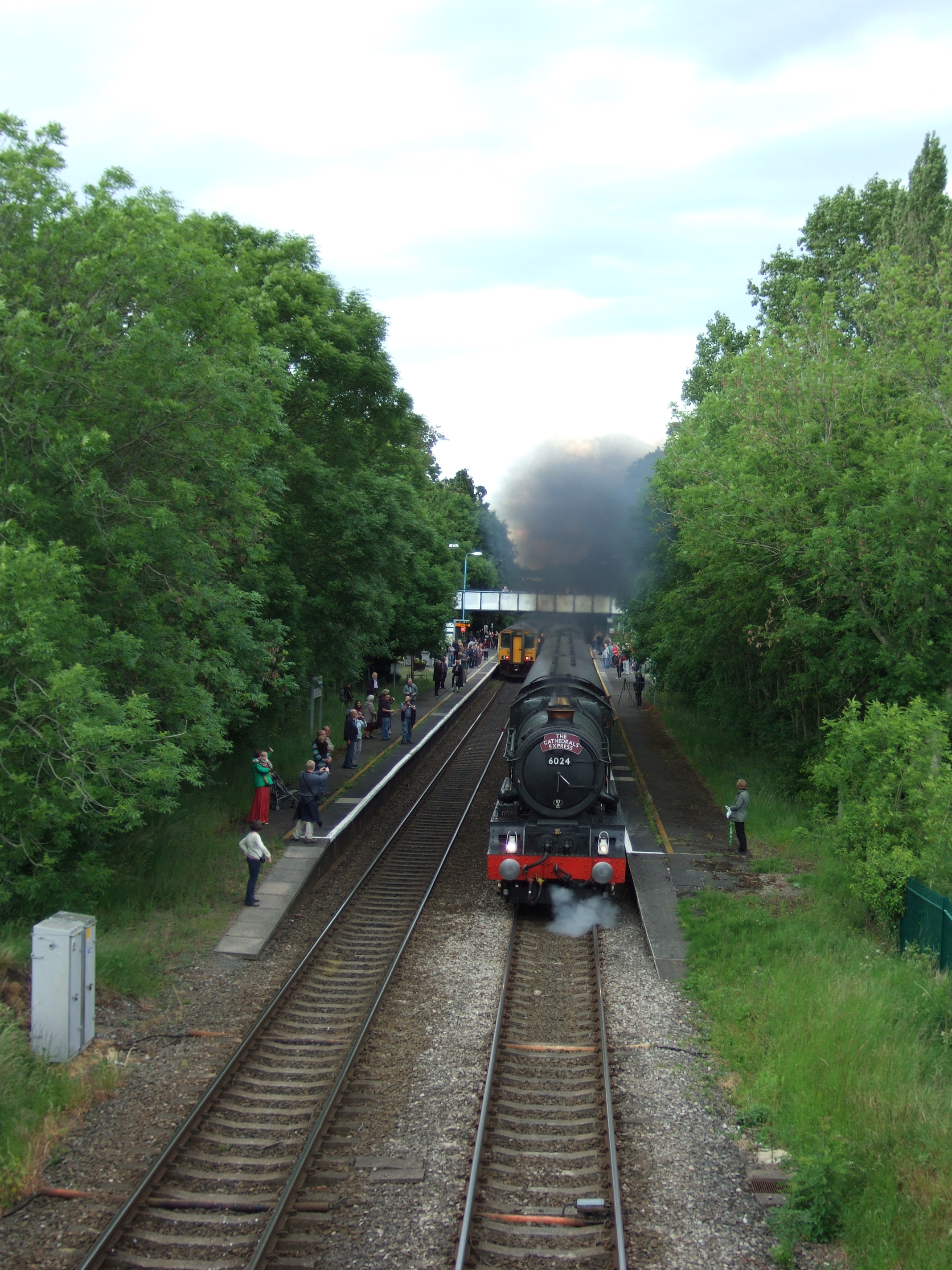
King Edward I steam charter train, passing a diesel multiple unit service

The general off-peak service in trains per hour is:

- 1 tp2h to Manchester Piccadilly, via Shrewsbury and Crewe
- 1 tp2h to Cardiff Central
- 1 tp2h to Carmarthen, via Cardiff Central and Swansea; some services continue to Fishguard Harbour, Milford Haven or Pembroke Dock
- 5 tpd to Holyhead.
- 5 tpd to Llanelli and Swansea via Llandrindod

Preceding station	National Rail	Following station
Craven Arms	Transport for Wales; Welsh Marches line	Shrewsbury
Craven Arms	Transport for Wales; Heart of Wales line	Shrewsbury
	Historical railways	
Little Stretton Halt; Line open, station closed	Shrewsbury and Hereford Railway	All Stretton Halt; Line open, station closed

== Passenger use ==
The station has a large number of passengers using it considering the town has a population of just 5,000 and is the eighth most-used station in Shropshire. The high usage can be explained by two reasons: the town is a popular tourist destination and many of its inhabitants travel to Shrewsbury and Ludlow for employment, education and shopping.

== Infrastructure ==
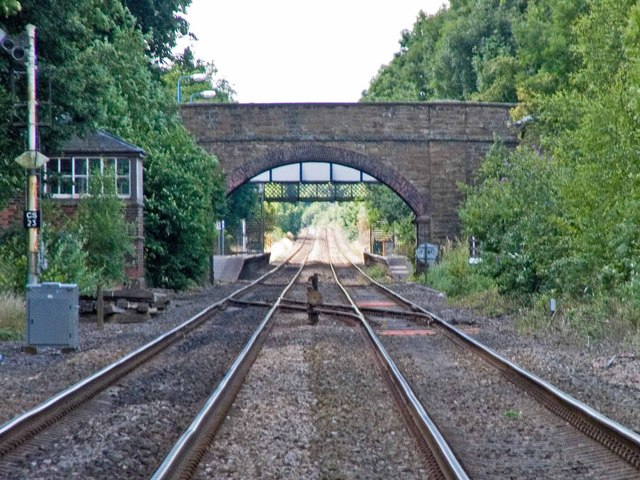
Looking south, showing the now removed signal box, signal and crossover, as well as the three (extant) bridges crossing the railway in the town.

The track through the station is prone to flooding when heavy rain occurs as, although at the apex of the line, it is at the bottom of the valley in which Church Stretton lies and is effectively a saddle point. In the wet autumn of 2000, the space between the two platforms filled with water and train services had to be cancelled along the line.

Following serious flooding of the railway in 2000, the signal box at Church Stretton, to the north of the Sandford Avenue bridge, was "switched out" and closed in 2004. The set of points at the station lay defunct before being removed in 2009, together with the box (built 1872) and all signals. Control of the line has been transferred to Marsh Brook signal box to the south.

== Volunteering ==
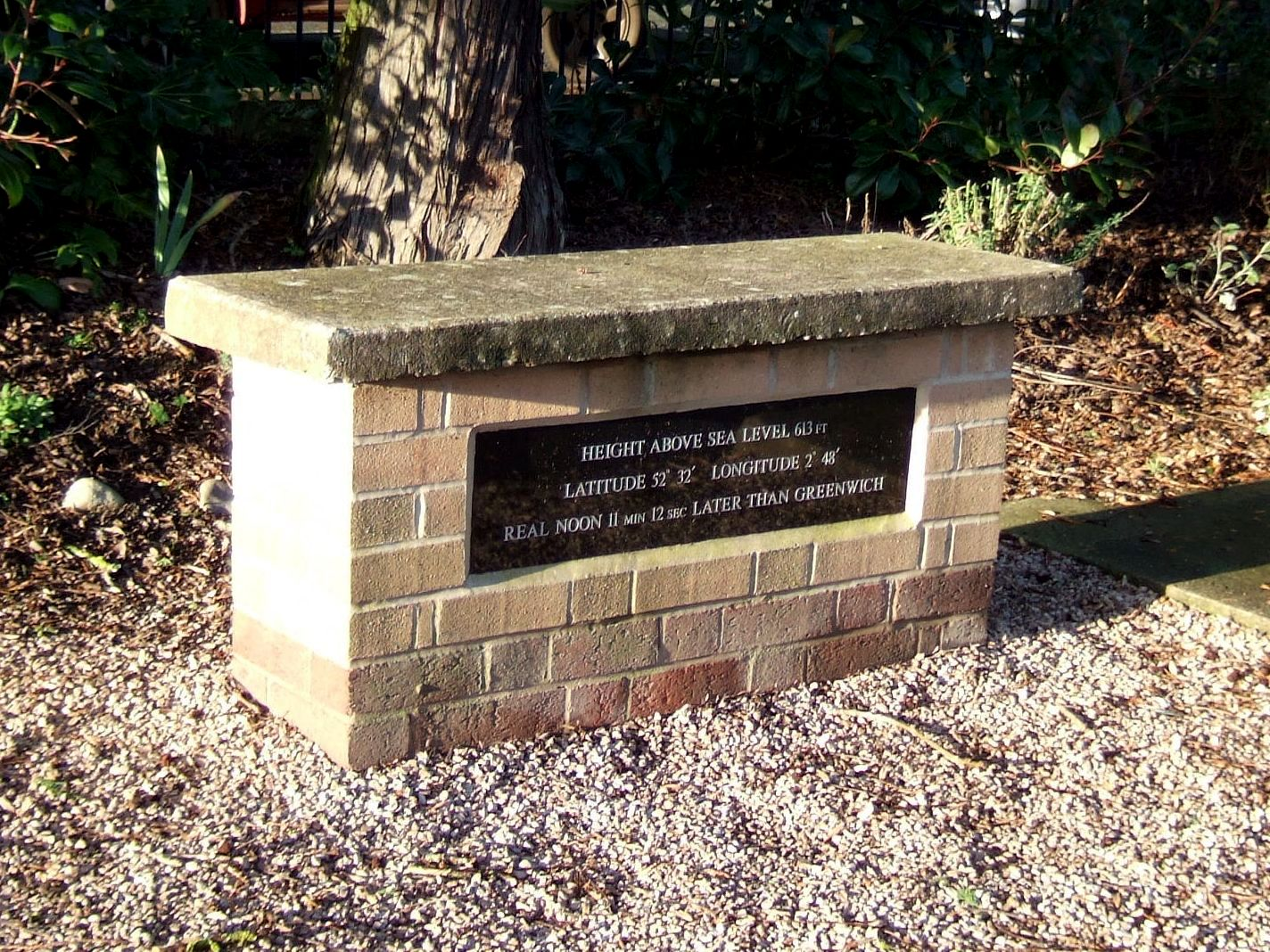
The plinth on platform 1

The station has been adopted by local volunteers who maintain it, including the garden areas behind both platforms. In 2008, a group of volunteers transformed the unattended station gardens and won the Station Gardens of the Year competition two years later. In 2011, a tree sculpture depicting two owls was carved by David Bytheway. There is also a Church Stretton Rail Users' Association. The main passenger footbridge connecting the two platforms was renovated and painted in 2013.

== Bus connections ==
The town is served by three bus routes:

- 435 between Shrewsbury and Ludlow, operated by Minsterley Motors; this connects the town with nearby villages including All Stretton, Dorrington, Leebotwood, Little Stretton and Marshbrook
- 580 between Shrewsbury and Cardington, also operated by Minsterley Motors
- 780 Long Mynd and Stiperstones Shuttle, operated by Boultons of Shropshire.

Bus services run to and from Beaumont Road, 300 yards (270 m) from the station. (Note: Location: grid reference SO454937)
