= All Stretton =

Village in Shropshire, England

Coordinates: 52.553°N 2.798°W

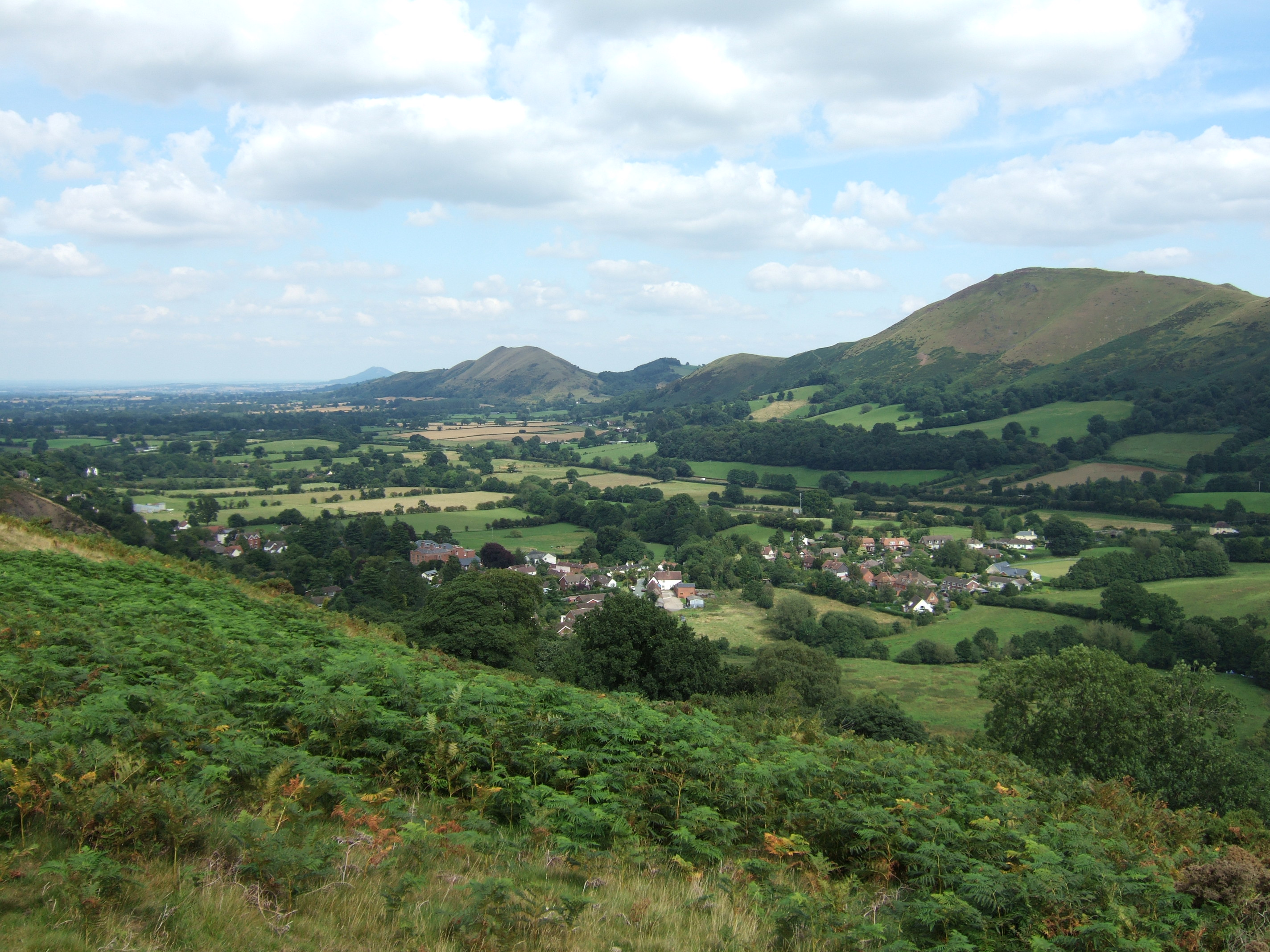
- All Stretton (and the north end of the Stretton Gap) viewed from Nover's Hill

- Location within Shropshire
- OS grid reference: SO459954
  - London: 158 miles (254 km)
- Civil parish: Church Stretton
- Unitary authority: Shropshire
- Ceremonial county: Shropshire
- Region: West Midlands
- Country: England
- Sovereign state: United Kingdom
- Post town: CHURCH STRETTON
- Postcode district: SY6
- Dialling code: 01694
- Police: West Mercia
- Fire: Shropshire
- Ambulance: West Midlands
- UK Parliament: South Shropshire

All Stretton is a village and a now separate civil parish in Shropshire, England. Much of it is covered by a Conservation Area.

== Geography ==
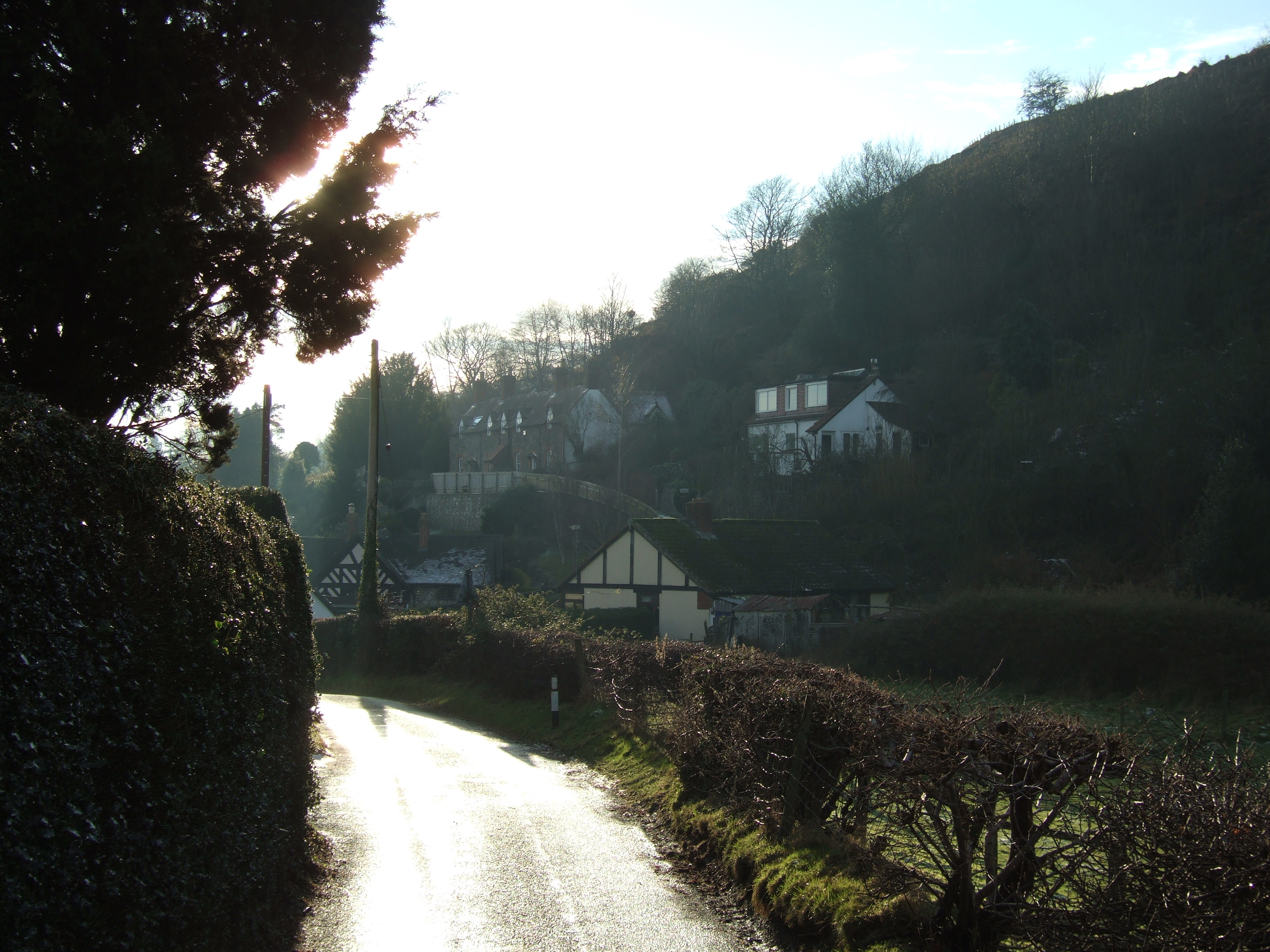
Coming down from Castle Hill

All Stretton lies about a mile to the north of the market town of Church Stretton, on the old Shrewsbury Road (the B5477) – Shrewsbury is 12 miles to the north. Similarly, the small village of Little Stretton lies to the south of Church Stretton on the same road. The village lies between 580 and 600 feet above sea level at the northern end of the Stretton Gap. The beginning of the Cound Brook, a minor river that runs 23 miles (35 km) across the southern Shropshire-Severn plains, is found in the village, where the stream from the Batch valley joins the Ashbrook. To the west of All Stretton is the Long Mynd, and to the east is Caer Caradoc.

The village does not lie in the parish of All Stretton, which is to its north, but in the civil parish of Church Stretton, which has a town council, of which All Stretton forms a parish ward. The southern part of the original parish, including the village, was transferred to the Church Stretton parish in 1934. The remaining parish of All Stretton is geographically small and has no well-defined settlements, only dispersed farms and houses, including Womerton and High Park. Its population was recorded as 120 at the 2011 census.

To the east of the village is the Welsh Marches Line railway and the major A49 road. Regional Cycle Route 32/33 passes through the village, on its way from Longnor to Church Stretton.

The historic hamlet of Botvyle lies within the Church Stretton parish and parish ward of All Stretton (grid reference SO475961). It is situated to the northeast of All Stretton, on the other side of the A49, on the lane to Comley. It takes its name from the forest that once covered the area, the "Botwood", as does the nearby village of Leebotwood.

== Governance ==
Prior to the creation of a unitary Shropshire Council in 2009, the village and the parish lay in different districts (South Shropshire and Shrewsbury and Atcham). Even under the new arrangements the village is in the electoral division of Church Stretton and Craven Arms, whilst the parish is in the division of Burnell. The village and parish lie in the constituency of South Shropshire.

== Facilities ==
All Stretton is the home to the Yew Tree Inn public house. The former Stretton Hall Hotel, located in the centre of the village opposite the Yew Tree Inn, underwent redevelopment into a nursing home in 2008/2009; before that it had held a pub licence since 1976. There was once another pub in the village – the White Horse – but this is now a house, although a small pub sign still hangs outside. The village hall is used for a wide variety of local events including amateur theatre productions by the All Stretton Amateur Dramatics Society and cinema sittings with 'Flicks in the Sticks'. It also hosts the Women's Institutes meetings.

There is a small church in the village, built in 1902 and dedicated to St Michael and All Angels. It is a joint Church of England and United Reformed Church, and serves as one of three churches in the Church of England's ecclesiastical parish of Church Stretton, along with those in Church Stretton and Little Stretton. The ecclesiastical parish is part of the Diocese of Hereford. The church stands at the northern end of the village, on a hillside rising steeply from Shrewsbury Road. The church has a Roll of Honour naming the parish dead of both World Wars, and wooden panelling that includes the door to the vestry, in memory of a former curate, John Charles Bartleet, who died on active service as an army chaplain in Palestine in 1942.

The village's outdoor roadside war memorial, in the form of a stone obelisk, was unveiled in 1920 and restored to commemorate the 50th anniversary of the end of World War II in 1995, when the weathered names from both World Wars were reinstated on slate plaques.

The village has an entrance to the Batch Valley, which leads on to the Long Mynd and adjoins the head of Carding Mill Valley. A YHA bunkhouse, which provides accommodation for up to 12 people, is located in the Batch Valley. From the Batch Valley the Church Stretton Golf Club's golf course, which is situated at around 380 yards, can be accessed by foot.

The village also boasts a traditional red telephone box, which sits at the bottom of Castle Hill and is still functioning. The village for a long time had a post office but this closed in 2008. As of 2010, there are approximately 150 dwellings in the village.

== Etymology ==
The name "Stretton" is derived from the Old English words stræt meaning "Roman road" and tun meaning "settlement". The affix "All" derives from an early owner called Alfred, rather than from a supposed comment made by King James I of England. The local tale describes how he passed first through Little Stretton, then Church Stretton and finally as he came through All Stretton the king declared "They're All Strettons around here!"

== History ==
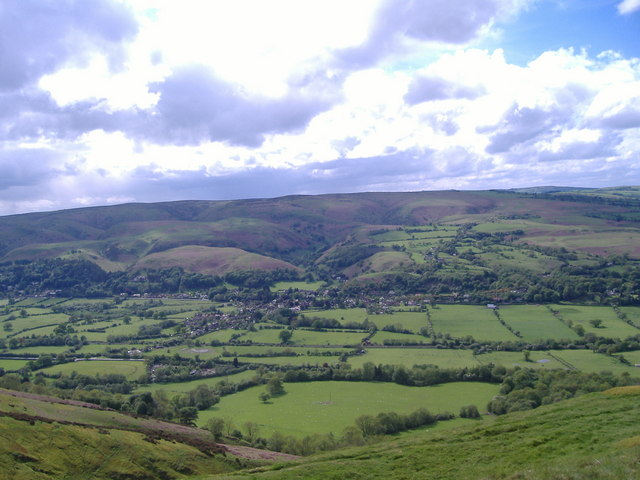
All Stretton from Caer Caradoc

There is a conservation-area designation covering much of the village. There are 6 Listed buildings and structures in the village.

A history group in All Stretton published a history of the village in 2006. A prominent children's book writer who regularly visited her sister Anne's house in the village, Caradoc Lodge, was Hesba Stretton (1832–1911).

=== Railway ===
The Shrewsbury and Hereford Railway was constructed through the area in 1852. All Stretton once had its own railway halt: All Stretton Halt railway station. The nearest railway station is now at Church Stretton.

== See also ==
- Listed buildings in All Stretton
