= Red Pottage =

Red Pottage may refer to:

- Red Pottage (novel), an 1899 British novel by Mary Cholmondeley
- Red Pottage (film), a 1918 British film adaptation directed by Meyrick Milton
