= Condover =

Village and civil parish in Shropshire, England

Coordinates: 52.648°N 2.75°W

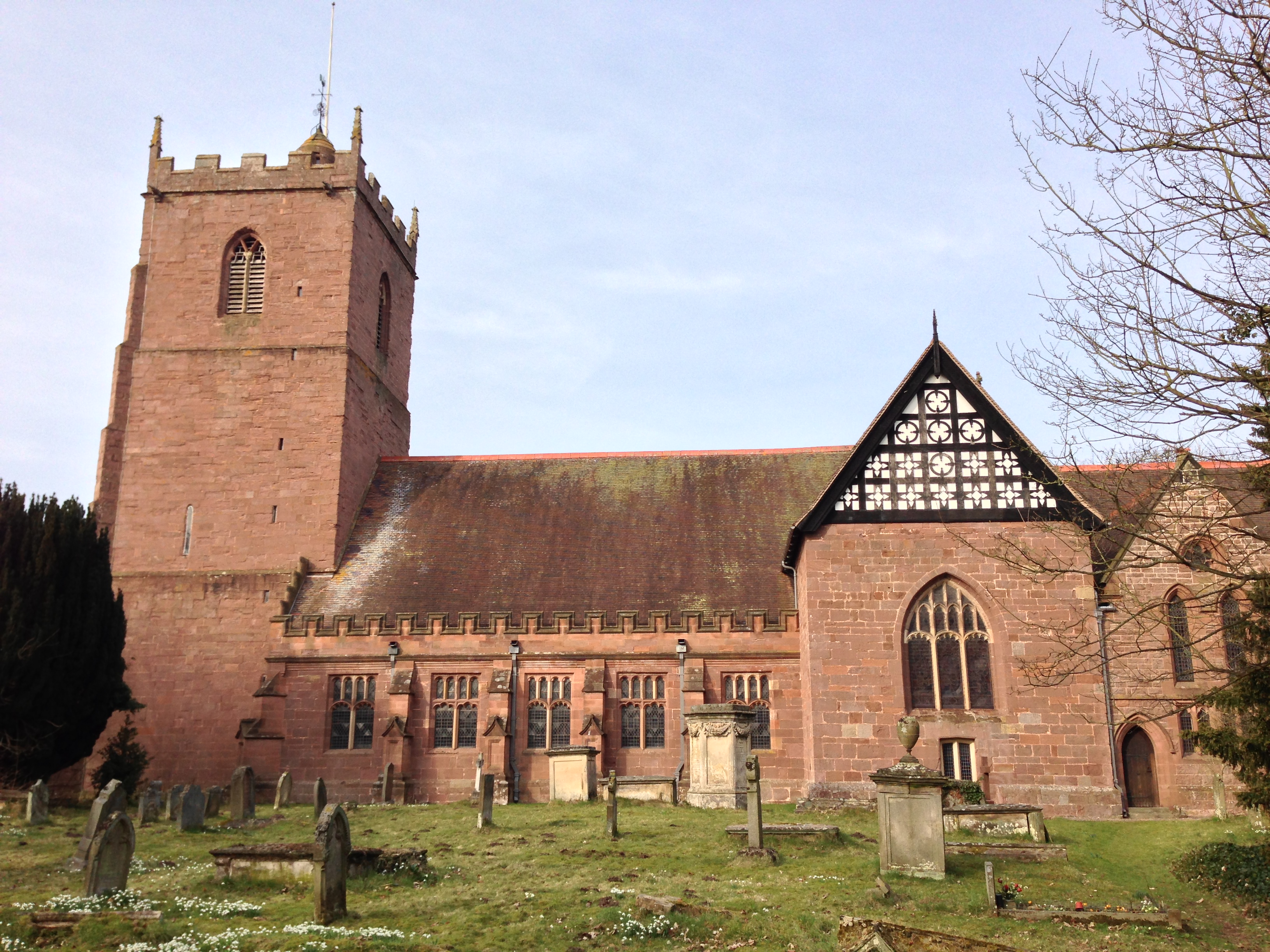
- SS Mary & Andrew parish church, viewed from the south

- Location within Shropshire
- Population: 1,957 (2011)
- OS grid reference: SJ4906
- Civil parish: Condover
- Unitary authority: Shropshire
- Ceremonial county: Shropshire
- Region: West Midlands
- Country: England
- Sovereign state: United Kingdom
- Post town: Shrewsbury
- Postcode district: SY5
- Dialling code: 01743
- Police: West Mercia
- Fire: Shropshire
- Ambulance: West Midlands
- UK Parliament: Shrewsbury
- Website: Condover parish council

Condover is a village and civil parish in Shropshire, England. It is about 5 miles (8 km) south of the county town of Shrewsbury, and just east of the A49. The Cound Brook flows through the village on its way from the Stretton Hills to a confluence with the River Severn. Condover is near to the villages of Dorrington, Bayston Hill and Berrington. The population of the Condover parish was estimated as 1,972 for 2008, of which an estimated 659 live in the village of Condover itself. The actual population measured at the 2011 census had fallen to 1,957.

Condover contains a higher than normal proportion of listed buildings and over half of the village has been classified as a conservation area since 1976. The more than forty listed structures in Condover range from six separate early cruck-framed buildings and many black-and-white timbered cottages to the 19th-century Old Vicarage and several funerary monuments in the churchyard. Of the early half-timbered houses, the most impressive are Church House, the Old School House and the Small House that is now known as Condover Court.

The parish contains two industrial estates, two sand and gravel quarries and a projected borough recycling plant is currently planned and under discussion.

== History ==
=== Medieval beginnings ===
In the Anglo-Saxon era between 613 and 1017 the village was the principal settlement in the Hundred of Condover, an administrative area that was large enough to sustain about 100 households. By the 11th century Condover was a royal manor of King Edward the Confessor. It formed a significant part of the great royal forest known as the Long Forest, which stretched almost the full length of South Shropshire.

The Domesday Book of 1086 records it as Conendovre, and the Norman manor house is believed to have stood on the site now occupied by Church House, a short distance north west of the Church. It would also appear that there was a mill on the Cound Brook in the village which produced a good annual income. At the time of the Domesday census, Condover was held by Roger de Montgomerie, 1st Earl of Shrewsbury, who had been granted seven-eighths of Shropshire by his cousin William I in 1071. The revenues of the manor were later forfeited by Robert de Bellême, Earl Roger's next but one successor, and returned to Royal hands under Henry I. As with other royal manors, the affairs of Condover were managed by the local Shire reeve or sheriff, whose duty it was to keep the King's forest and manor well stocked and maintained.

In 1226, Henry III visited Shrewsbury to meet his brother-in-law, Prince Llewelyn ap Gruffyd of Wales. Henry offered Condover to Llewelyn as a goodwill gesture, but sustained wars and skirmishes between England and Wales throughout the 13th century ensured that stable tenure of Condover manor and Hundred did not settle for nearly 300 years.

=== Later history ===
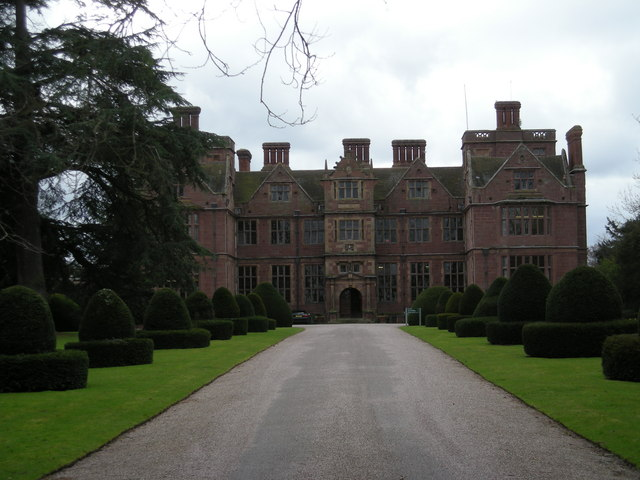
Condover hall from the front driveway

The Royal manor passed in and out of Crown tenure until the reign of Elizabeth I when it was sold to the Vynar family. In turn the Condover manor lands were purchased in 1586 by Chief Justice Thomas Owen, a member of parliament and Recorder of Shrewsbury. Owen began the building of the current Condover Hall but died before its completion. The hall remained in the Owen family and its descendants for over 300 years. John Marius Wilson's Imperial Gazetteer of England and Wales of 1870–72 describes Condover:

"CONDOVER, a village, a parish, a sub-district, and a hundred, in Salop. The village stands on an affluent of the river Severn, adjacent to the Shrewsbury and Hereford Railway, 4½ miles S[outh] of Shrewsbury; and has a station on the railway, and a post office under Shrewsbury. The parish includes also the villages of Chatford and Dorrington. Acres, 7,422. Real property, £14,431. Pop[ulation]., 1,871. Houses, 376. The property is subdivided. Condover House [sic- Hall] is the seat of E. W. S. Owen, Esq[uire].; and was built, about 1590, by Chief Justice Owen. The living is a vicarage in the diocese of Lichfield. Value, £258.* Patron, R. Cholmondely, Esq. The church is chiefly Norman; contains monuments of the Owens, one of them by Roubiliac; and is good. The p[erpetual]. curacy of Dorrington is a separate benefice. Charities, £66. -The sub-district is in Atcham district; and contains fourteen parishes. Acres, 37,057. Pop., 6,063. Houses, 1,157. -The hundred includes most of the sub-district; extends considerably beyond it; and is cut into the divisions of Condover and Cound. Acres, 25,630 and 19,684. Pop[ulation]. of the whole, 6,551. Houses, 1,261."

In 1930 GWR 4900 Class steam locomotive No. 4915 was built and named Condover Hall. It was in regular service until British Railways withdrew it 1965. In the 1980s Hornby Railways produced an electric model of the engine.

=== Second World War ===
RAF Condover was opened in August 1942 and was used variously as a fighter, bomber and a training base during the Second World War, closing in June 1945. Many of the original buildings including the control tower still stand although most of the three concrete runways have been removed. RAF Condover now forms a major part of Berriewood Farm and Condover Industrial Estate. Condover Hall was commandeered as the station's officers' mess during the station's operational years.

Between the latter years of the war and the autumn of 1947 Condover was the site of a Prisoner of War (POW) camp for German airmen, who were employed as farm labourers in the local area. The prisoners were housed in the former WAAF accommodation huts at RAF Condover. Several of the POWs settled permanently in the Shrewsbury area and married local women.

=== Residential school ===
The Elizabethan manor house in Condover, Condover Hall, was sold to and operated by the RNIB as the residential Condover Hall School for the Blind until 2005. Sold to the private Priory Educational Group, the hall later became home to Condover Horizon School for autistic children. The Priory Group closed the school and college in mid-2009 and the property was again offered for sale.

In 2011 JCA Adventure bought the house, and it now hosts children's residential adventure holidays.

=== Condover in the media ===
The lanes, footpaths and woodlands around Condover and Bomere Pool featured in several of the medieval detective novels about Brother Cadfael by novelist Ellis Peters.

In 1988 the BBC filmed a three-part documentary about the RNIB residential school at Condover Hall, and the children were filmed extensively in and around the village.

== Governance ==
=== Historical ===
Condover originally formed a principal part of the ancient Hundred of Condover.

=== Parish Council ===
There are 12 parish councillors representing Condover, which is a warded parish:

- Condover Ward is represented by five parish councillors
- Dorrington Ward is represented by four parish councillors
- Ryton Ward is represented by one parish councillor
- Stapleton Ward is represented by two parish councillors

=== County ===
The parish, along with a number of others to its south, is part of the Burnell electoral division, which returns one councillor to Shropshire Council.

=== Westminster ===
The parish is part of the Shrewsbury parliamentary constituency, and the member of parliament since 2024 is Julia Buckley of the Labour Party.

== Demographics ==
=== Historical ===
In the 1801 census Condover's total population was 1,251. In 1901 it was 1,658 and by 1971 the population had fallen to 1,488. It was estimated as 1,972 for 2008, of which an estimated 659 lived in the village of Condover itself.

=== Current ===
The population of the Condover parish was recorded at the 2011 census as 1,957, a decrease on 2008.

== Geography ==
The village lies just four miles south of Shrewsbury and is separated from the county town by the main A5 trunk road. It has good road transport links with easy access to both the A49 and A5. To the west lies the Pre-Cambrian Lyth Hill, with Sharpstone Hill standing to the north, the latter now mostly a major sandstone quarry with little of the hill now remaining after several hundred years of constant quarrying activities.

=== Waterway ===
The village of Condover is in a low-lying area, towards the southern end of the Shropshire-Severn plain. The gently undulating land in the vicinity is bisected by Cound Brook, an important local tributary of the River Severn, which rises in the Stretton Hills some seven miles to the south west.

=== Geology ===
Condover stands in the lee of an outcropping spur, consisting of a Pre-Cambrian limestone and sandstone sedimentary rock extension of the Longmyndian range, intruding into the Shropshire-Severn plain with major appearances at Longden, Lyth Hill, Bayston Hill, and Sharpstone Hill. North of the River Severn it does not outcrop again until it appears east of Shrewsbury as Haughmond Hill. The sediments were laid down under a vast warm ocean, surrounded by many volcanoes that were ground down by later Ice Age glaciers which provided the fertile soil that contributed to Condover becoming a successful farming community throughout medieval times. There are still several active geological fault lines underlying the area and on 2 April 1990 Condover experienced an earthquake, measuring 5.4 on the Richter Scale, centred on Bishop's Castle on the Welsh border.

=== Sandstone quarrying and gravel sink holes ===
There are many small sand and gravel quarries located around the village, although the area is still very rural. In one of the many gravel bog sink holes near Bomere Pool the bones of a woolly mammoth were discovered in 1986. The skeleton is one of the most complete mammoth skeletons ever to be found in the UK and has been dated at 14,000 years old, later than the animals had been previously thought to survive in Europe. There is a model of the Condover mammoth skeleton at the Shropshire Hills Discovery Centre in Craven Arms, along with a reconstruction of how it might have lived. Next to Bomere Pool is a secluded traditional forest of about 125 acres (51 ha), woodland that once formed part of Bayston Hill and Condover royal forest.

== Transport ==
=== Bus route ===
Minsterley Motors route 435 (Shrewsbury-Ludlow) runs through and calls at the village.

=== Cycle route ===
Regional Cycle Route 32/33 passes through the village, on its way from Betton Strange to Great Ryton.

== Railways ==
The Welsh Marches line runs through the currently closed Condover railway station on the section without any intermediate stations between Shrewsbury railway station and Church Stretton railway station.

== Education ==
=== Primary ===
The village has its own primary school, Condover Primary School, a Church of England co-educational school with 109 pupils aged 5–11.

=== Secondary ===
There is no secondary school in the village; children over the age of eleven travel by bus to a range of secondary schools in nearby Meole Brace, Shrewsbury or Church Stretton and the sixth-form college in Shrewsbury.

== Parish church ==
The Church of England parish church of SS Andrew and Mary dates from the 12th century and is cruciform. The late Norman windows have keeled nook-shafts and waterleaf capitals, resting on a continuous string course. The church is built of finely grained local pink sandstone, quarried at Berriewood, with some recycled Roman stones, presumably robbed from a local derelict farmhouse or villa.

The replacement nave dates from 1664 after the rebuilding of the crossing tower, which collapsed on 22 November 1660 also destroying the northern aisle. A master mason called John Orum cut his initials (reading apparently "I.O.") into the northern jamb of the double-chamfered tower arch in 1664. The three-stage western tower was added in 1678 but has a medieval appearance. The chancel was rebuilt in 1868 by Lord of the Manor, Reginald Cholmondeley of Condover Hall who also added the northern family chapel, which contains a range of monuments, earliest of which is the memorial (dated 1641), with kneeling figures, of Judge Owen, his son Sir Roger, daughter Jane Norton. and her husband Bonham Norton.

The northern porch, south vestry together with battlements and buttresses to the nave were built during an 1878 restoration by Fairfax Blomfield Wade-Palmer. Stained-glass windows were added in 1868, in 1881 and latterly in 1905 with a four pane Infancy of Christ by J.H. Powell.

The church contains one of the finest collections of church monuments in Shropshire, the earliest from the 16th century. Most of the churchyard monuments and family tombs date from the 18th and 19th centuries and many of the sculptures and monuments are listed.

There are a few war-related memorials:

- Brass plaque (north wall) to Private John Beddall, King's Shropshire Light Infantry, died on active service in South Africa during Boer War in 1901.
- Portland stone tablet on north-east wall of nave to "the eighteen (sic) men" of the parish who died serving in First World War – the names listed include one woman, Katherine Harley (nurse, killed in Salonika).
- Brass plaque (north wall) to Flight Lieutenant Eric Lock DSO DFC & Bar RAF (1919–1941), who failed to return from operations on 3 August 1941.
- A Second World War Roll of Honour at the front of the church

The churchyard contains a Commonwealth war grave headstone to a Royal Warwickshire Regiment soldier of the First World War.

The parish church, previously in the Diocese of Lichfield, is now part of the Diocese of Hereford.

== Sports ==
- Shrewsbury Motocross Club holds six meets each year at Condover
- Shrewsbury Golf Club, established in 1891, now has its main 18-hole golf course at Condover, which opened in 1971.
- Condover Cricket Club plays in the Shropshire Cricket League
- Condover Football Club plays in the Shrewsbury Sunday League

== Notable people ==
- Richard Tarlton (c. 1530–1588), actor and court jester on whom the Shakespearian character of Yorick is thought to have been based, was born at Condover.
- Thomas Owen (died 1598), judge and politician, who bought Condover manor in 1586 and built Condover Hall, completed year of his death.
- Sir Roger Owen (1573–1617), politician, son of latter, first of his family to occupy Condover Hall, buried at Condover church.
- Henry Sacheverell (1674–1724), the divine, stayed at Condover Hall as a guest of another Roger Owen, during the Progress he made in the summer of 1710 following the end of his political trial.
- Robert Clive ("Clive of India") (1725–1774), is believed to have been a tenant at Condover Hall when two of his daughters, Margaret ("Margaretta" in the registers) and Elizabeth were baptised at Condover Church respectively in 1763 and 1764. After the entry of Elizabeth's baptism, coinciding with Clive's last voyage to India, was written in the register a prayer verse: "An Aged Sire's longing Eyes to feast/And fill with Rapture his Clarinda's Breast/From Indostan unto his native shore/With Laurels crown'd may CLIVE as heretofore/Return, Thou King of Heaven, we implore."
- Charles Burney (1726–1814), musicologist, was brought up at Condover until 1739 in care of a woman, "Nurse Ball".
- Thomas Corser (1793–1876) was a British literary scholar and Church of England clergyman. He was the editor of Collectanea Anglo-Poetica and was curate of Condover 1816–19.
- Reginald Cholmondeley (1826-1896), artist and art collector, owned Condover Hall from 1864 until his death and is buried in the churchyard. As well as remodelling the Hall with work of his own, he also built the Church of England village school and paid for restoration and extension work at Condover church.
- Edmund Hegan Kennard (1834-1912), Conservative politician, rented Condover Hall for three years during the 1870s.
- The famous American author Samuel Langhorne Clemens (1835–1910), whose pen name was Mark Twain, holidayed at Condover Hall, in 1873 and 1879.
- Katherine Harley (suffragist) (1855-killed in World War I 1917), lived during her marriage at Condover House and is commemorated in Condover Church.
- Edward Brocklehurst Fielden (1857–1942), businessman and Conservative politician, was owner-occupier of Condover Hall 1897-1926.
- The novelist Mary Cholmondeley (1859–1925) lived briefly at Condover Hall in 1896 before her family left and sold the estate.
- World War II fighter-pilot Flight Lieutenant Eric Lock DSO DFC & Bar RAF (1919–1941), member of a Condover parish farming family, has a brass plaque to his memory in Condover Church.

== See also ==
- Listed buildings in Condover
- Bomere Pool
- Cantlop Bridge
- Condover railway station
- Cound Brook
- RAF Condover
