= RAF Atcham =

Royal Air Force station in England, 1941–1946

RAF Atcham USAAF Station 342
- Near Shrewsbury, Shropshire in England
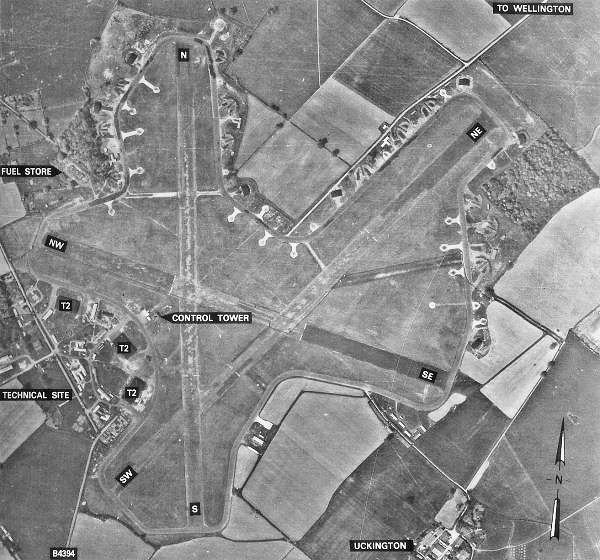
- Atcham Airfield – 9 May 1946

Site information
- Type: Royal Air Force station
- Code: AP
- Owner: Air Ministry
- Operator: Royal Air Force; United States Army Air Forces (1942-45)
- Controlled by: RAF Fighter Command (1941–1942) * No. 9 Group RAF; Eighth Air Force (1942–1944); Ninth Air Force (1944–1945); RAF Flying Training Command (1945–1946)

Location
- Shown within Shropshire RAF Atcham (the United Kingdom)
- Coordinates: 52°41′25″N 002°38′16″W

Site history
- Built: 1941
- In use: September 1941 – April 1946
- Battles/wars: European theatre of World War II

Airfield information
- Elevation: 200 feet (61 m) AMSL
Runways
Direction	Length and surface
05/23	1,825 metres (5,988 ft) Asphalt
18/36	1,825 metres (5,988 ft) Asphalt
10/28	1,280 metres (4,199 ft) Asphalt

Royal Air Force Atcham or more simply RAF Atcham is a former Royal Air Force station located 5 miles (8 km) east of Shrewsbury, Shropshire, England, on the north eastern boundary of Attingham Park.

Initially built for RAF Fighter Command, during the Second World War its primary use was by the United States Army Air Forces (USAAF) Eighth Air Force. It was mainly the home of the 495th Fighter Training Group, where pilots were trained to fly Republic P-47 Thunderbolts although a few also were trained to fly twin-engined Lockheed P-38 Lightnings for both Eighth and Ninth Air Force units. Atcham continued to see use as a training base until it was returned to the RAF in March 1945.

== History ==
=== Royal Air Force ===
The airfield was opened in 1941 and was initially used by the Royal Air Force to house two squadrons of RAF Fighter Command with the first to arrive being 131 Squadron on 27 September 1941 with Supermarine Spitfires

It was planned to open RAF Condover as a satellite station but when it opened in 1942 the RAF had decided to hand over the Atcham site for American use.

=== United States Army Air Forces use ===
To support the USAAF, jurisdiction of Atcham Airfield was transferred from RAF Fighter Command to the USAAF on 15 June 1942 when a number of RAF stations were turned over to the Americans. It was designated as Station 342 (AP).

USAAF Station Units assigned to RAF Atcham were:

- 333d Service Group (VIII Air Force Composite Command)

332d Service Squadron; HHS, 333d Service Group

- 42d Service Group (VIII Air Force Composite Command)

356th, 361st Service Squadrons; HHS 42d Service Group

- 18th Weather Squadron

Regular Army Station Units included:

- 1004th Signal Company
- 1148th Quartermaster Company
- 1761st Ordnance Supply & Maintenance Company
- 2020th Engineer Fire Fighting Platoon
- 182nd Medical Dispensary

==== Fighter Training ====
The 6th Fighter Wing was the original training organisation established on 27 August 1942, under the control of VIII Fighter Command. During 1942 and early 1943, it trained pilots in combat operations as well as air-to-air-gunnery with the attached 1st Gunnery & Tow Target Flight. The training was conducted using Supermarine Spitfies and pilots drawn from the 67th Observation Group at RAF Membury (AAF-466) and RAF Middle Wallop (AAF-449).

The 6th Fighter Wing provided training to the following groups:

31st Fighter Group

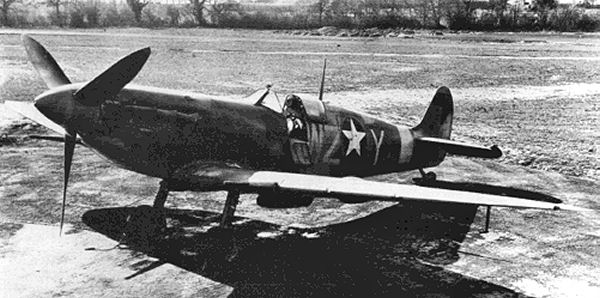
Spitfire V of the 309th Fighter Squadron

It consisted of the 307th, 308th and 309th Fighter Squadrons.

The group arrived without assigned aircraft as its Bell P-39 Airacobras were found unsuitable for long-distance formation ferry flights. Provided with British Supermarine Spitfires by the Royal Air Force (RAF), the 31st FG entered combat in August and supported a raid made by Canadian, British, American, and French forces at Dieppe on 19 August. The group also escorted bombers and flew patrol and diversionary missions.

After its training was completed in August 1942, the 31st moved to RAF Westhampnett in Sussex before moving into Tafaraoui Airfield, Oran, Algeria on 8 November 1942 as part of Twelfth Air Force.

14th Fighter Group

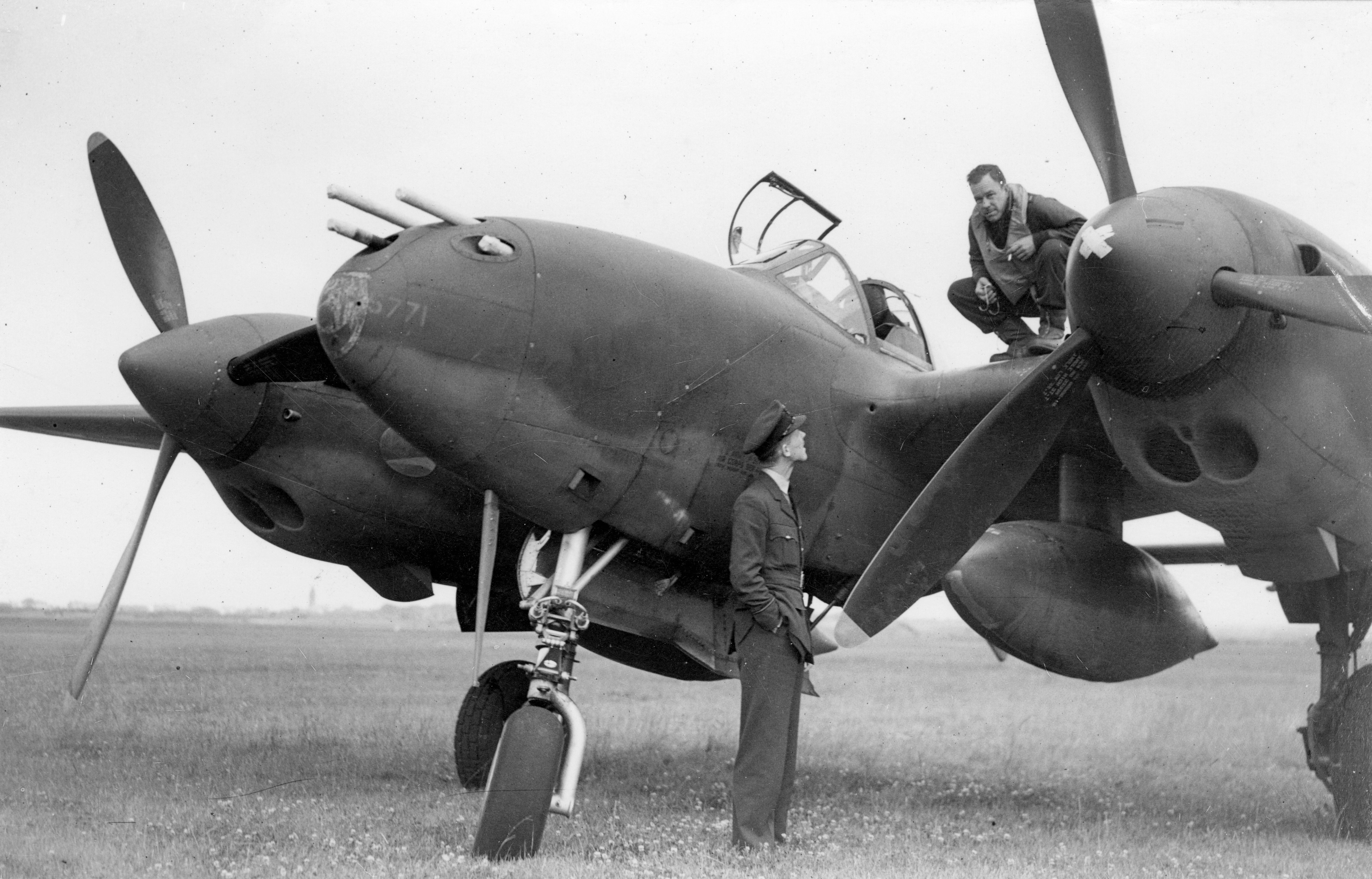
An RAF airman talks to a pilot of the 14th Fighter Group on the wing of his P-38 Lightning at Atcham, England.

The 14th arrived at Atcham on 18 August 1942 from Hamilton Field, California. It consisted of the 48th (ES) and 49th Fighter Squadrons (QU).

Equipped with Lockheed P-38 Lightnings, the 14th escorted Boeing B-17 Flying Fortress and Consolidated B-24 Liberator bombers to targets in France. In addition, fourteen P-38s of the 48th Squadron were sent on detached service to RAF Westhampnett and RAF Ford in southern England, where in co-ordination with British squadrons, the pilots engaged in a number of practice sweeps across the English Channel.

After flying sweep sorties during which there was no contact with the Luftwaffe, in November 1942 the 14th was reassigned to the Twelfth Air Force, and was transferred to Tafaraoui Airfield, Oran, Algeria in the Mediterranean Theater of Operations (MTO) after the Operation Torch landings in North Africa.

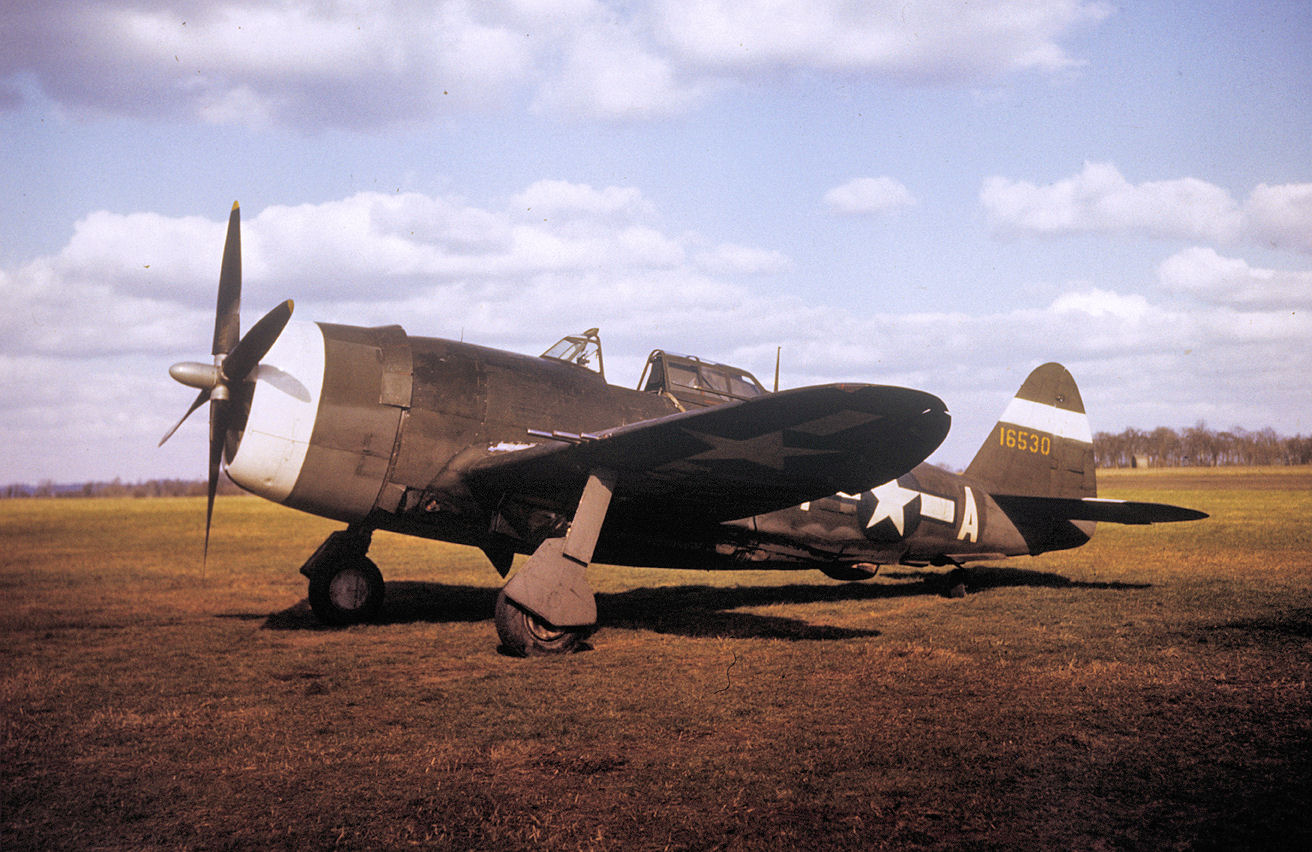
Republic P-47C-5-RE Thunderbolt Serial 41-6530 of the 551st Fighter Training Squadron. This aircraft was formerly assigned to the 56th Fighter Group at RAF Kings Cliffe. This aircraft was condemned due to enemy action 16 April 1946

The 6th Wing was discontinued on 13 September 1943. Its place was taken by a provisional unit, the 2906th Observation Training Group (Fighter), which had been organized on 16 August. The 2906th was replaced in turn by a regular unit, the 495th Fighter Training Group on 26 October 1943. The 495th switched its mission to a Replacement Training Group (RTU) and was assigned two RTU squadrons:

- 551st Fighter Training Squadron (VM)
- 552d Fighter Training Squadron (DQ)

As a Combat Crew Replacement Center, the squadrons flew a mixture of hand-me-down aircraft, primarily planes which were considered not combat-ready to high hours and being "war weary". It flew Republic P-47C Thunderbolts, some Lockheed P-38H Lightnings, and Douglas A-20 Havocs. Pilots trained were then assigned to both VIII Fighter Command and IX Fighter Command after completion of training for subsequent assignment to units as needed.

The 495 FTG stayed until February 1945, moving to RAF Cheddington. From August 1944 the Ninth AF P-38s from the 496 FTG/554 FTS from RAF Goxhill used Atcham as a training field.

=== Back to Royal Air Force control ===
Atcham was returned to the RAF Flying Training Command on 14 March 1945 becoming a satellite of RAF Ternhill. No. 5 (Pilots) Advanced Flying Unit RAF ((P)AFU) and No. 6 Service Flying Training School RAF (SFTS). No. 577 Squadron RAF target towing with Airspeed Oxfords, Spitfires and Vultee Vengeances used the airfield until the end of the war.

The site was also used by No. 2815 Squadron RAF Regiment and No. 2820 Squadron RAF Regiment

Atcham was abandoned on 22 October 1946 and disposed of on 20 January 1958.

== Current use ==
With the end of military control, Atcham airfield was returned to farmland with the runways being broken up and removed and the control tower demolished.

Today there is little evidence of Atcham airfield. Some minor agricultural roads which were part of the perimeter track remain as access to farm fields, and the B4394 uses part of the former South West to North East runway. The three Callender Hamilton hangars of the former technical site remain together in use with all the administration buildings, the whole complex forming the Atcham Industrial Estate northwest of the former airfield area.

== Major units assigned ==
Royal Air Force

- 131 Squadron (27 September 1941 – 8 February 1942)
- 350 (Belgian) Squadron (19 February – 5 April 1942)
- 74 Squadron (24 March – 10 April 1942)
- 232 Squadron (10 April – 15 May 1942)
- 452 Squadron (June 1942)

United States Army Air Forces

- 495th Fighter Training Group (27 August 1942 – February 1945)
- 31st Fighter Group (11 June – 1 August 1942)
- 14th Fighter Group (18 August – November 1942)

== See also ==
- List of former Royal Air Force stations
