= Condover Hall =

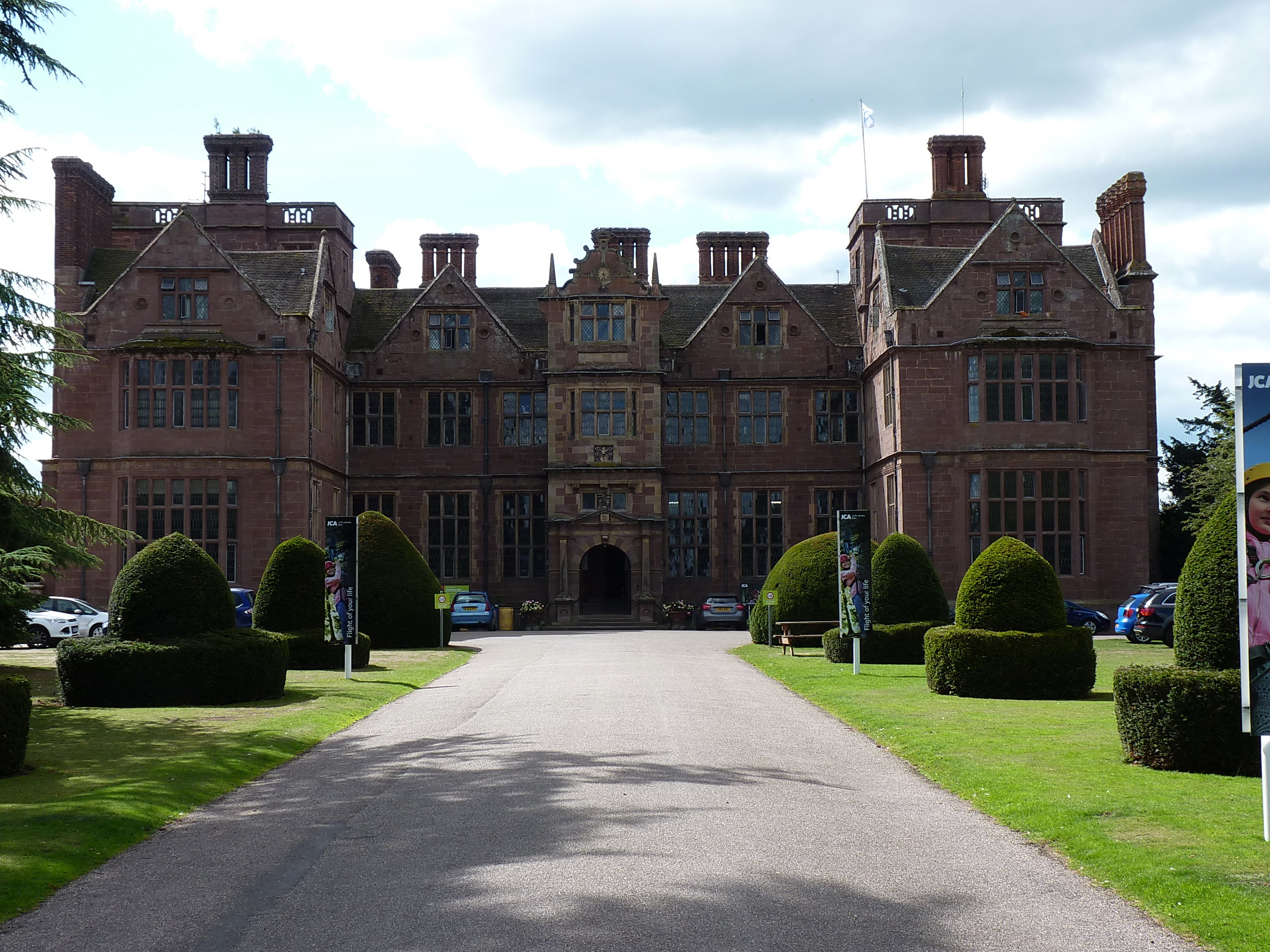
- North elevation of Condover Hall

- Location within Shropshire

General information
- Architectural style: Elizabethan
- Location: Condover, Shropshire, United Kingdom
- Coordinates: 52°38′47″N 02°44′52″W

Listed Building – Grade I
- Official name: Condover Hall
- Designated: 3 November 1955
- Reference no.: 1055706

National Register of Historic Parks and Gardens
- Official name: Condover Hall
- Designated: 3 November 1955
- Reference no.: 1001118
- Grade: II

Condover Hall is a Grade I listed three-storey Elizabethan sandstone building, described as the grandest manor house in Shropshire, standing in a conservation area on the outskirts of Condover village, Shropshire, England, four miles south of the county town of Shrewsbury.

A Royal manor in Anglo Saxon times, until the 16th century Condover Manor was in and out of Crown Tenure. In 1586 it was purchased by Thomas Owen, a Member of Parliament for, and Recorder of, Shrewsbury, from the family of the previous owner, Henry Vynar, a London merchant who had died in 1585. Owen had had a lease of the manor from 1578, and been in lawsuit with the family.

For over sixty years from 1946 the hall was run as a residential school, initially for blind children when owned by the RNIB and latterly under private ownership as a school for autistic children, covering boy boarders and coeducational day pupils. The school and college both closed during 2009. The house has subsequently been re-opened as an activity centre.

== Construction ==
Owen died in 1598 before the new hall was completed and its designer remains a matter of debate. Building accounts record that a John Richmond of Acton Reynald was the original master mason, but by 1591 Walter Hancock had taken over the position. Lawrence Shipway, the builder of the second (not current) Shire Hall at Stafford, also appears to have had some major contribution to the building design. The most compelling evidence can be found in drawings in the Sir John Soane's Museum that seems to prove that the hall was designed by the Elizabethan architect John Thorpe in the early 1590s.

Another Shropshire landowner, Francis Newport employed Walter Hancock in his building projects, and on 11 November 1595 he wrote from High Ercall to the town council of Shrewsbury, recommending Hancock be employed to build a new market hall. He said that Mr Justice Owen would have made the same recommendation, if he were in the county at the time.

Built out of pink sandstone, quarried at nearby Berriewood, Condover Hall has typical Elizabethan two-storey ground-floor rooms lit by tall windows with regular mullions and double transoms. There are fine chimneys, gables and a good example of a strapwork frieze.

The grounds are laid out in formal 17th-century style with boxed yew hedges and sandstone balustraded terraces decorated with Italianate terracotta vases. Near the Cound Brook is a flagstaff held by a sandstone gnome.

== Later years ==
Owned by the Owen family until 1863, the house then passed to the Cholmondeley family, and novelist Mary Cholmondeley (1859–1925) lived in the hall for a few months in 1896 before moving to London. Her uncle, Reginald Cholmondeley (1826–1896), owned the house when it was visited by the American writer Mark Twain (1835–1910) in 1873 and 1879. The house and estate was sold by the family in 1897 to Edward Brocklehurst Fielden, who sold it on in 1926.

According to a local legend – noted to be "utterly at variance with facts", not least in being unsupported by the history of ownership of the house, which indicates it was granted by King Henry VIII to a Sir Henry Knyvett who lived there only briefly before selling it on – no heir to Condover Hall will prosper since the hall was cursed from the gallows by a butler falsely accused of murder; he had been condemned by the lies of the son of Knyvett, lord of the manor, who stabbed his father to death. Knyvett's bloody handprint on a wall allegedly defied all attempts to wash it away.

In 1930 a Great Western Railway Hall Class 4900 steam locomotive, No. 4915 with a 4-6-0 configuration, was named Condover Hall, remaining in regular service until 1965. In the 1980s Hornby toys issued an electric toy replica of the engine. The train used in the Harry Potter films as the Hogwarts Express is an identical Hall class locomotive. On 21 August 1994, Rail Express Systems liveried Class 47/7, No. 47784 was named Condover Hall at the Crewe Basford Hall Yard open day.

== Second World War ==
Between August 1942 and June 1945 the hall was commandeered by the War Office and used as the officers' mess for nearby RAF Condover.

== Residential schools ==
In 1946 the hall was purchased from its then owner, William Abbey, by RNIB and operated as Condover Hall School for the Blind, a residential facility for children aged between 5 and 18. RNIB built a covered heated swimming pool for use by the pupils. The hall was sold in 2005 to the Priory Group, who opened a residential school for autistic children and a college for young people with Asperger syndrome. The facility opened in 2006, but in 2008 the closure of both sites was announced. Condover Horizon school closed in January 2009, and Farleigh College Condover closed on 23 July 2009. In 2011 JCA Adventure bought the house, and it now hosts children's residential adventure holidays.

== See also ==
- Grade I listed buildings in Shropshire
- Listed buildings in Condover
