= Condover railway station =

Former railway station in Shropshire, England

Condover
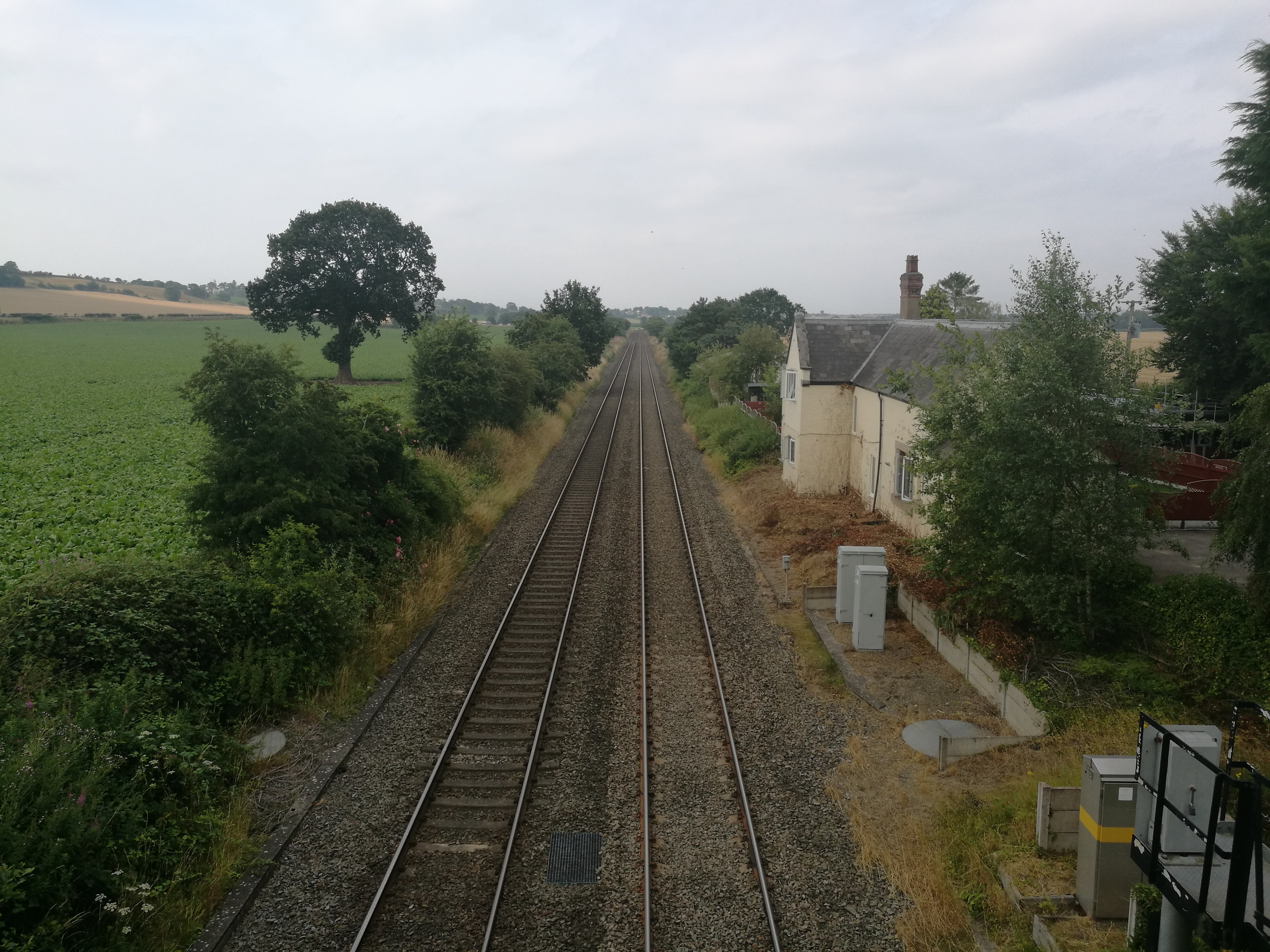
- Location of Condover railway station

General information
- Location: Condover, Shropshire; England
- Coordinates: 52.6536°N 2.7651°W
- Grid reference: SJ482065
- Platforms: 2

Other information
- Status: Disused

History
- Original company: Shrewsbury and Hereford Railway
- Pre-grouping: Shrewsbury and Hereford Railway
- Post-grouping: Shrewsbury and Hereford Railway

Key dates
- 20 April 1852: Opened
- 9 June 1958: Closed
Location

Condover railway station was located in the village of Condover, Shropshire.

Originally built by the Shrewsbury and Hereford Railway and opened in 1852, the station closed in 1958 but its line, the Welsh Marches Line, is still operational.

The station building is now a cattery and kennels.

Preceding station	Disused railways	Following station
Shrewsbury; Line and station open	LNWR and GWR joint Shrewsbury and Hereford Railway	Dorrington; Line open, station closed
