= Dorrington railway station =

Former railway station in Shropshire, England

Dorrington
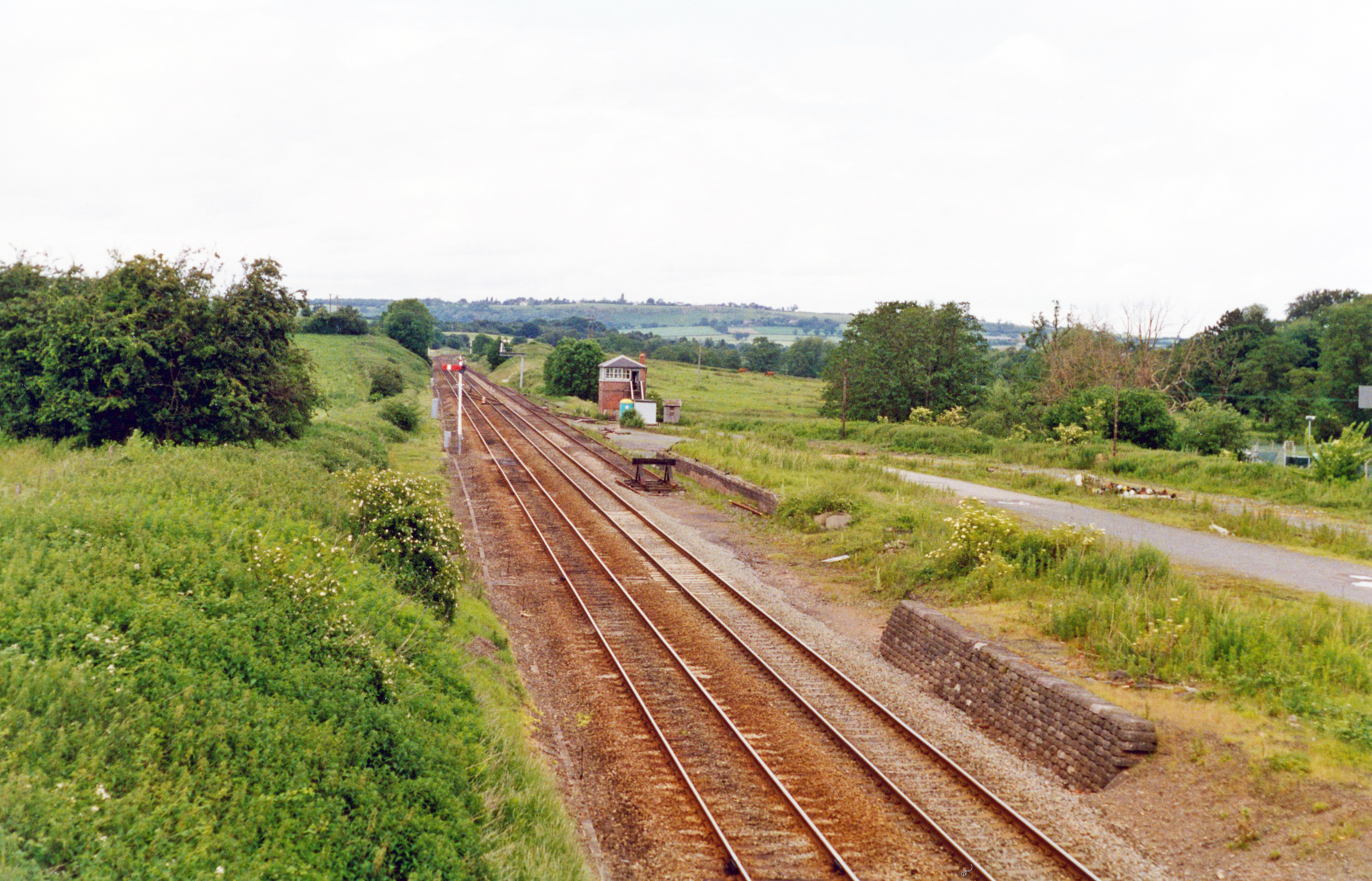
- Dorrington station site in 1993

General information
- Location: Dorrington, Shropshire; England
- Coordinates: 52.6249°N 2.7707°W
- Grid reference: SJ478033
- Platforms: 2

Other information
- Status: Disused

History
- Original company: Shrewsbury and Hereford Railway
- Pre-grouping: LNWR and GWR joint
- Post-grouping: LMS and GWR joint

Key dates
- 21 April 1852: Opened
- 9 June 1958: Closed
Location

Dorrington railway station was a station in Dorrington, Shropshire, England. The station was opened in 1852 and closed in 1958.

On the site of the station's goods yard, which is located just to the east of the village, is now an oil depot and a plant hire depot.

Preceding station	Disused railways	Following station
Condover; Line open, station closed	LNWR and GWR joint Shrewsbury and Hereford Railway	Leebotwood; Line open, station closed
