= Shrewsbury Motocross Club =

Shrewsbury Motocross Club is an amateur motocross club catering for competition motocross riders in the Shrewsbury area and surrounding districts. The club is affiliated to the AMCA.

The club has 60 rider members, and stages six race meetings per year at its circuit at Allfields, near Condover, Shrewsbury. Up to date information regarding fixtures and membership can be found by visiting the Shrewsbury Motocross Club's website.

The club was initially formed in 1976, by former members of the Telford Motor Club. Many Telford riders were in fact Shrewsbury residents and opted to form a club in the local area.

Two Shrewsbury riders have achieved national success, Paul Martin was 1994 AMCA 750cc Champion and Gary Davies, the most successful rider in AMCA history, won most of his 11 national titles as a Shrewsbury rider.
