= Bomere Pool =

Lake in Shropshire, England

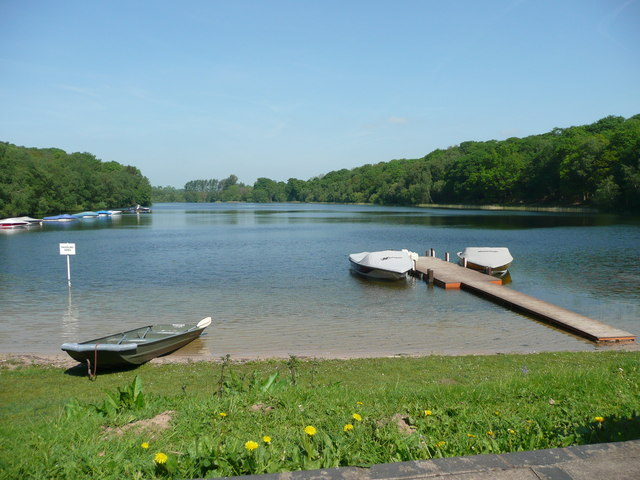

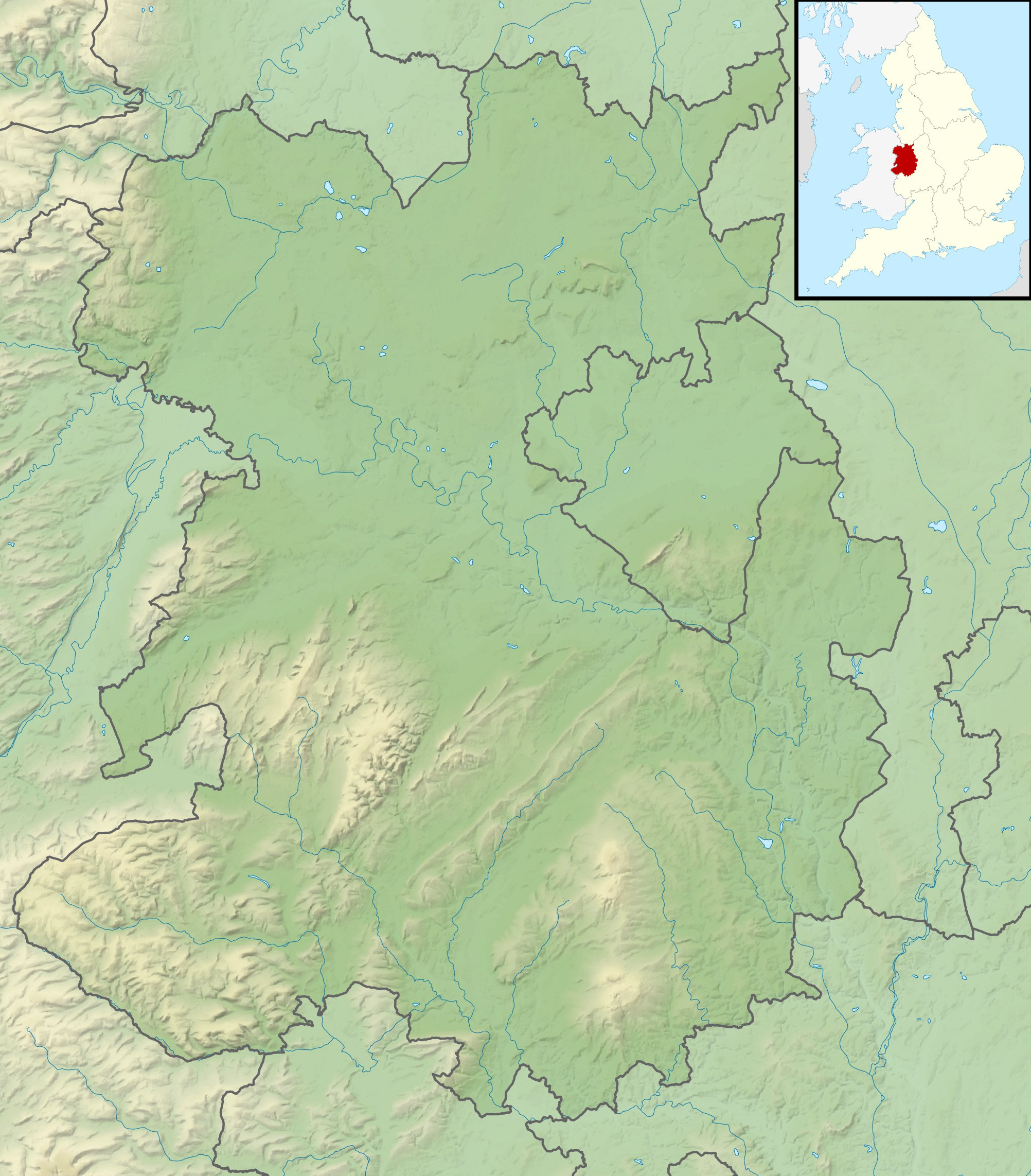
- Location within Shropshire
- Location: Shropshire, England
- Coordinates: 52°40′N 2°44′W
- Type: Mere, oligotrophic
- Basin countries: United Kingdom
- Surface area: 10.3 ha (25 acres)
- Average depth: 6.1 m (20 ft)
- Max. depth: 15.2 m (50 ft)
- Surface elevation: 80 m (260 ft)

Bomere Pool is a large mere lying between the villages of Bayston Hill and Condover in the county of Shropshire, England, 4.7 miles (7.6 kilometres) south of the county town of Shrewsbury. The pool is classified as a Site of Special Scientific Interest as the most oligotrophic (nutrient poor) body of water on the Shropshire - Cheshire plain.

Once open to the public, Bomere Pool and the surrounding woodlands are now privately owned and operate a centre of towed water sports throughout the year. A public right of way runs close to the Northern Shore for much of its length. There is a small resident population housed in a number of flats.

== History ==
=== Geology ===
Vast tracts of Shropshire were covered with ice sheets during the last ice age about 18,000 years ago. When the ice sheets retreated large ice blocks were left isolated, often surrounded and covered by the moraine, gravels and clays left behind by the glaciers. When this glacial ice eventually melted sediments collapsed into holes or depressions referred to as 'kettle holes'. These holes had no means of drainage and would either turn into steep sided lakes, usually referred to as meres in Shropshire or, if the lake completely filled with clay and peat, became a moss bog. Bomere Pool is a particularly fine example of a kettle hole mere.

=== Use by humans ===
Bomere Pool has been utilised by humans for thousands of years. There is the archaeological mounded remains of a suspected Iron Age settlement at the south east corner of the mere. Two thousand years ago there was a substantial Roman army camp and an associated civilian settlement on the pool side. Shropshire's oldest ghost of a Roman soldier seeking his lover who was lost in a sudden flood has been sighted on Easter Day, in the years when Easter falls on the same day as it did the year he died.

=== Literary connections ===
The 1920s romantic novelist Mary Webb located the action of her most famous novel Precious Bane around Bomere Pool, which she called Sarn Mere in the book. Webb wrote the book while living in Spring Cottage on Lyth Hill near Bayston Hill and at her London home. The travel writer S.P.B. Mais wrote of being taken to Bomere Pool to see Webb's setting for Sarn in the 1930s.

Bomere Pool also featured in several of the medieval detective novels about Brother Cadfael by novelist Ellis Peters.

=== Recent history ===
Between the 1960s and 1980s the pool was a popular destination for local residents, particularly on warmer days when families with children enjoyed splashing about in the water, with a cafe and ice-cream stall providing refreshments. There was also a free squash court, built by a local farmer, and a public house open to all.

In 1986 a woman out for a walk discovered the bones of a woolly mammoth and three juvenile mammoths in an associated nearby moss and gravel bog sink hole.

== Bomere Pool today ==
In 1989 the property changed hands; the lake, beach and facilities were closed to the general public and made available exclusively only for residents, members and guests of the private Wakeboard & Water Skiing Club that use the pool for regular water sports. Public access is now restricted to the right of way close to the Northern shore. There are 25 acres (100,000 m^{2}) of pool nestled in a secluded traditional forest of a further 125 acres (0.51 km^{2}), woodland that once formed part of Bayston Hill and Condover Royal hunting forest. The closed public house has now been converted into multiple occupancy, individual private flats.

== See also ==
- Condover
