= Reginald Cholmondeley =

English artist (1826–1896)

Reginald Cholmondeley JP DL
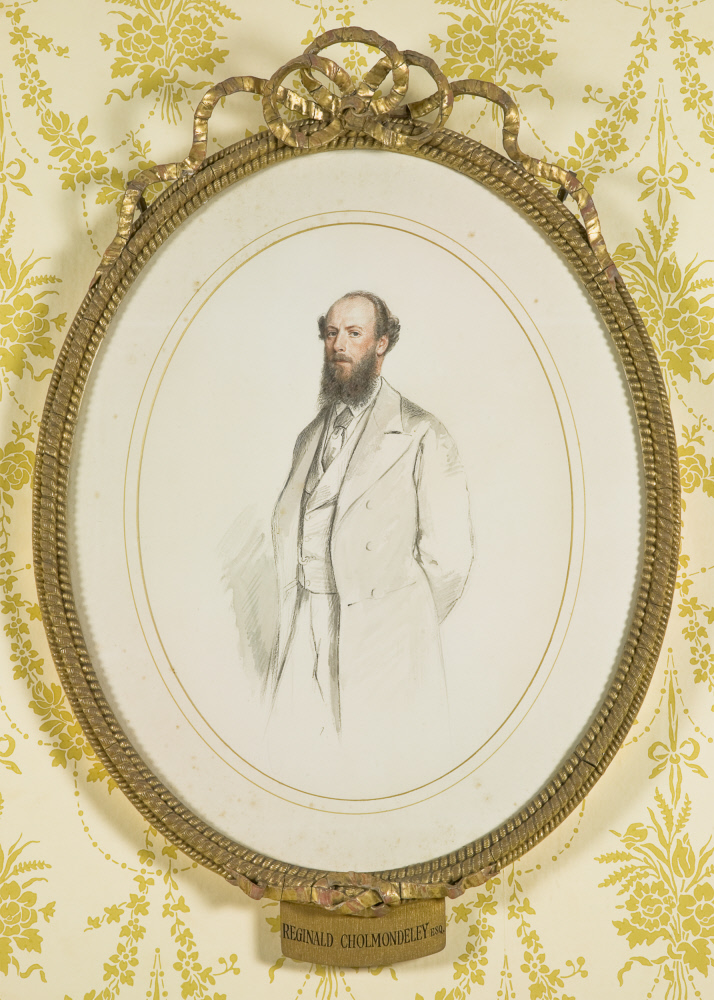
- Reginald Cholmondeley (1826–1896) by George Richmond
- Born: 20 April 1826; Hodnet, Shropshire
- Died: 10 February 1896 (aged 69); Hodnet, Shropshire
- Resting place: Church of St Mary and St Andrew, Condover
- Education: Trinity College, Cambridge
- Occupation: Artist
- Spouse: Alice Mary Egerton (m. 1867; died 1868)
- Children: Alice Cholmondeley (died 1868)
- Parents: Charles Cowper Cholmondeley; Mary Heber
- Relatives: Mary Cholmondeley (niece)
- Family: Cholmondeley

Reginald Cholmondeley JP DL (20 April 1826 – 10 February 1896) of Condover Hall, Shropshire, was an English landowner, artist and collector. He was a Justice of the Peace and Deputy Lieutenant of Shropshire and held the rank of Major, 1st battalion 28th Shropshire Rifle Volunteers. The Condover estate passed to him on the death of his brother, Thomas, in 1864.

== Early life and education ==
Cholmondeley was born on 20 April 1826 at Hodnet, the third son of Charles Cowper Cholmondeley (1795–1831) of Chester, rector of Hodnet, Shropshire and Mary Heber (d. 1846). His eldest brother, Thomas, was a Major of the first Administrative Battalion of the Shropshire Rifle Volunteers; another brother, Charles, was a Catholic priest; his youngest brother was the Reverend Richard Hugh, the rector at Hodnet, whose daughter was the novelist Mary Cholmondeley.

He attended Trinity College, Cambridge where he matriculated in 1845, obtaining a B.A. in 1849, M.A. in 1856 and was admitted at the Inner Temple on 18 January 1850, but not called. He trained as a painter and sculptor in the 1850s.

== Condover ==
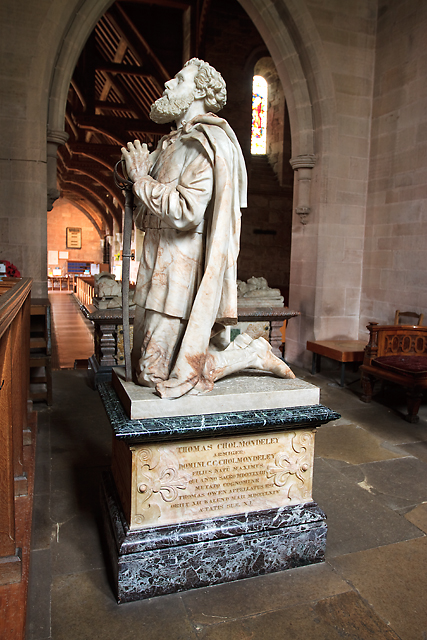
Monument to Thomas Cholmondeley by George Frederic Watts

In March 1863, following the death of his cousin, Edward William Smythe Owen (1793–1863), Thomas Cholmondeley (1823–1864) inherited Condover Hall and the large estate adjacent, and took the name of Owen as a condition of the inheritance. A year later he married Victoria Alexandrina Cotes, daughter of John Cotes and Lady Louisa Jenkinson, daughter of Charles Jenkinson, later 3rd Earl of Liverpool and a godchild of Queen Victoria. He travelled to Italy for his wedding tour and in Florence he was "seized with a malignant fever" on 10 April and died there on 20 April 1864. His brother, Reginald, who had met him in Florence, carried back his remains to England, and he is buried in Condover churchyard.

In the parish church at Condover there is a marble monument to Thomas Cholmondeley by George Frederic Watts (1817–1904), featuring a kneeling bearded figure of the deceased, wearing boots, a cloak and a soldier's tunic, with his hands clasping a sword, looking out across the choir stalls in front of him, into the chancel.

The Condover estate devised to Reginald on the death of his brother, Thomas, in March 1864. His country seat, Condover Hall, is generally regarded as "the finest stone manor-house in Shropshire." As well as being a considerable landowner, Cholmondeley was an enthusiastic amateur sculptor of some accomplishment. Many of the elaborate sculptural decorations at Condover Hall are his work. He also owned a house in London. Originally in single occupation as No. 37 Palace Gate, this large red-brick house at the corner with Canning Place was built in about 1869–70 for Reginald Cholmondeley, to whom Cubitts granted a ninety-nine-year lease from September 1870, at £100 per annum. The architect was Frederick Pepys Cockerell, who also worked for Cholmondeley on the restoration of his country seat, Condover Hall.

Other building projects he was responsible for as squire of Condover included, at the parish church the rebuilding of the chancel and mortuary chapel in which his family monuments are contained, and the internal restoration of the nave in 1878 at a cost to himself of around £5,000. He also built the Church of England village school.

=== Marriage ===
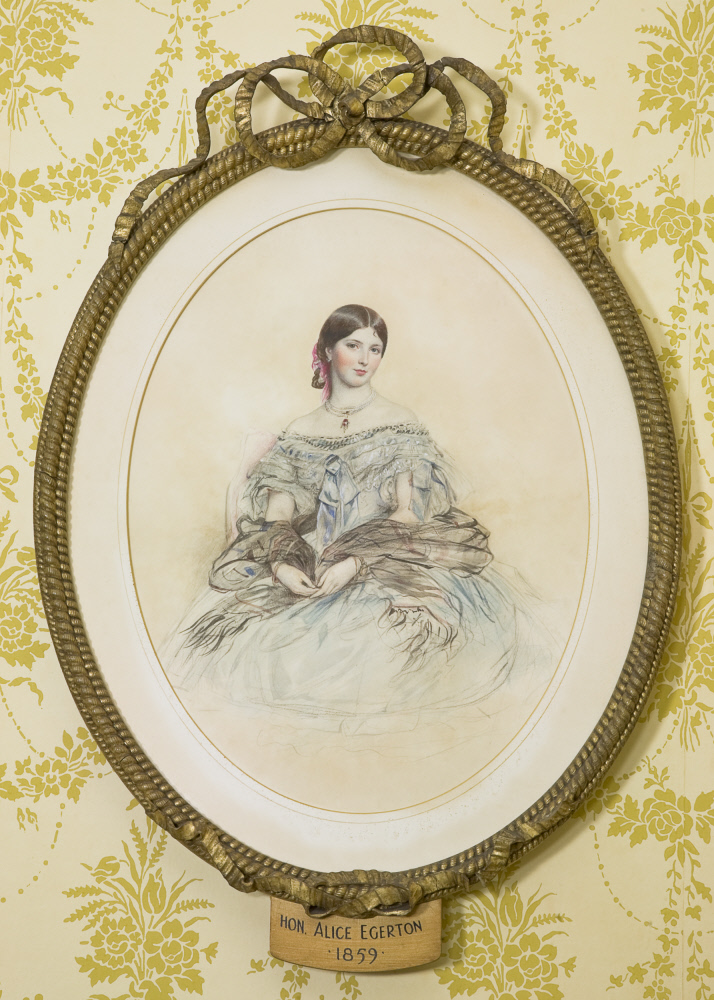
The Hon. Alice Mary Egerton, The Hon. Mrs Reginald Cholmondeley (d.1868) George Richmond

On 17 October 1867 at Rostherne, Cholmondeley married Alice Mary Egerton (1836–27 November 1868), daughter of William Egerton, 1st Baron Egerton of Tatton and Charlotte Elizabeth Loftus, daughter of John Loftus, 2nd Marquess of Ely. His younger brother, the Reverend Richard Hugh Cholmondeley, officiated at the ceremony.

His new wife was an artist and a poet and the couple were well-suited but the marriage would be short-lived. Alice died in childbirth on 27 November and was buried on 3 December 1868; her infant daughter, Alice, died three weeks after her mother, on 11 December and was buried on 19 December at the parish church at Condover.

In the Church of St Mary and St Andrew, Condover, there is a monument to Alice Cholmondeley that was sculpted by her husband of one year. It features a recumbent effigy of Alice, with her infant daughter by her side and an empty cradle at her feet. Cholmondeley also sculpted the recumbent effigy of his cousin, Blanche Heber (d. 1870), at St Luke's Church, Hodnet.

In 1871 he published Poems by A.C., a volume of poems by his late wife and dedicated to Robert Browning, and in 1875, Emblems, a volume of her drawings. A presentation copy of the latter was given to the banker, George Rae.

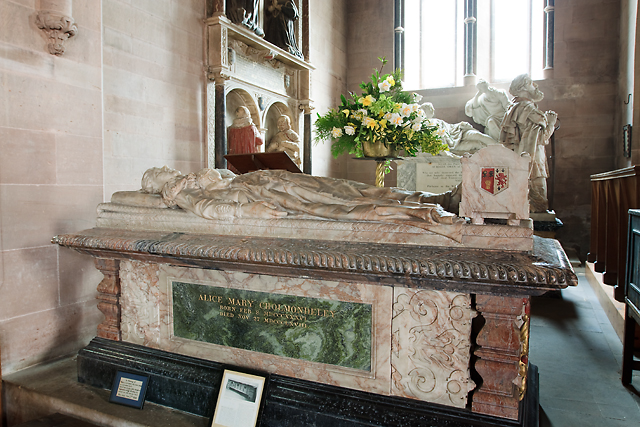
Monument to Alice Cholmondeley by Reginald Cholmondeley, Church of St Mary and St Andrew, Condover

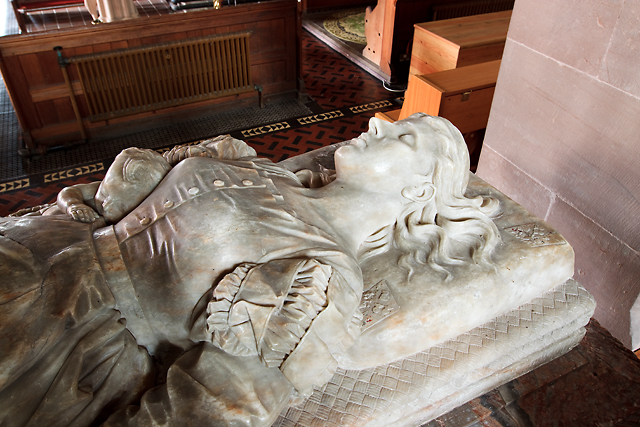
Monument to Alice Cholmondeley (detail)

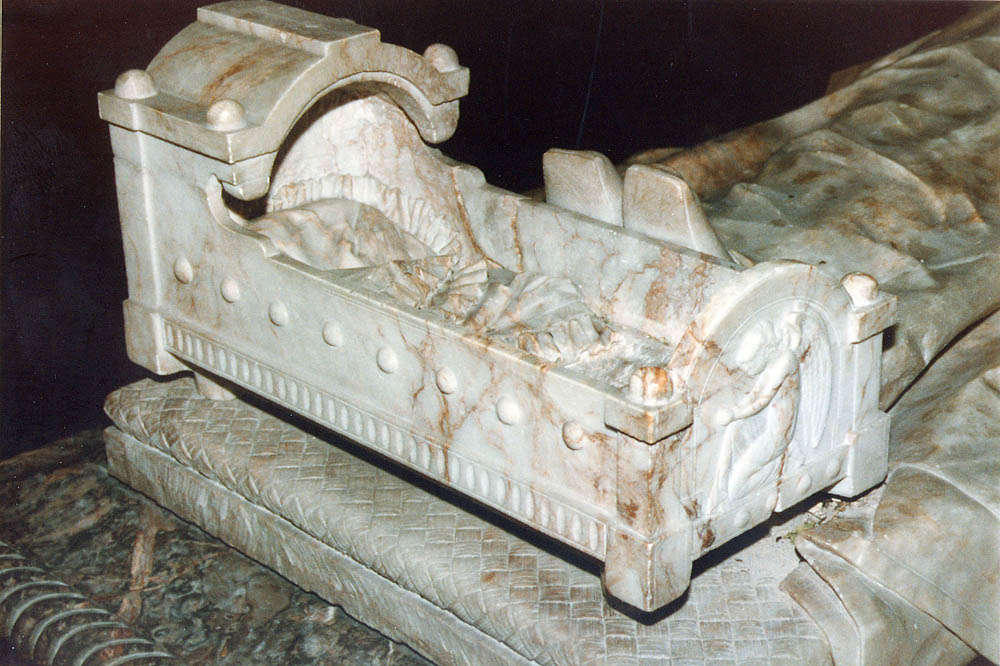
Monument to Alice Cholmondeley (detail)

=== Landowner and collector ===
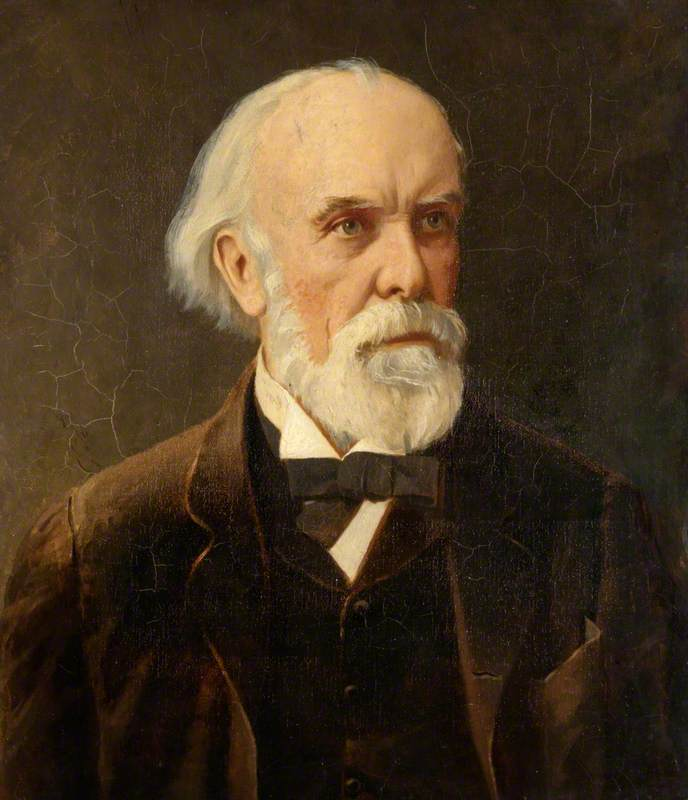
Sir Theodore Martin (1816–1909), Lawyer and writer, by Reginald Cholmondeley

Cholmondeley was "a man of powerful personality and fine taste", an accomplished artist and talented amateur sculptor as well as an enthusiastic collector of books, manuscripts, paintings and curiosities. He had exhibited at the Royal Academy and counted many of London's artists such as G. F. Watts and John Everett Millais (1829–1896) as personal friends.

His circle of friends also included the poet and playwright, Robert Browning (1812–1889), poet, biographer and translator, Sir Theodore Martin (1816–1909), whose portrait he painted, and Lady Martin as well as the American writer, Mark Twain (1835–1910) and his wife, who visited Condover in 1873 and 1879.

On 2 July 1881 (the day that President Garfield was shot) Olivia Clemens received from their friend Reginald Cholmondeley a letter of condolence on the death of her husband in Australia; startling enough, though in reality rather comforting than otherwise, for the reason that the "Mark Twain" who had died in Australia was a very persistent impostor.

When he wrote to Twain to apologise for the mistake the humourist graciously replied:

"Being dead I might be excused from writing letters, but I am not that kind of a corpse. May I never be so dead as to neglect the hail of a friend from a far land."

Cholmondeley took part in a natural history expedition to the West Indies in 1876 with botanist Henry Higgins to collect specimens for the Liverpool Museum, sailing in a yacht, The Argo, which he had fitted out. A mollusc discovered on the expedition was named conus cholmondeleyi after him. On return he compiled a manuscript (unpublished) book of the expedition.

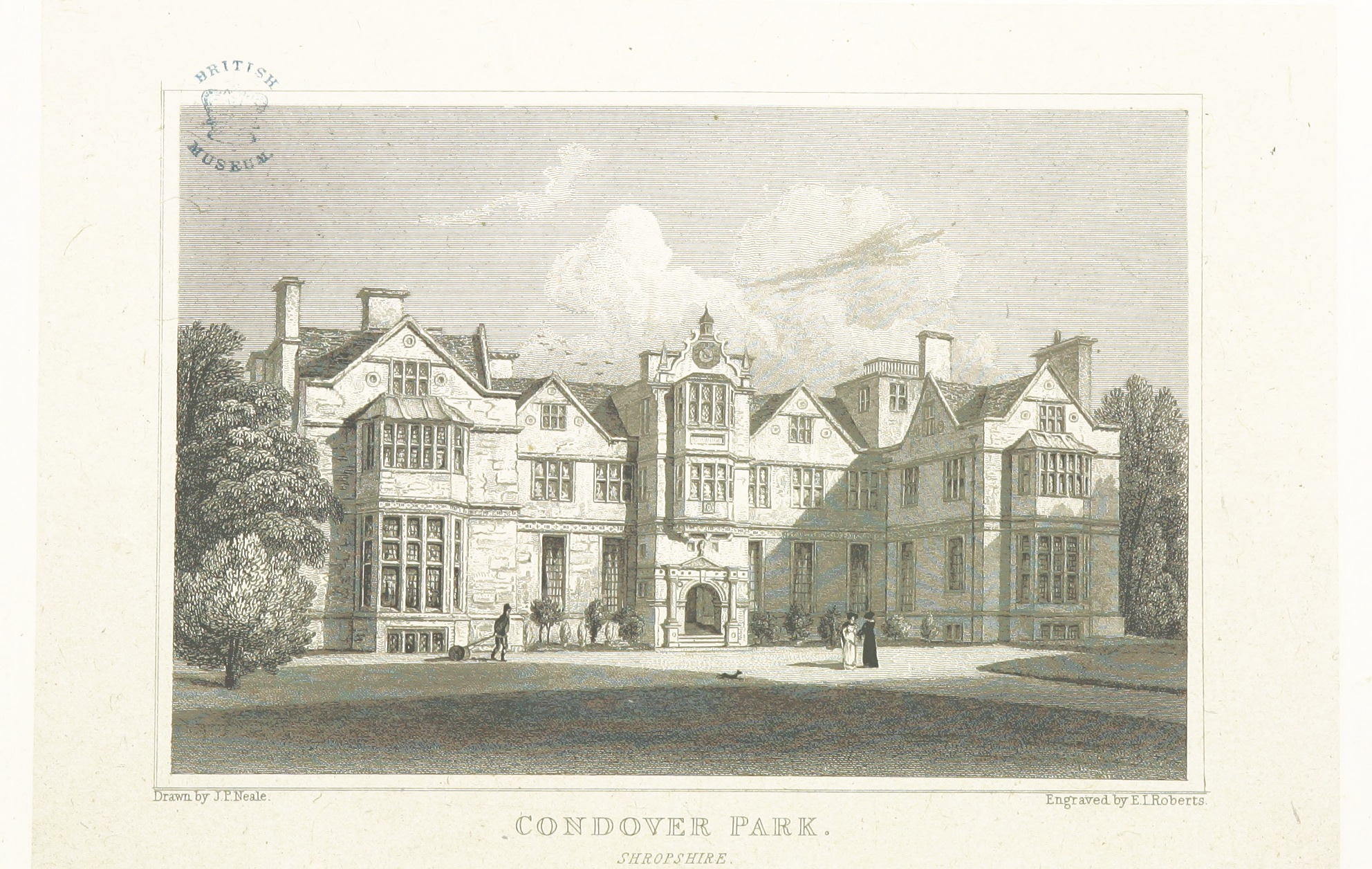
Condover Hall, engraving by E. I. Roberts after J. P. Neale

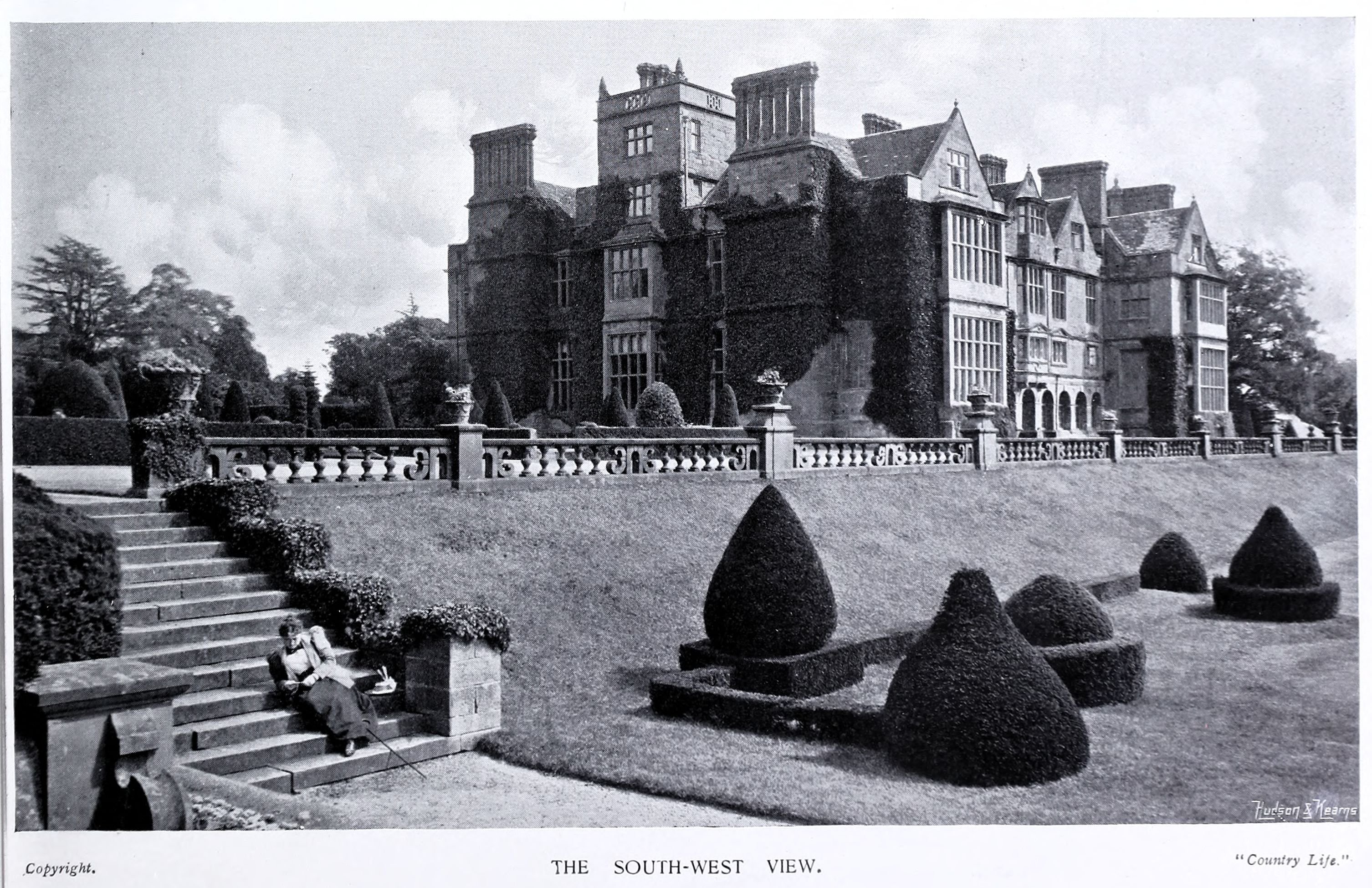
Condover Hall, south-west view

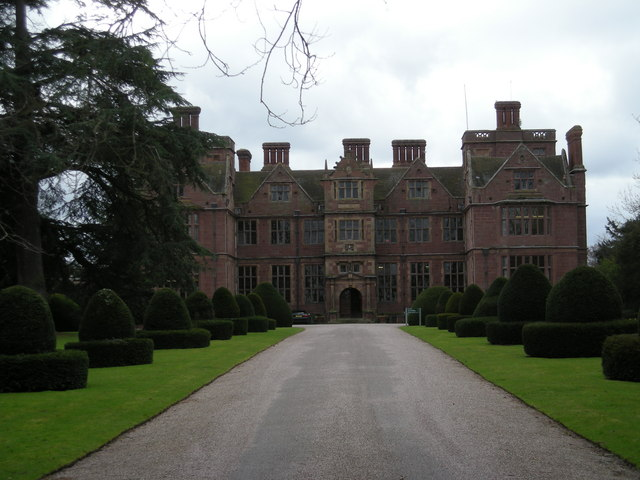
Condover Hall, front view

Cholmondeley owned a number of rare books as well as valuable paintings, among them Elizabethan, Old Masters and many more; armour and Birds of Paradise that he purchased from the ornithologist, John Gould.

==== Books ====
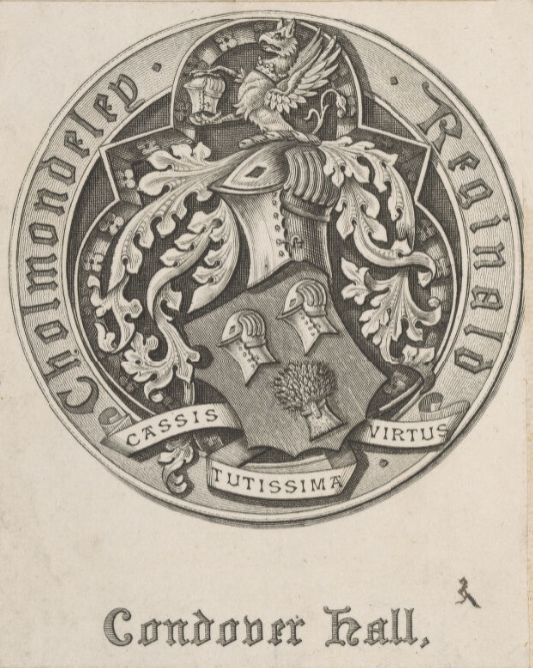
Armorial Bookplate of Reginald Cholmondeley of Condover Hall (1826–1896)

Arms of Cholmondeley of Vale Royal: Gules, 2 esquires' helmets proper in chief, garnished Or, in base a garb, Or

The most important books in his library were:

- Nicholas Cox, The Gentleman's Recreation, 1674
- Robert William Eyton, The Antiquities of Shropshire, 1854–1860
- Oliver Goldsmith, The Vicar of Wakefield, 1766
- Jean de La Fontaine, Contes et Nouvelles, 1762
- Longus, Les Amours Pastorales de Daphnis et Chloe, 1745
- George Stanhope, Parson's Christian Directory, 1716
- Dean Swift, Gulliver's Travels, 1726
- Voltaire, Œvres, 1735
- Horace Walpole, The Castle of Otranto, 1791
- Las Quarto Libros de Amadis de Gaula, 1533
- Richard Hakluyt, Principal Navigations, Voyages, and Discoveries of the English Nation, 1589
- Carl Schütz; Johann Ziegler, Vues de la Ville de Vienne et de Vues en Tyrol, Styrie, 1785
- An imperfect copy of the first folio Shakespeare, 1623
- David Wilkins, Concilia Magnæ Britanniæ et Hiberniæ, 1737

==== Manuscripts ====
- Documents letters and papers written by the lawyer and antiquary, John Smith of North Nibley, Gloucestershire, steward of Henry Berkeley, 7th Baron Berkeley (1534–1613) and MP for Midhurst, Sussex in 1621. There is a well-filled volume of notes made by Smith when he sat in Parliament but they do no contribute anything beyond what is already known.
  - A fine early copy (on a roll of parchment) of the poem called The Stacions of Rome, giving an account of the various churches and shrines at Rome, of the relics there, and the indulgences consequent on visits to them.
- Collections of the 18th century, by the physician and antiquary, William Cowper (1701–1767), of Overleigh Hall, Chester, for the history and antiquities of Chester and the Isle of Man. Cowper's niece, Dorothy Cowper, married Thomas Cholmondeley (1726–1779) of Vale Royal, bringing with her the Overleigh estate. She was Reginald Cholmondeley's great-grandmother.
  - Sanctus Tewdricus sive Pastor Bonus. A Latin drama, with illuminated title page by Henry Matthew Chamberling

==== Paintings ====
16th-century and 17th-century portraits of English kings, queens and courtiers, including:

- Henry VIII
- Mary I
- Elizabeth I
- Charles I
- Henrietta Maria
- Jane Seymour
- Thomas Seymour, 1st Baron Seymour of Sudeley: Thomas Seymour, Baron Seymour, 16th century, by unknown artist
- ?Elizabeth Seymour: Unknown woman, formerly known as Catherine Howard, late 17th-century, after Hans Holbein the Younger
- William Cecil, 1st Baron Burghley
- Richard Foxe, Bishop of Winchester
- Henry Fitzalan, 12th Earl of Arundel
- Henry Pole, 1st Baron Montagu
- Henry Sidney: Sir Henry Sidney, 1573, by unknown artist
- Francis Walsingham
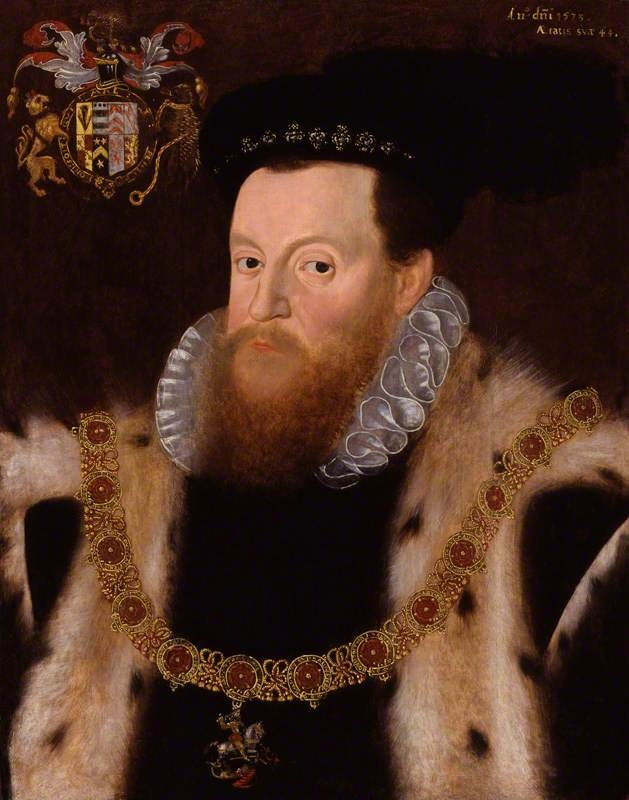
Sir Henry Sidney, 1573, by unknown artist

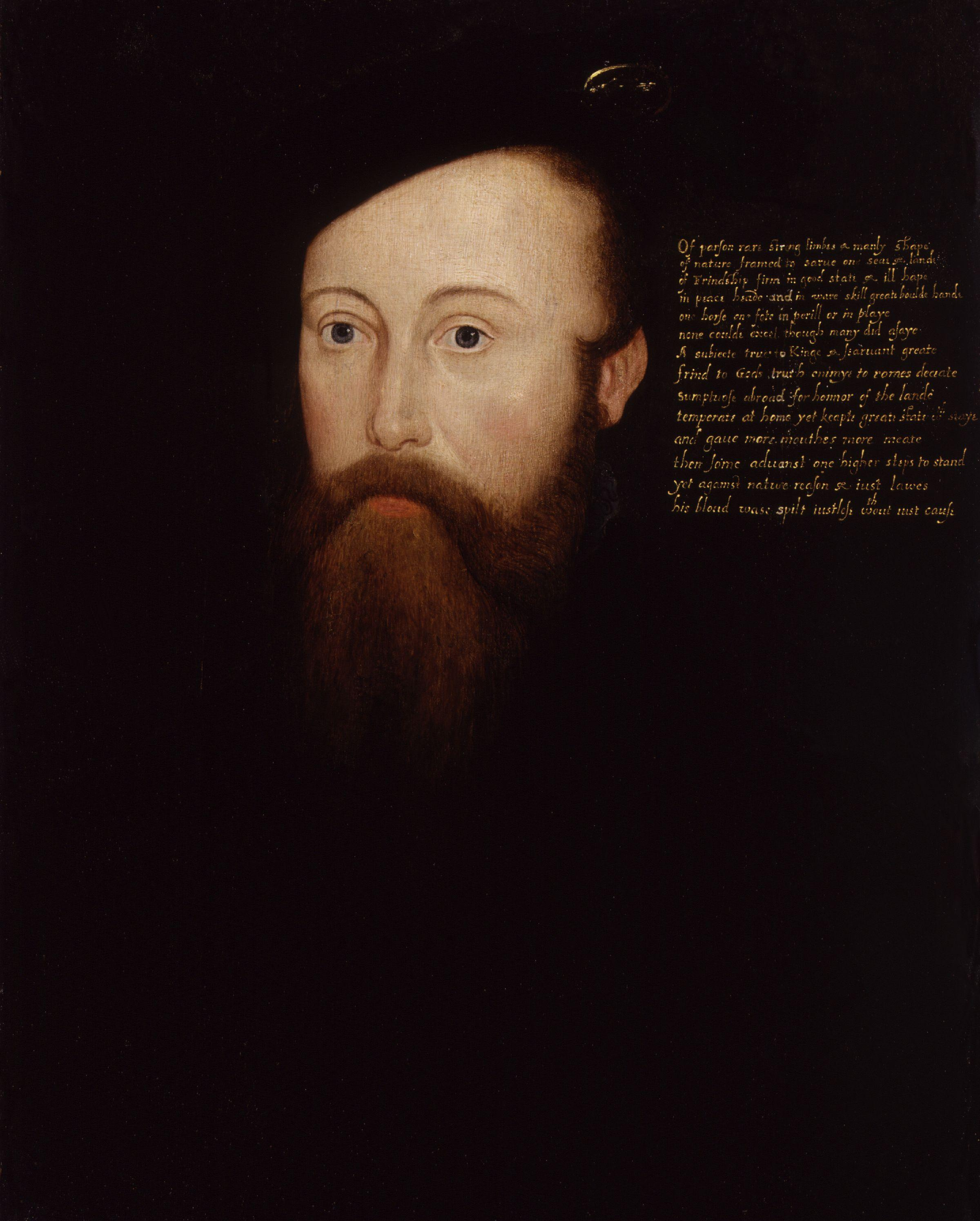
Thomas Seymour, Baron Seymour, 16th century, by unknown artist

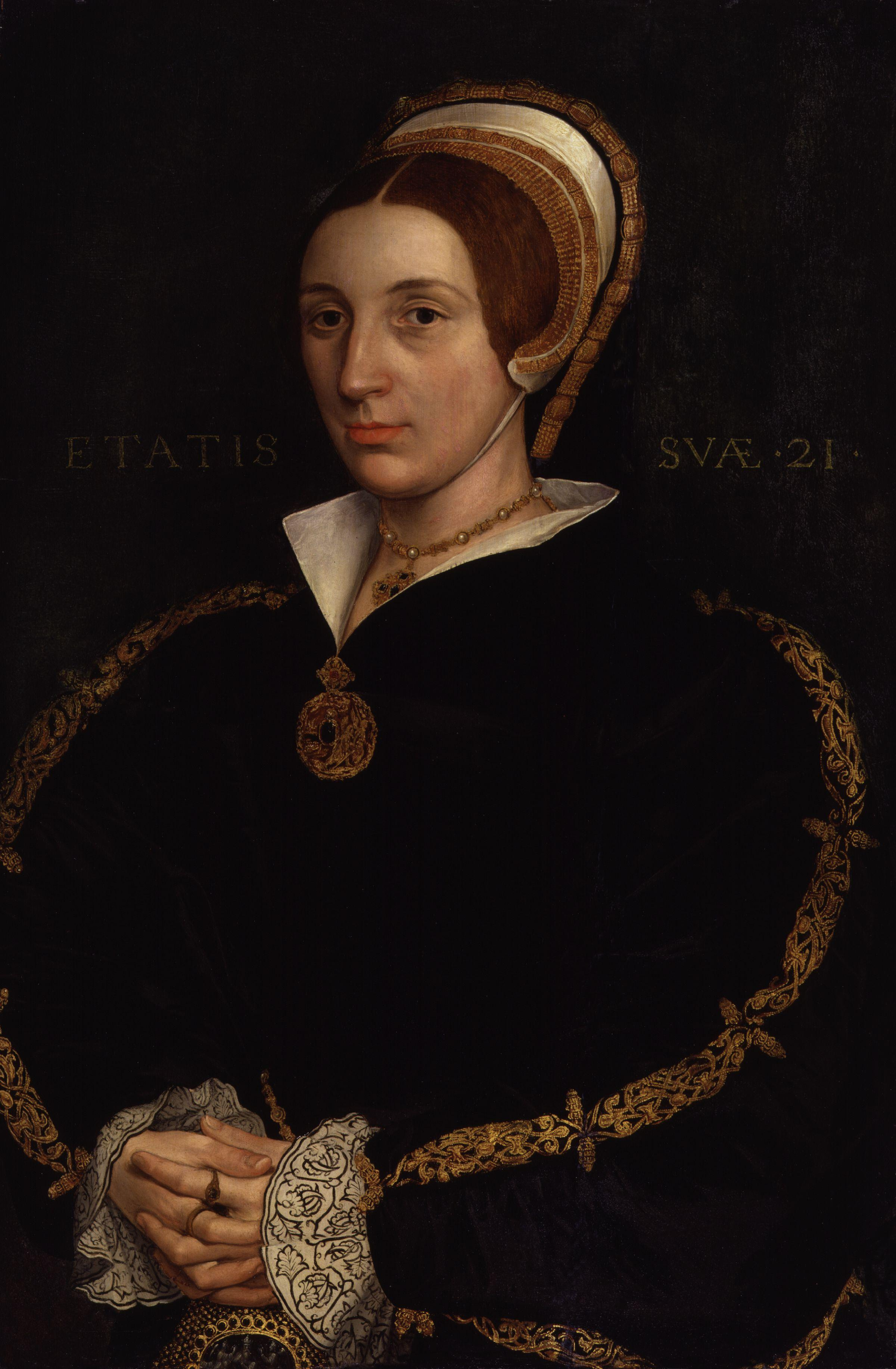
Unknown woman, formerly known as Catherine Howard, late 17th-century, after Hans Holbein the Younger

English School:

- Paintings by William Dobson, Thomas Lawrence, Godfrey Kneller, Philip James de Loutherbourg, George Stubbs, Anthony van Dyck,
- George Frederic Watts:
  - ?A Study with the Peacock's Feathers, c. 1862–1865
  - Paolo and Francesca, 1872 and
- Francesco Zuccarelli.

French School:

- Paintings by Juliette Peyrol Bonheur and Antoine Watteau.

Dutch School:

- Paintings by Paul Bril, Pieter Casteels, Lucas Cranach the Elder, Lucas de Heere, Jan Gossaert, Daniël Mijtens and others.

Spanish School:

- Paintings by Claudio Coello, Bartolomé Esteban Murillo, Juan Pantoja de la Cruz,
- Antonis Mor: Elisabeth de Valois, 1560,
- Jusepe de Ribera, Diego Velázquez, Federico Zuccaro and Francisco de Zurbarán.

Italian School:

- Paintings by Leandro Bassano, Jacopo Bellini, Boccaccio Boccaccino, Agnolo Bronzino, Canaletto,
- Antonio Maria Vassallo: The Larder, probably c. 1650–1660,

and others.

Venetian School:

- A painting by Paolo Veronese
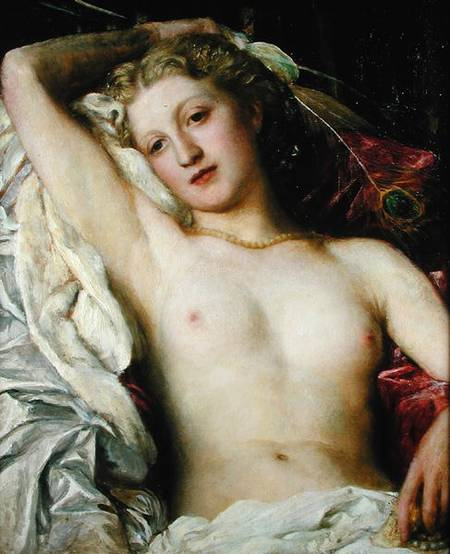
?A Study with the Peacock's Feathers, c. 1862–1865, George Frederic Watts.

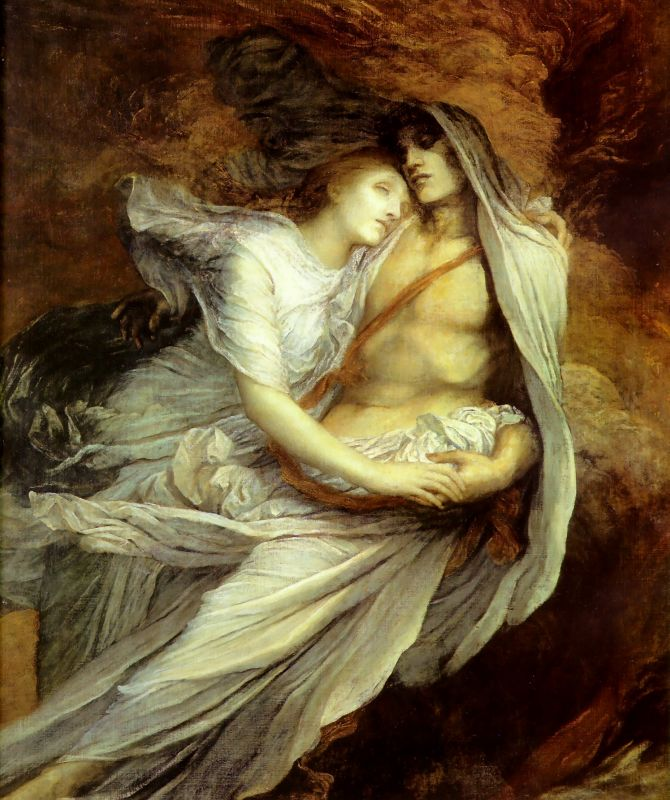
Paolo and Francesca, 1872, George Frederic Watts.

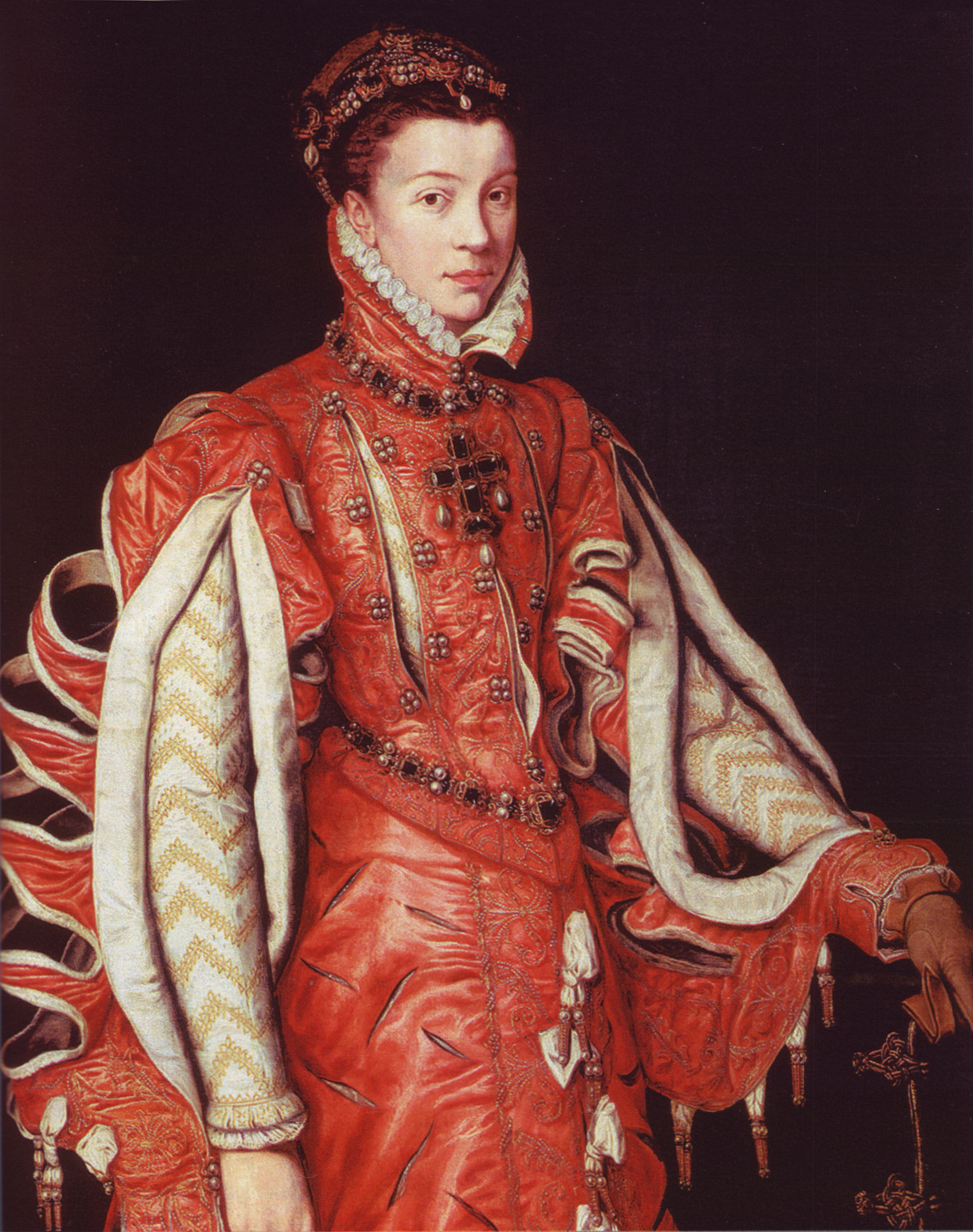
Elisabeth de Valois, 1560, by Antonis Mor

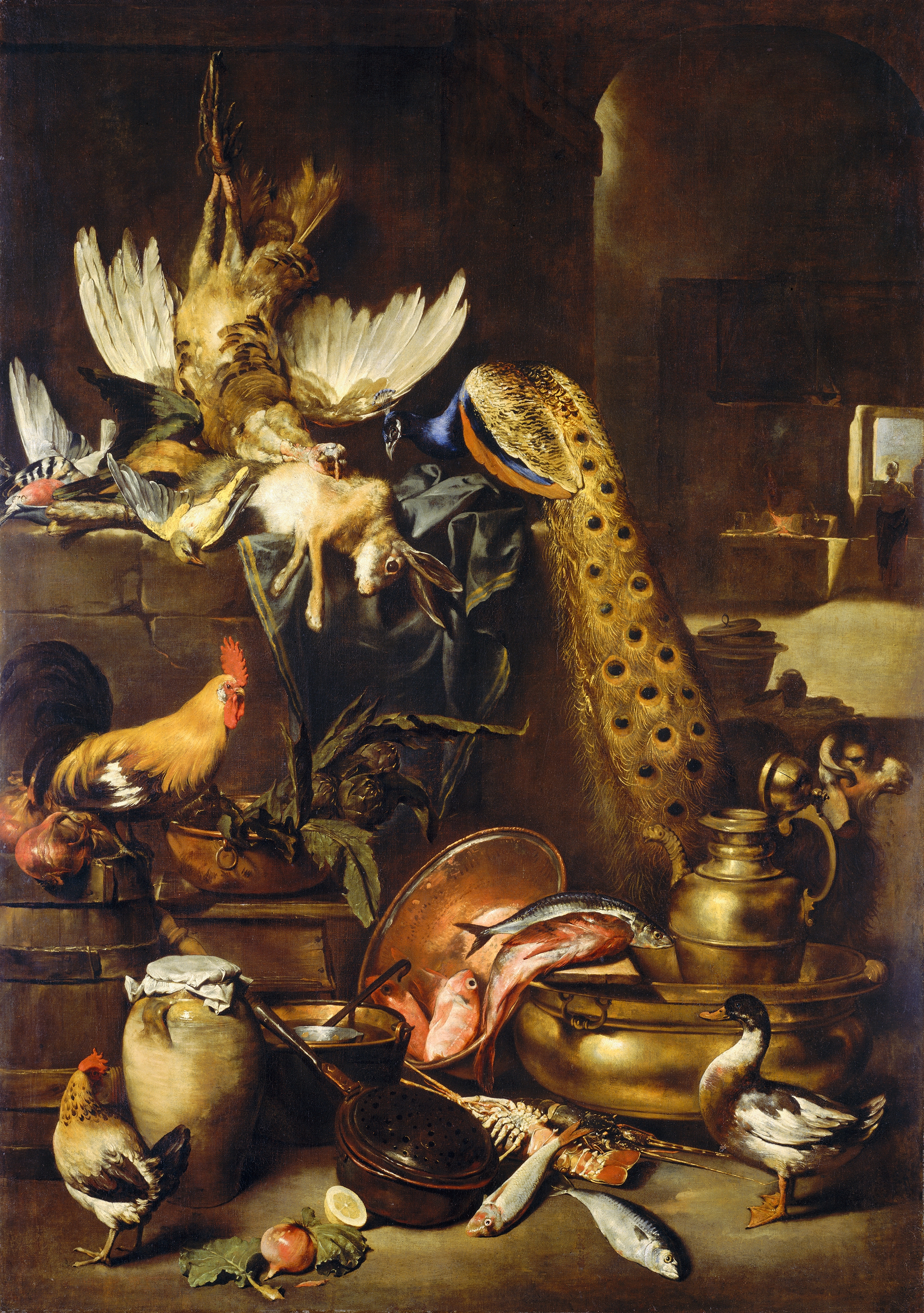
The Larder, probably c. 1650–1660, by Antonio Maria Vassallo

By the 1890s Cholmondeley found himself in debt as a result of his extravagance. Over the years he had spent on Condover Hall, its contents and gardens, what was needed for the estate, which became "so neglected and encumbered" that he was planning to sell it when he died in 1896, having for some time rented it to a nephew.

== Death ==
He died on 10 February 1896 at Hodnet and was buried on 13 February at the parish church at Condover. The Condover estate passed to his younger brother, the Reverend Richard Hugh Cholmondeley (1828–1910). The Condover estate and the collections of books, paintings, furniture and armour were sold in 1897. The Condover estate was purchased in 1897 by Edward Fielden, who later sold it in 1926.

== Sources ==
- Barrow, J. S.; Herson, J. D.; Lawes, A. H.; Riden, P. J.; Seaborne, M. V. J. (2005). "Manors and Estates in and Near the City". In Thacker, A. T.; Lewis, C. P. (eds.). A History of the County of Chester. Vol. 5. Pt. 2. pp. 322–330 – via British History Online.
- Blakeway, John Brickdale; Fletcher, W. G. D. (1893). "History of Pontesbury". Transactions of the Shropshire Archaeological and Natural History Society. Series 2. Vol. 5. Shrewsbury: Shropshire Archaeological and Natural History Society. pp. 229–252. OCLC 5155820.
- Browning, Robert (1974). McAleer, Edward C. (ed.). Learned Lady: Letters from Robert Browning to Mrs. Thomas Fitzgerald, 1876-1889. Cambridge, MA: Harvard University Press. ISBN 978-0-674-51900-8.
- Bryant, Barbara (12 March 2023). "Stephen T. Gooden at 57 Pall Mall: "An ambitious dealer" in the 1890s" (PDF). Colnaghi Studies Journal. 12: 11–25.
- Burke, Bernard (1898). Burke, Ashworth Peter (ed.). A Genealogical and Heraldic History of the Landed Gentry of Great Britain and Ireland. Vol. 1 (9th ed.). London: Harrison and Sons. p. 294. OCLC 1820800.
- Cholmondeley, Alice; Nettleship, J. J. (1875). Cholmondeley, Reginald (ed.). Emblems. Revised by J. J. Nettleship. London: Smith, Elder & Co. OCLC 29057827.
- Cholmondeley, Alice (1871). Poems, by A.C. (PDF). London: Smith, Elder & Co. OCLC 24730757 – via Bodleian Libraries.
- "The Cholmondeley Library". The Times. London. 2 April 1897. (subscription required)
- Christie, Manson & Woods (1897). Catalogue of the Collection of Pictures by Old Masters of the Late Reginald Cholmondeley, Esq. Removed from Condover Hall. London: Christie, Manson & Woods. OCLC 1041645135.
- "Country Homes – Gardens Old and New: Condover, Shropshire. The Seat of Mr. R. H. Cholmondeley". Country Life. Vol. 3, no. 64. London. 26 March 1898. pp. 368–370.
- "Country Homes – Gardens Old and New: Condover, Shropshire. The Seat of Mr. Edward B. Fielden". Country Life. Vol. 3, no. 65. London. 2 April 1898. pp. 400–402.
- Dickins, Gordon (1987). An Illustrated Literary Guide to Shropshire (2nd ed.). Shrewsbury: Shropshire Libraries. ISBN 978-0-903802-37-6.
- Gaydon, A. T., ed. (1968). The Victoria History of the Counties of England. Vol. 8: A History of Shropshire. London: Oxford University Press for the Institute of Historical Research. pp. 38–39. OCLC 504236613.
- Hodges, John Richard (2011). Condover Hall, Shropshire: The Story of an Elizabethan Country House. ISBN 9780955405761.
- Horwood, Alfred J.; Royal Commission on Historical Manuscripts (1876). "The Manuscripts of Reginald Cholmondeley, Esq., of Condover Hall, Shropshire". Fifth Report of the Royal Commission on Historical Manuscripts. London: H.M.S.O. pp. 333-360.
- Jeckyll, Gertrude; Elgood, George S. (1935). Some English Gardens. London: Longmans, Green & Co. pp. 74–75.
- Leach, Francis, ed. (1891). The County Seats of Shropshire. Shrewbury: Eddowes's Shrewsbury Journal Office. pp. 49–53. OCLC 889852554.
- Millais, John Guille (1899). The Life and Letters of Sir John Everett Millais, President of the Royal Academy. Vol. 2. New York: Frederick A. Stokes. pp. 169–170. OCLC 607759307.
- Neale, John Preston (1825). Views of the Seats of Noblemen and Gentlemen, in England, Wales, Scotland, and Ireland. Series 2. Vol. 2. London: Sherwood, Jones and co. OCLC 1952681.
- Newman, John; Pevsner, Nikolaus (2006). Shropshire. Buildings of England (New ed.). New Haven: Yale University Press. ISBN 978-0-300-12083-7.
- Ormerod, George; Helsby, Thomas (1882). The History of the County Palatine and City of Chester: Compiled from Original Evidences in Public Offices the Harleian and Cottonian Mss. Parochial Registers Private Muniments Unpublished Ms. Collections of Successive Cheshire Antiquaries and a Personal Survey of Every Township in the County; Incorporated with a Republication of King's Hale Royal and Leycester's Cheshire Antiquities. Vol. 2 (2nd ed.). George Routledge and Sons. OCLC 223243317.
- Orr, Alexandra Sutherland (1891). Life and Letters of Robert Browning. London: Smith, Elder & Co. OCLC 424457.
- Oulton, Carolyn W. de la L. (2009). Let the Flowers Go: A Life of Mary Cholmondeley. London: Pickering & Chatto. OCLC 1250004103.
- Paine, Albert Bigelow (1935). Mark Twain, a Biography; The Personal and Literary Life of Samuel Langhorne Clemens; With Letters Comments and Incidental Writings Hitherto Unpublished (Centenary ed.). New York: Harper & Brothers. OCLC 2109370.
- Sheppard, F. H. W., ed. (1975). "Palace Gate". Survey of London. Vol. 38: South Kensington Museums Area. pp. 38–48 – via British History Online.
- Strong, Roy (1969). Tudor and Jacobean Portraits. Vol. 1. London: H.M.S.O. pp. 288–289. ISBN 978-0-11-290056-6. OCLC 313527733.
- Thoreau, Henry David (2013). Sanborn, F. B. (ed.). The Writings of Henry David Thoreau. Vol. 6: Familiar Letters. p. 383, n. 102.
- Tipping, H. Avray (1 June 1918). "Country Homes – Gardens Old and New: Condover Hall, Shropshire – 1. The Seat of Mr. Edward Brocklehurst Fielden". Country Life. Vol. 43, no. 1117. London. pp. 508–513.
- Tipping, H. Avray (8 June 1918). "Country Homes – Gardens Old and New: Condover Hall, Shropshire – 2. The Seat of Mr. Edward Brocklehurst Fielden". Country Life. Vol. 43, no. 1118. London. pp. 530–536.
- Wright, Stephen K. (1989). "The Manuscript of "Sanctus Tewdricus": Rediscovery of a "Lost Miracle Play" from St.Omers". Studies in Bibliography. 42. Bibliographical Society of the University of Virginia: 236–245. JSTOR 40371909.
