= RAF Condover =

Former RAF base in Shropshire, England

RAF Condover
- Located Near Shrewsbury, Shropshire, England
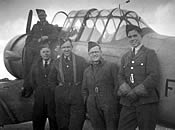
- Trainee air navigators at RAF Condover May 1945, standing next to a North American Harvard

Site information
- Type: Disestablished Military Airfield
- Code: AP
- Owner: Privately
- Controlled by: Royal Air Force
- Condition: Technical site now used as a Trading Estate, Control tower still stands. Runways removed.

Location
- Location within Shropshire
- Coordinates: 52.635°N 2.7313°W

Site history
- Built: 1942
- In use: 1942–1945
- Demolished: 1960
- Battles/wars: European Theatre of World War II; Air Offensive, Europe July 1942 – May 1945

Garrison information
- Garrison: RAF Flying Training Command

Royal Air Force Condover or more simply RAF Condover is a former Royal Air Force station air navigation training establishment that operated between August 1942 and June 1945, unusually for both fighter and bomber crews at different times. Located on the southern outskirts of Condover village in Shropshire, 4.9 miles (7.9 km) south of the county town Shrewsbury.

Condover was utilised by Flying Training Command to train fighter pilots by the RAF and the USAAF as well as pilots and air navigators from Australia, South Africa and Canada.

Although the runways have now been broken up and removed, many original station buildings still stand and the control tower is considered to be one of the best-preserved in Shropshire. After many years as a major part of a local riding school several of the buildings and land plots were offered for sale by auction during the summer of 2007.

== History ==
The station formally opened on 21 August 1942 with three new concrete runways designed for both fighter and bomber aircraft. The airfield was originally planned as a Relief Landing Ground (RLG) and satellite to RAF Atcham but by the time it was completed Atcham had been handed over to the United States Air Force as a fighter base, so Condover was instead established as a satellite airfield under RAF Shawbury, also serving as an RLG for RAF Ternhill. Although it had a large layout for a satellite field it remained mostly under utilised throughout its existence during World War II .

The airfield's three runways, two short and one long runway for heavier bomber aircraft were poorly constructed and the station closed for runway repairs on more than one occasion during the three-year span of its operational career. There were ten hangars erected, a single Type T1 and 9 prefabricated blister type. Airmen and WAAF personnel were accommodated in prefabricated Quonset hutting and the officers were housed in the nearby magnificent Elizabethan manor house, Condover Hall, that had been commandeered by the War Office for the duration of the war.

The first unit at Condover was No. 11 (Pilot) Advanced Flying Unit, of No. 21 Group Flying Training Command, flying Airspeed Oxfords and conducting navigation and cross-country training. At various times between 1942 and 1945 Condover was visited by Supermarine Spitfires, Hawker Hurricanes, Short Stirlings and Avro Lancasters that either diverted to Condover, made emergency landings or overnighted at the station. In January 1945 new North American Harvard trainer aircraft arrived at the airfield but were removed again by June the same year, when the airfield closed. The station was retained by the RAF on a care and maintenance basis until 1960 when it was sold by auction.

== Notable incidents ==
Only three months after the station opened a Pathfinder force Avro Lancaster bomber made an emergency wheels up landing here and the airfield was temporarily closed for essential runway repairs when the brittle concrete surfaces were damaged.

On 5 August 1942, just before the station opened Supermarine Spitfire Mark Vb No. AA 928 of No. 411 (F) Squadron, RCAF made a wheels up crash landing at Condover following a catastrophic engine failure. The formal RAF enquiry later noted: "Category B damage in a flying accident on 5 August 1942, wheels up landing following an engine failure. Failure of big end bearings in No 2 and 5 pistons. Pilot unable to select wheels down until a suitable landing ground found and then under carriage selector lever stuck and he had neither time nor height to free it. Successful recovery under difficult situation. Aircraft landed at Condover field in Shropshire, which was still under construction at the time."

On 8 May 1945 a Tiger Moth DH82A of Training Command crash landed at Condover and was a total write off. The pilot was severely injured but survived.

== RAF Condover memories ==
By the end of 1944 there were 660 RAF and several hundred Women's Auxiliary Air Force (WAAF) personnel stationed at RAF Condover.

Mary Churchill, a WAAF Flight Officer during the war, recounted to the BBC in 2005:

"I was posted to various stations as a relief officer for a while and then settled at the satellite station of RAF Shawbury, Shropshire named RAF Condover. There were only 9 WAAF Officers stationed there with over 200 girls in various trades. The WAAFs were billeted in a hutted camp, very widely dispersed – we had bikes to get round from our living quarters to the working areas and on to the aerodrome. When we were Duty Officers we had to report to the C.O. in the mornings for instructions and dip our hands in a bag and pull out a time disc. This was the time we had to go up to the aerodrome and see if the WAAF were doing their duties – during night flying time.

I met my future husband there at the Cadbury's Caravan *. He was a pilot and at the time Condover was a Training School for Navigation personnel. We had intakes from Canada, South Africa, Australia as well as from the UK.

(* Note: Donated by the Cadbury family of Bournville as a NAAFI canteen)

== POW camp ==
During the latter part of the war a Prisoner of War (POW) camp was established at the western end of the station and the former WAAF accommodation hutting used to house German prisoners, mostly shot down and captured Luftwaffe airmen. The entrance to the camp site was at OS Map Ref: SJ 4908 0423 with the main camp on the northern side of the road. The German prisoners were still housed there awaiting repatriation until early 1947. The prisoners were utilised as farm labourers in the local area and several remained in the Shrewsbury area after the war and settled in the UK.

== Present day ==
For the past forty years most of the airfield has been used for grazing by horses from the nearby Berriewood stables and riding school, with its cross country competition course. A large number of the original buildings remain, including the old control tower, a hangar and various ruins. The main runways were torn up and used as hard-core ballast during the building of the M54 motorway and the extension to the A5 through Shrewsbury, but some of the airfield's perimeter track remains.

The station's technical site on the opposite side of the road is now in use as Condover Industrial Estate, utilising many of the original buildings including the parachute packing shed.

Offered for sale by auction in May 2007 the concrete-built control tower, which extends to 140 square metres, was described by officials from Shrewsbury and Atcham Borough Council as being of notable historical interest and worthy of retention under a suitable new use. An employee of the auction agents said: “The opportunity exists to explore a wide range of alternative uses for the tower, subject to planning permission, the tower is being offered together with 6.6 acres of pastureland and there are two other buildings, which are in a poorer condition but could be improved."

The southern and eastern extents of the site are now largely utilised as a Solar Farm, which was constructed in 2015.

== RAF units and aircraft ==
| Unit | Dates | Aircraft | Variant | Notes |
|---|---|---|---|---|
| No. 5 (Pilots) Advanced Flying Unit RAF | Feb 1944 – January 1945 January 1945 – June 1945 | Miles Master North American Harvard | | Based at RAF Ternhill used Condover as a Relief Landing Ground |
| No. 11 (Pilots) Advanced Flying Unit RAF | May 1942 – Feb 1944 | Airspeed Oxford | | Based at RAF Shawbury used Condover as a Relief Landing Ground |

== See also ==
- Condover Hall
- Condover airfield photographs
