= Red Pottage (film) =

- Directed by: Meyrick Milton
- Written by: Mary Cholmondeley (novel); Eliot Stannard
- Starring: C. Aubrey Smith; Mary Dibley; Gerald Ames; Marjorie Hume
- Production company: Ideal Film Company
- Distributed by: Ideal Film Company
- Release date: June 1918
- Country: United Kingdom
- Language: English

Red Pottage is a 1918 British silent drama film directed by Meyrick Milton and starring C. Aubrey Smith, Mary Dibley and Gerald Ames. It is an adaptation of the 1899 novel Red Pottage by Mary Cholmondeley.

== Cast ==
- C. Aubrey Smith as Lord Newhaven
- Mary Dibley as Lady Newhaven
- Gerald Ames as Hugh Scarlett
- E. Holman Clark as Bishop
- Marjorie Hume as Rachel West
