= Red Pottage (novel) =

1899 novel by Mary Cholmondeley

Red Pottage is an 1899 novel by English author Mary Cholmondeley.

== The subject of the novel ==
Red Pottage follows a period in the lives of two friends, Rachel West and Hester Gresley. Rachel is a wealthy heiress who falls in love with the weak-willed Hugh Scarlett after he has broken off an affair with Lady Newhaven (which he does not originally realise has been discovered by her husband). Hester, a novelist, lives with her judgmental brother, the pompous vicar of the fictional village of Warpington. Hester's brother disapproves of her writing and eventually burns the manuscript of a novel she has been writing. This leads Hester into a prolonged nervous illness. Scarlett who has not been entirely frank with Rachel about his past commits suicide when his dishonourable behaviour is revealed to her and she breaks off their engagement.

== History ==
Red Pottage caused a scandal when it was first published, in 1899, due to its themes of adultery, the emancipation of women and its satire of the clergy. It was adapted into a silent film in 1918 by Meyrick Milton starring C. Aubrey Smith, Mary Dibley and Gerald Ames. The novel has been republished several times since the 1960s.

== See also ==
- Cholmondeley, Mary. Red Pottage, (e-book), University of Adelaide website, accessed 21 September 2015.
