= Mary Cholmondeley =

English novelist (1859–1925)

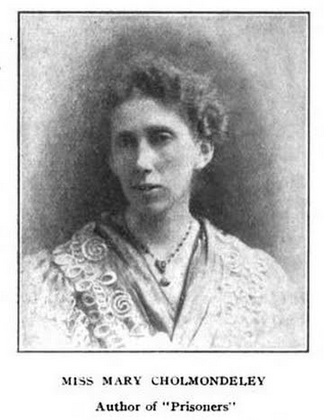
- Cholmondeley, from a 1906 publication
- Born: 8 June 1859; Hodnet, Shropshire, England
- Died: 15 July 1925 (aged 66); Kensington, London, England
- Occupation: Novelist
- Notable work: Red Pottage (1899)
- Parents: Richard Hugh Cholmondeley; Emily Beaumont
- Relatives: Reginald Cholmondeley (uncle)
- Family: Cholmondeley

Mary Cholmondeley (/ˈtʃʌmli/ CHUM-lee; 8 June 1859 – 15 July 1925) was an English novelist. Her bestseller Red Pottage satirised religious hypocrisy and the narrowness of country life. It was adapted as a silent film in 1918.

== Family ==
Mary Cholmondeley was born at Hodnet near Market Drayton in Shropshire, the third of eight children of Rev Richard Hugh Cholmondeley (1827–1910) and his wife Emily Beaumont (1831–1893). Her great-uncle was a hymn-writing bishop, Reginald Heber, and her niece a writer, Stella Benson. An uncle, Reginald Cholmondeley of Condover Hall, was a host of the American novelist Mark Twain on his visits to England. Her sister Hester, who died in 1892, wrote poetry and kept a journal: selections appear in Mary's family memoir, Under One Roof (1918).

After brief periods in Farnborough, Warwickshire and Leaton, Shropshire, the family returned to Hodnet when her father took over from his father as rector in 1874. Much of the first 30 years of her life passed in helping her sickly mother to run the household and her father to do his parish work, although she herself suffered from asthma. She entertained her brothers and sisters with stories from an early age.

After her father retired in 1896, she moved with him and her sister Diana to Condover Hall, which he had inherited from Reginald. They sold it and moved to Albert Gate Mansions in Knightsbridge, London. After her father died, she lived with her sister Victoria, moving between Ufford, Suffolk, and 2 Leonard Place, Kensington. During the war she did clerical work at the Carlton House Terrace Hospital. The sisters moved in 1919 to 4 Argyll Road, Kensington, where Mary died unmarried on 15 July 1925, aged 66.

== Writings ==
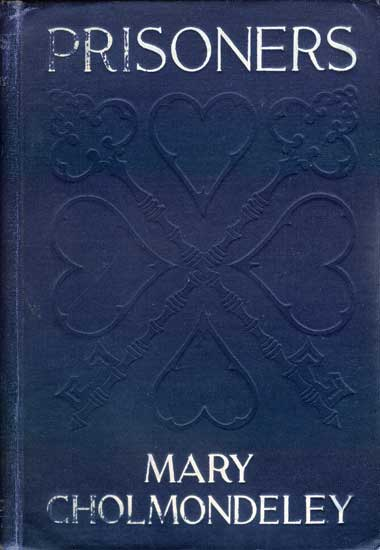
Cover of Prisoners, by Mary Cholmondeley, 1906

Cholmondeley began writing with serious intent in her teens. She wrote in her journal in 1877, "What a pleasure and interest it would be to me in life to write books. I must strike out a line of some kind, and if I do not marry (for at best that is hardly likely, as I possess neither beauty nor charms) I should want some definite occupation, besides the home duties." She placed initially some stories in The Graphic and elsewhere. Her first novel was The Danvers Jewels (1887), a detective story that won a small following. It appeared in the Temple Bar magazine published by Richard Bentley, after fellow novelist Rhoda Broughton had introduced her to George Bentley. It was followed by Sir Charles Danvers (1889), Diana Tempest (1893) and A Devotee (1897). Bentley paid £40 for The Danvers Jewels and £50 for Sir Charles Danvers, both in two volumes, but increased an offer of £250 for the three-volume Diana Tempest to £400, the first of her books to appear under her name.

The satirical Red Pottage (1899) sold well both sides of the Atlantic and is still reprinted. It satirises religious hypocrisy and the narrowness of country life, but was denounced from a London pulpit as immoral. It was equally sensational when exploring "the issues of female sexuality and vocation", recurring topics in late Victorian debates about the New Women. Despite the book's great success, however, the author received little money for it later as she had sold the copyright. A silent film, Red Pottage, was made in 1918.

Diana Tempest was reissued in 2009 for the first time in a century.

Later works such as Moth and Rust (1902) and Notwithstanding (1913) were less successful. The Lowest Rung (1908) and The Romance of his Life (1921) were story collections. The latter, her final book, was dedicated to the essayist and critic Percy Lubbock. Lubbock later commemorated her in Mary Cholmondeley: A Sketch from Memory (1928).

== Selected works ==
- Her Evil Genius (c. 1875, unpublished, assumed burnt 1896)
- The Danvers Jewels (1886)
- Sir Charles Danvers (1889)
- Let Loose (1890)
- Diana Tempest (1893)
- A Devotee: An Episode in the Life of a Butterfly (1897)
- Red Pottage (1899)
- Moth and Rust (1902)
- Prisoners (1906)
- The Lowest Rung (1908)
- Notwithstanding (American title: After All, 1913)
- Under One Roof (1917)
- The Romance of His Life (1921)
