= Richard Onslow (Royal Navy officer) =

Royal Navy Admiral (1904–1975)

Admiral Sir Richard Onslow KCB DSO & Three Bars DL
- Born: 15 April 1904; Garmston, Shropshire
- Died: 16 December 1975 (aged 71); Great Ryton, Dorrington, Shropshire
- Military career
- Allegiance: United Kingdom
- Branch: Royal Navy
- Service years: 1918–1962
- Rank: Admiral
- Commands: Plymouth Command (1958–61); Reserve Fleet (1956–58); HMS Devonshire (1951–52); 4th Destroyer Flotilla (1943–45); HMS Quilliam (1943–45); HMS Osprey (1943); HMS Ashanti (1941–42); HMS Gipsy (1937–38)
- Conflicts: First World War; Second World War
- Awards: Knight Commander of the Order of the Bath; Companion of the Distinguished Service Order & Three Bars; Mentioned in Despatches; Order of the Red Banner (Soviet Union); Order of the Sword (Sweden)

Admiral Sir Richard George Onslow, KCB, DSO & Three Bars, DL (15 April 1904 – 16 December 1975) was a Royal Navy officer who served as Commander-in-Chief, Plymouth.

== Early life and family ==
Onslow was born in 1904 at Garmston (near Ironbridge), Shropshire, second child and eldest son of George Arthur Onslow, farmer, and his wife Charlotte Riou Benson, daughter of clergyman the Reverend Riou George Benson.

In 1932, Onslow married Kathleen Meriel Taylor, elder daughter of Edmund Coston Taylor, cotton manufacturer, of Bank House, Longnor, Shropshire; they had two sons.

== Naval career ==
Educated at the Royal Naval College, Osborne and the Royal Naval College, Dartmouth, Onslow joined the Royal Navy in 1918 at the end of the First World War. He attended the Royal Naval College, Greenwich from 1934 to 1935.

At the start of the Second World War Onslow was on the Plans Division of the Naval Staff, with a combat interlude in 1940 on an unsuccessful attempt to evacuate the Belgian government and gold reserves from Bordeaux during the Fall of France, nearly becoming prisoner of the Germans. He next became captain of the destroyer HMS Ashanti in 1941 in the role of defending Russian convoys, as well as the convoys to Malta. His services on the former convoys earned him his initial appointment as a Companion of the Distinguished Service Order (DSO) and the Soviet Order of the Red Banner. He took over the anti-submarine training establishment HMS Osprey in 1943 and went on to be captain of the 4th Destroyer Flotilla in November, in which capacity he earned the third of his three bars to his DSO insignia in the attack on a Japanese base at Sabang, Sumatra.

After the war Onslow attended the Imperial Defence College in London, and then became Senior Naval Officer in Northern Ireland and then, from 1948, Director of the Tactical Division at the Admiralty. After taking command of the training ship HMS Devonshire in 1951, he became Naval Secretary in 1952. He was made Flag Officer (Flotillas) for the Home Fleet in 1955 and Flag Officer commanding the Reserve Fleet in 1956. His last appointment was as Commander-in-Chief, Plymouth in 1958. He retired in 1962.

In retirement Onslow became a Deputy Lieutenant for Shropshire on 13 April 1962 and served until his death. He settled in Shropshire after retirement, making his home at Ryton Grove, Great Ryton, near Dorrington, where he died on 16 December 1975.

Military offices
Preceded by William Davis	Naval Secretary; 1952–1954	Succeeded by David Luce
Preceded by Sir Peter Cazalet	Commander-in-Chief, Reserve Fleet; 1956–1958	Succeeded by Sir Guy Sayer
Preceded by Sir Charles Pizey	Commander-in-Chief, Plymouth; 1958–1961	Succeeded by Sir Charles Madden
