= Cecil Thursby =

Royal Navy Admiral; Commander-in-Chief, Plymouth (1861–1936)

Admiral Sir Cecil Thursby KCB KCMG DL JP
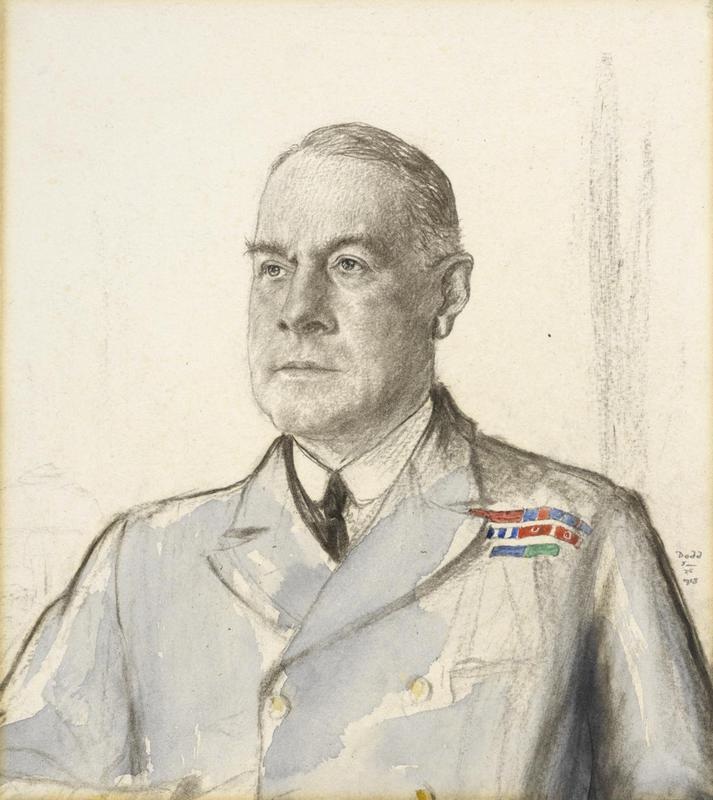
- 1918 portrait by Francis Dodd
- Born: 16 January 1861; Warwickshire
- Died: 28 May 1936 (age 75); Great Ryton, Dorrington, Shropshire
- Military career
- Allegiance: United Kingdom
- Branch: Royal Navy
- Service years: 1874 – 1920
- Rank: Admiral
- Commands: HMS King Alfred; HMS Swiftsure; 3rd Battle Squadron; 5th Battle Squadron; 2nd Squadron; British Adriatic Squadron; East Mediterranean; Coastguards and Reserves; Plymouth Command
- Conflicts: World War I
- Awards: Knight Commander of the Order of the Bath; Knight Commander of the Order of St Michael and St George

Admiral Sir Cecil Fiennes Thursby, KCB, KCMG, DL, JP (17 January 1861 – 28 May 1936) was a Royal Navy officer who went on to be Commander-in-Chief, Plymouth, after serving in World War I mainly in the Mediterranean Sea.

== Family ==
Thursby was born in Warwickshire, son of Church of England clergyman the Reverend Walter Thursby (died 1868).

He married in 1899 Constance Ann, daughter of Cressett Thursby-Pelham of Cound, Shropshire. The couple had a son and daughter.

== Naval career ==
Thursby joined the Royal Navy, aged twelve, in 1874, training on HMS Britannia. He was present as a midshipman during the engagement with the Peruvian rebel ship Huáscar in 1877 and also took part in the Niger expedition in 1882, as well as the Suakim Expedition to the Sudan in 1884-85 as Lieutenant aboard HMS Tyne. In 1890, he earned a certificate from the Royal Humane Society for rescuing a drowning man off Cowes, Isle of Wight. From April 1899 to January 1902 he was in command of the training brig HMS St Vincent, based at Portsmouth.

Promoted captain on 31 December 1901, he was appointed in command of the battleship HMS Triumph on 16 July 1902. He commanded the cruiser HMS King Alfred and later the battleship HMS Swiftsure, from which he commanded a detached squadron in the eastern Mediterranean during a time of massacres by Turks in Asia Minor in 1909, gaining the thanks of the Admiralty and Foreign Office for protecting life and property. He commanded the International Squadron in Crete in August 1909, earning thanks from four Great Powers for pacifying the island (which had not long united with Greece) and became Commodore at the Royal Naval Barracks at Chatham later that year. He went on to be Rear Admiral commanding the 3rd Battle Squadron in 1912.

He served in World War I initially commanding his squadron in protecting the first movements of the British Expeditionary Force to France in 1914, before deploying to the Mediterranean as Commander of the 5th Battle Squadron in the Dardanelles and then as Commander of the 2nd Squadron landing ANZAC forces at Gaba Tepe in Gallipoli in 1915. He commanded the British Adriatic Squadron in 1916, when it helped evacuate retreating Serbian troops, before becoming Commander-in-Chief, East Mediterranean later that year. In the latter post he was in charge of blockading the Dardanelles and the Turkish and Bulgarian coasts and protecting supply lines to Salonika. He became Commander of the Coastguards and Reserves in 1918.

For his services in the war Thursby was mentioned in despatches five times, including by General Sir Ian Hamilton at Gallipoli, and received the following foreign allied honours:

- Grand Officer, Order of St Maurice and St Lazarus (Italy) (1917)
- Grand Cross, Order of the White Eagle (Serbia)
- Commander, Legion of Honour (France) (1918)
- Grand Commander, Order of the Redeemer (Greece) (1918)
- Grand Cross, Order of the Rising Sun (Japan).

After the War he became Commander-in-Chief, Plymouth and retired in 1920.

== Retirement ==
After retirement he settled in Shropshire, making his home at The Styche, Great Ryton, near Dorrington. He became in 1922 a J.P. for the county, at one point being chairman of Condover Petty Sessions, and a Deputy Lieutenant in 1923. He was a director of the Royal Salop Infirmary at Shrewsbury and chairman of Condover Parish Council.

A few weeks after a successful operation, he died at his home in May 1936. He was buried at St Peter's Church, Cound, on 31 May.

Military offices
Preceded by Sir Alexander Bethell	Commander-in-Chief, Plymouth; 1918–1920	Succeeded by Sir Montague Browning
