= Leebotwood =

Village in Shropshire, England

Coordinates: 52.583°N 2.775°W

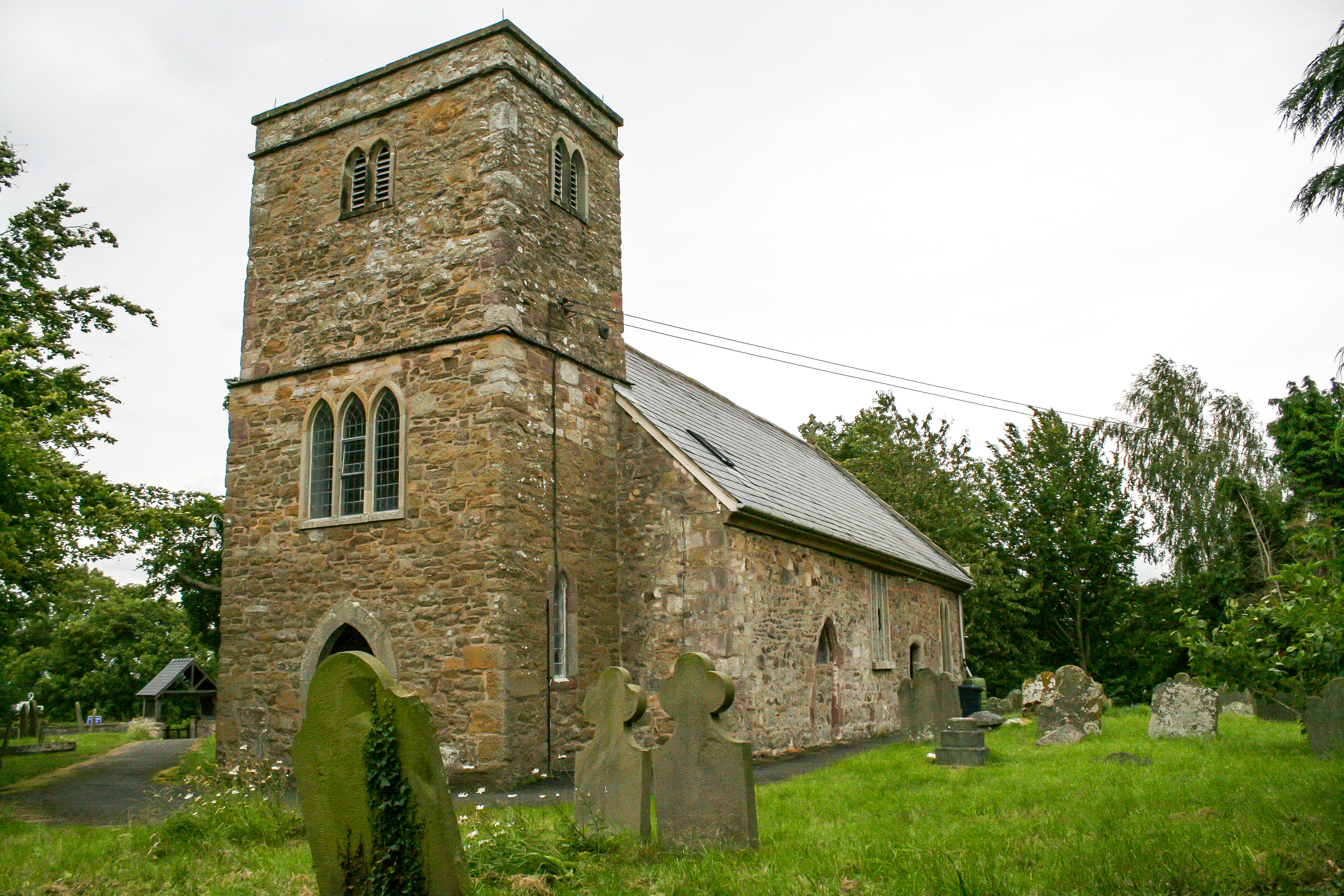
- St Mary's Church, the parish church

- Location within Shropshire
- Population: 231 (2011)
- OS grid reference: SO 475 986
- Civil parish: Leebotwood
- Unitary authority: Shropshire
- Ceremonial county: Shropshire
- Region: West Midlands
- Country: England
- Sovereign state: United Kingdom
- Post town: Church Stretton
- Postcode district: SY6
- Dialling code: 01694
- Police: West Mercia
- Fire: Shropshire
- Ambulance: West Midlands
- UK Parliament: South Shropshire

Leebotwood (/liːbɒtwʊd/ lee-BOT-wood) is a small village and civil parish in Shropshire, England. It is about 9 miles (14 km) south of Shrewsbury and 3.5 miles (5.6 km) north of Church Stretton.

== Geography ==
The village is located on the A49 road, north of Church Stretton and south of the village of Dorrington. Nearby villages include Longnor (approximately 1½ miles to the north) and All Stretton which is 2 miles distant, between Leebotwood and Church Stretton.

Leebotwood is the only recognisable settlement in the parish.

The Cound Brook passes through the village, flowing north towards Longnor.

The parish was part of the borough of Shrewsbury and Atcham, which existed 1973–2009. It is now part of the Parliamentary constituency of South Shropshire and in the area of Shropshire's unitary Council in Burnell ward.

== Transport ==
The Welsh Marches railway line runs through the parish. Leebotwood once had its own small railway station that closed in 1958.

Today, the nearest station is Church Stretton. Northbound trains run to Shrewsbury and most continue to destinations such as Manchester Piccadilly and Holyhead. Southbound trains run mostly to Cardiff and beyond via the Welsh Marches Line.

== History ==
Leebotwood's parish church (St Mary's) dates from the 12th century (oldest parts 13th century) and is a plain and simple building in comparison to its many neighbouring churches, including Church Stretton's St Laurence's Church. It is the burial place of the Corbett family of Longnor Hall, the local lords of the manor.

A valley between Leebotwood and Caer Caradoc was important as a thoroughfare dating right back to Roman times. The eastern boundary of the village was formed from the ancient route of Watling Street which is still visible today. Caer Caradoc to the south of Leebotwood rises to a height of 1506 ft and is said to be one of the last strongholds of the native chief "Caradoc" or "Caractacus" who held out against the Romans.

=== Etymology ===
The whole area was covered in thick forest, called "Botwde" (as the area was recorded in the Domesday Book) or "Bottewode" (as written in 1170) until later in medieval times. Henry II granted this area to Augustinian canons with a chapel at Lega - hence the placename of "Lega in Bottewode" (1170) and in modern times "Leebotwood". Nearby, in the parish of Church Stretton, is Botvyle, which also derives its name from the historic forest.

== Present day ==
=== Local businesses ===
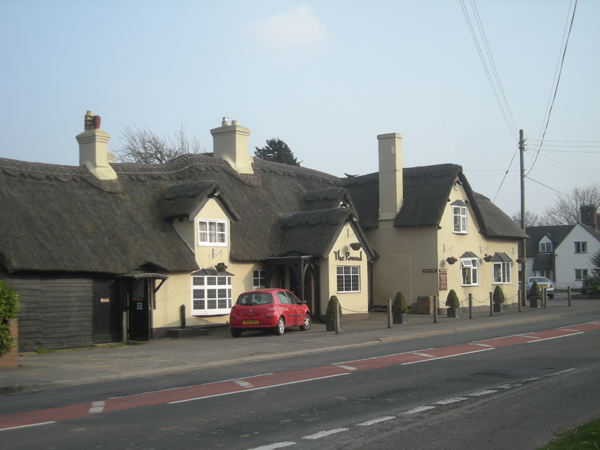
The Pound public house, with its thatched roof, on the A49 road.

The village has a thatched public house called The Pound, the Copper Kettle tea room, a farm shop and a village hall that offers internet use.

There are multiple mixed farms (livestock and dairy) around the village.

Leebotwood is home to a large branch of Huws Gray, a builders' merchant.

== Notable people ==
- Bert Harry (1897–1966), professional footballer, notably for Crystal Palace, was landlord of The Pound public house from 1935 to 1954 and is buried in Leebotwood churchyard.
- Katherine Plymley (1758–1829), diarist, traveller and naturalist, buried at Leebotwood church.

== See also ==
- Listed buildings in Leebotwood
