= Listed buildings in Condover =

Condover is a civil parish in Shropshire, England. It contains 92 listed buildings that are recorded in the National Heritage List for England. Of these, one is listed at Grade I, the highest of the three grades, four are at Grade II*, the middle grade, and the others are at Grade II, the lowest grade. The parish contains the villages of Condover, Dorrington, Great Ryton, and Stapleton, and smaller settlements, but is mainly rural. Most of the listed buildings are houses, cottages, farmhouses and farm buildings, the earliest of which are timber framed, some with cruck construction. The most important building in the parish is the country house Condover Hall; this and associated structures are listed. The other listed buildings include churches and items in the churchyards, bridges, public houses, and a war memorial.

== Key ==
Grade	Criteria
I	Buildings of exceptional interest, sometimes considered to be internationally important
II*	Particularly important buildings of more than special interest
II	Buildings of national importance and special interest

== Buildings ==
Name and location	Photograph	Date	Notes	Grade
Church of St Mary and St Andrew; 52.64738°N 2.74845°W		Late 12th century	The tower collapsed in 1660, and the nave and tower were rebuilt in 1662–64, the chancel was rebuilt in 1868, and the church was restored in 1877–78. The church is in sandstone with tile roofs, and consists of a nave with a north porch, north and south transepts, a chancel with a south vestry and organ chamber, and a north chapel, and a west tower. The tower has three stages, diagonal buttresses, an integral stair turret with a domed cap, clock faces, a three-light west window, and an embattled parapet with crocketed corner pinnacles.	II*
Church of St John the Baptist, Stapleton; 52.63566°N 2.78348°W		c. 1200	The church was remodelled in about 1790, the tower was added in about 1840, and the church was restored in 1867 by Slater and Carpenter, who extended the chancel and added the north vestry. The church is built in sandstone with some gritstone, and has a machine tile roof. It originally had two storeys, with an undercroft, and the floor was removed by 1400. It consists of a nave, a chancel, a north vestry, and a west tower. The tower has three stepped stages and an embattled parapet.	II*
1 and 2 Grange Cottages; 52.62660°N 2.75703°W	—	14th century (probable)	A house, later remodelled, extended, and divided into two dwellings. It has a T-shaped plan; No. 2 is a timber framed hall range with red brick infill, and No. 1 is a cross-wing clad in brick, and the roof is tiled. No. 2 has one storey and an attic, and No. 2 has two storeys and a band. Most windows are casements, and there are gabled eaves dormers. Inside No. 2 are two full cruck trusses.	II
4 and 5 Church Street; 52.64790°N 2.74915°W	—	14th or 15th century (probable)	Originally an open hall house, timber framed with cruck construction, later converted into two cottages that are encased in brick and rendered. They have a tile roof, one storey and an attic, and a dentilled eaves cornice. There are four casement windows, and two gabled dormers, and inside are two cruck trusses.	II
7 Church Street; 52.64817°N 2.74988°W		14th or 15th century (probable)	An open hall house that was remodelled and altered in the 19th and 20th centuries. It is timber framed with cruck construction and a tile roof, and was later encased in brick, partly rendered and partly roughcast. There are two storeys and three bays. In the ground floor is a 20th-century shop front with a segmental-headed doorway to the left, and the windows are 20th-century casements with segmental heads. Inside are three true cruck trusses.	II
Condover Court; 52.64982°N 2.74899°W	—	14th or 15th century	The house was remodelled in the 17th century and later extended, particularly in 1876–77. It is timber framed with plaster and brick infill, partly of cruck construction, and has tile roofs. It has two storeys, and consists of a four-bay hall range, a cross-wing to the right with a jettied upper floor, and extensions to the rear. The windows are mullioned or mullioned and transomed, there is a bay window, and two full gabled dormers. There is a lean-to porch, and on the cross-wing is a datestone. Inside are three true cruck trusses.	II
Moat Farmhouse; 52.62659°N 2.80333°W	—	14th or 15th century	The farmhouse was remodelled in the 17th century and later altered. It is timber framed on a chamfered sandstone plinth, it is encased in brick, partly rendered, and has a slate roof. The house consists of a hall range and a cross-wing to the northeast, and there are two storeys with a cellar to the south. The windows are casements, those on the ground floor with segmental heads. On the front is a gabled porch, and there is a lean-to porch in the angle.	II*
Revetment wall, Moat Farm; 52.62634°N 2.80349°W	—	14th or 15th century (probable)	The revetment wall is in sandstone with some repairs in brick. It is between about 3 metres (9.8 ft) and 4.5 metres (15 ft) high, and encloses an area of about 80 square metres (860 sq ft). The southwest corner provides a plinth for Moat Farmhouse.	II
Wheat Hall; 52.62953°N 2.74480°W	—	Late 14th or early 15th century	The farmhouse was remodelled in 1721. The original rear part is timber framed with cruck construction, later encased in red brick, with a tile roof, and it consists of a hall range, service bays, and a cross-wing. The front range added in 1721 is in brick, with two storeys and an attic, and three bays. It has bands, a dentilled eaves cornice and sash windows. In the centre is a doorway with pilasters and a rectangular fanlight.	II
Church House; 52.64760°N 2.74908°W	—	15th century	The house was remodelled and extended in the 17th century. It is timber framed with cruck construction, plaster infill and a tile roof, and has been encased in brick. The house has a cruciform plan, consisting of a two-bay hall range, cross-wings to the south, and a later range further to the south with a sandstone cellar. There are two storeys, the hall range has a dentilled eaves cornice, and the windows are casements. Inside is one true cruck truss and an inglenook fireplace.	II
The School House; 52.65040°N 2.74963°W	—	Mid-15th century	The house is timber framed with partial cruck construction, brick infill, and a tile roof. There are two storeys, and it consists of a truncated one-bay hall range and a two-bay north wing. The hall range has been clad in brick. The windows are casements, and there is a gabled porch with an ogee outer arch and a pointed finial. Part of cruck blade is visible at the southeast corner.	II
Yew Tree Cottage; 52.64890°N 2.74970°W	—	15th century (probable)	A farmhouse, later a private house, it was remodelled in the 17th century. The house is timber framed with cruck construction, it has brick infill, it is encased in brick, and has a tile roof. The house consists of a three or four-bay hall range and a two-bay cross-wing on the right. There is one storey and an attic, and the hall range has a dentilled eaves cornice. The windows are casements with segmental heads, there are two gabled dormers, and the porch is in the angle. Inside are three true cruck trusses.	II
Farmhouse, Home Farm; 52.64394°N 2.74325°W	—	Early 16th century	The farmhouse has been subsequently altered. It is basically timber framed with cruck construction, and in brick, now rendered. and it has tile roofs. There are two storeys and three bays, a gabled porch, and three-light windows. Inside are small areas of exposed wattle and daub in a partition wall.	II
Condover Hall; 52.64636°N 2.74774°W		1598	A country house in Elizabethan style, it was remodelled in the 19th century, and later used as a school. It is in red sandstone with dressings in yellow sandstone and tiled roofs with coped verges. There are two storeys with gabled attics, an E-shaped plan with a central two-storey porch, a moulded band, and a moulded eaves cornice. On the front are nine bays, the windows are mullioned and transomed, and in the wings and porch are canted bay windows. The round-arched doorway has a pediment on Doric columns, and above it is a coat of arms.	I
The Cruciform House; 52.64586°N 2.74679°W	—	c. 1598	The house is in pink sandstone on a chamfered plinth, and has a tile roof with coped verges. It has a cruciform plan, two storeys and attics. The windows are mullioned, some with moulded hood moulds.	II
Netley Old Hall; 52.61185°N 2.79005°W	—	Late 16th or early 17th century	The farmhouse was later remodelled and extended. The original part is timber framed with plaster infill and the extension is in brick, on a sandstone plinth and with machine tile roofs. The original house had an L-shaped plan, and the extension consisted of a long range added in the angle. The house has two storeys, attics and cellars, a three-bay front, a band, and a dentil eaves cornice. Steps lead up to the central doorway that has a rectangular fanlight and a pediment, and the windows are sashes.	II
Scalloped basin 52.64741°N 2.74881°W	—	Late 16th or 17th century (possible)	The basin is in the churchyard of the Church of St Mary and St Andrew. It is in sandstone, wide and scalloped, and set on a moulded stone base.	II
Chatford Farmhouse; 52.64607°N 2.78115°W	—	Early 17th century (probable)	The farmhouse is timber framed and largely rendered and encased in brick, and it has a tile roof. There is one storey and an attic, and the house consists of a two-bay hall range with a dentil eaves cornice, a gabled cross-wing projecting on the left, and a later extension at the rear. The windows are casements, those in the ground floor of the hall range with segmental heads, and there is a gable eaves dormer. On the cross-wing is a trellised porch.	II
Barn south of Hill Top Farmhouse; 52.62834°N 2.75742°W	—	Early 17th century	The barn is timber framed and weatherboarded, partly rebuilt in red brick and with a tile roof. It contains doorways, windows and gabled eaves dormers, and in the right gable end are air vents. (Note: Street View in April 2009 shows that the barn has been converted for residential use.)	II
The Forge; 52.62123°N 2.77251°W	—	Early 17th century (probable)	Originally stables and a blacksmith's workshop, it is timber framed on a brick plinth with brick infill and a machine tile roof. It has two storeys, four bays and wide doorways. (Note: Street View in July 2016 shows that the building has been converted for residential use.)	II
Yew Tree Farmhouse; 52.62720°N 2.75726°W	—	Early 17th century	A farmhouse, later a private house, it is timber framed with infill in plaster and brick, and has a tile roof. There are two storeys, a two-bay hall range, a slightly projecting cross-wing on the right, and a porch in the angle. The windows are casements.	II
3 and 4 The Square; 52.62038°N 2.77027°W	—	17th century	A house that has been extended, and divided into two dwellings. The original part is timber framed with infill in plaster and brick, extensions in brick, and a tile roof. It has one storey and an attic, originally there were two bays, with a later extension to the left. There is one sash window, the other windows are casements, and there are three tile-hung gabled eaves dormers.	II
Hill Top Farmhouse; 52.62854°N 2.75733°W	—	17th century (probable)	The house was refaced in the 18th century and later altered and extended. It is partly roughcast and partly in brick, with tile roofs and a moulded parapet at the front. There are two storeys and attics, with a front of two bays containing sash windows. At the rear is a lower range with casement windows and two gabled eaves dormers, and a later lean-to at the rear.	II
Lower Fold; 52.62010°N 2.76997°W	—	17th century	A house that was extended in the 19th century and divided into five cottages. The original part is timber framed with red brick infill, partly rendered, the extension is in brick, and there are machine tile roofs. It has one storey and attics, and consists of a long four-bay range, a gabled range, and an extension at the rear. The windows are casements, and there are three gabled eaves dormers.	II
Lower Netley Farmhouse; 52.61724°N 2.79198°W	—	17th century (probable)	The farmhouse was extended in the 19th century. The original part is timber framed with brick infill, it has been partly rebuilt in red brick, and has tiled roofs. It has one storey and an attic, and four bays. The extension to the rear has two storeys, two bays and two gables. The windows are casements with segmental heads, and there are two gabled dormers.	II
Middle Shadymoor Farmhouse; 52.62007°N 2.79925°W	—	17th century	The farmhouse is timber framed with brick infill, partly replaced in brick, and with a machine tile roof. There is one storey and an attic, and three or four bays. The windows are casements, and there is a raking eaves dormer.	II
Outbuilding north of Moat Farmhouse; 52.62676°N 2.80306°W	—	17th century	Formerly a blacksmith's shop, later used for other purposes, and possibly incorporating medieval stonework, it is timber framed on a plinth of gritstone and sandstone, partly rebuilt in red brick, and has a tile roof. There are two levels, an L-shaped plan, with a main range and a gabled range at right angles, and lean-to extensions.	II
Olde Farmhouse; 52.63440°N 2.78142°W	—	17th century (probable)	The farmhouse is in brick with a tile roof. It has a T-shaped plan, with a hall range, a cross-wing projecting on the right, and a single-storey lean-to in the angle. There are two storeys, with an attic in the cross-wing, a dentilled eaves cornice in the hall range, and dentilled bands in the cross-wing. Above the doorway is a hood on console brackets, and the windows are casements.	II
Barn south of Olde Farmhouse; 52.63413°N 2.78142°W	—	17th century (probable)	The barn is timber framed and weatherboarded with a corrugated iron roof. It has two levels and probably five bays, and contains doorways and two gabled eaves dormers.	II
Farmbuildings northeast of Olde Farmhouse; 52.63471°N 2.78152°W	—	17th century	Two ranges of farm buildings at right angles, with two levels. They are partly timber framed and weatherboarded, and partly in brick. The east range has four bays and a slate roof, and the north range has five bays and a tile roof. The openings include doorways, windows, eaves hatches, and gabled eaves dormers.	II
Rose Cottage; 52.64867°N 2.75001°W	—	17th century	A timber framed cottage with brick infill on a chamfered sandstone plinth with a tile roof. It has one storey and an attic, and three bays. The windows are casements, and there are two raking eaves dormers.	II
Ryton Grange; 52.62729°N 2.75656°W	—	17th century	The farmhouse was later extended. It is partly timber framed and partly in brick, mainly pebbledashed, and has a tile roof. There are two storeys, the original part has four or five bays and a dentilled eaves cornice, and there is a later projecting wing with a crow-stepped gable. The windows are casements.	II
The Bungalow; 52.64822°N 2.74832°W	—	17th century	Originally a farm building, later converted into a cottage, it is timber framed with brick infill and a tile roof. It has one storey and an attic, two casement windows, and two gabled eaves dormers.	II
Barn northwest of Upper Moat Farmhouse; 52.62359°N 2.80815°W	—	17th century	The barn was later extended. It is timber framed, partly weatherboarded and partly with brick infill, and has a corrugated iron roof. Originally with four bays, two bays were added. It contains an eaves hatch and doors of various types.	II
Dorrington Old Hall; 52.62124°N 2.77196°W		Late 17th century	A farmhouse, later extended and used for other purposes, the original part is timber framed with brick infill, the extensions are in brick painted to resemble timber framing, and the roofs are tiled. There is one storey and attics, and the original farmhouse consisted of a hall range and a cross-wing. In the 19th century a three-gabled extension was added at the rear, followed by another extension in the 20th century. The windows are casements, there are two gabled eaves dormers, and two canted bay windows.	II
Two barns northwest of Manor Farmhouse; 52.63521°N 2.78230°W	—	Late 17th century (probable)	The two barns form a linear plan along the roadside. They are timber framed and weatherboarded and have slate roofs. The barn to the north has two eaves hatches.	II
Stables southwest of The Old Vicarage; 52.64815°N 2.75068°W		Late 17th century (probable)	The stables are timber framed with brick infill and a tile roof. There are two levels, and two or three bays, and the stables contain eaves hatches and a doorway.	II
Wheathall Cottage; 52.62799°N 2.74484°W	—	Late 17th century	The cottage is timber framed with brick infill on a brick plinth, and has a machine tile roof. There is one storey and an attic, and two bays. The windows are casements, and at the rear is a lean-to porch and a flat-roofed dormer.	II
Barn northeast of Chatford Farmhouse; 52.64626°N 2.78118°W	—	Late 17th or early 18th century	The barn is timber framed on a sandstone plinth with red brick infill, and was partly rebuilt in the 19th century in red brick. The roof is tiled, there are two levels, and various openings including eaves hatches.	II
Stables and wall, Wheat Hall; 52.62965°N 2.74490°W	—	1720	The stables are in red brick on a sandstone plinth and have a tile roof with crow-stepped gables. They have two storeys, casement windows, and a datestone, and are attached to the hall by a brick wall with moulded stone coping.	II
Westley Farmhouse and pump 52.65145°N 2.78525°W	—	Early to mid 18th century (probable)	The farmhouse was extended in the 19th century. It is in brick with bands and machine tile roofs, and consists of a hall range, a projecting cross-wing to the right, and later extension to the rear. There are two storeys and attics, the windows are casements with segmental heads, and there is a lean-to porch in the angle. Attached to the right return of the cross-wing is a cast iron pump.	II
Grove Farmhouse, Dorrington; 52.62081°N 2.77187°W	—	Mid 18th century	The house, at one time an inn, is the encasement in brick of an earlier house. It is rendered at the front and has a tile roof. There are two storeys, a floor band, and three bays. The central doorway has a rendered porch, and this is flanked by 19th-century bow windows. In the upper floor are casement windows with hood moulds.	II
Wood memorial 52.64728°N 2.74840°W		c. 1770	The memorial is in the churchyard of the Church of St Mary and St Andrew, and is to members of the Wood family. It is in sandstone and consists of a pedestal tomb with a hexagonal plan. The tomb has a moulded plinth and capping, and around the top are six carvings of sheep's skulls with leaf garlands and ribbons. There are painted inscription panels on five sides.	II
Bank House; 52.62211°N 2.77161°W	—	Late 18th century	A brick house with stone-capped square angle piers and a tile roof. There are three storeys, three bays, and a rear wing at the right, forming an L-shaped plan. In the centre is a flat-roofed porch, and a doorway with a fanlight, and the windows are casements with segmental heads.	II
Manor Farmhouse; 52.63505°N 2.78150°W	—	Late 18th century	A red brick farmhouse with a dentilled eaves cornice and a tile roof. There are three storeys, five bays, and a lower rear range on the left. The windows are casements, some are blind, and there is an open lean-to porch.	II
Sundial; 52.64750°N 2.74887°W	—	Late 18th century (probable)	The sundial is in the churchyard of the Church of St Mary and St Andrew. It is in sandstone, and is baluster-shaped with a moulded base and capping. The sundial stands on a stepped square plinth.	II
The Old Rectory and Rectory Cottage; 52.63565°N 2.78448°W	—	Late 18th century	The rectory was considerably extended in about 1830, and has been divided into two dwellings. It is in rendered brick, it has tile roofs with coped verges, and there are two storeys. The original part forms a long low range with seven bays, and the later part is taller with gables. The windows are casements, some with Gothic features. There is a gabled porch, and in the left return is a canted bay window with an embattled parapet.	II
Chatford House; 52.64665°N 2.78156°W	—	1776	A farmhouse incorporating an earlier house, it is in brick with stone quoins, a toothed eaves cornice, and a tile roof with coped verges. There are three storeys, three bays, and a long rear wing on the right. The central bay has a gable containing a datestone, this is flanked by gabled eaves dormers, and the other windows are sashes with projecting keystones. In the centre is a flat-roofed porch on wooden posts, and a doorway with a rectangular fanlight.	II
The Stone House; 52.64796°N 2.74930°W	—	1777	A red brick house with a dentilled eaves cornice, and a tile roof. There are two storeys and an attic, and three bays with a small gable above the central bay containing a datestone. In the centre are double doors under a pediment. The windows are sashes with projecting keystones.	II
1 Church Street; 52.64783°N 2.74888°W	—	1782	A red brick house that has a tiled roof with crow-stepped gables. There is one storey and an attic, above the door is a gabled hood, the windows are casements, and in the left gable end is a datestone.	II
Boreton Farmhouse and stable blocks 52.65528°N 2.72291°W	—	c. 1782	The farmhouse and stable blocks are in red brick. The farmhouse has a double-span slate roof, three storeys, and three bays, and is flanked by lower stable blocks. There is a central Tuscan porch and a doorway with a rectangular fanlight. In the ground floor are two canted bay windows, and in the upper floor the windows are sashes. The attached stable blocks have been altered but have retained their blind elliptical arches.	II
Ivy House; 52.62051°N 2.77178°W	—	1796	A red brick house with a dentil eaves cornice and a slate roof. There are three storeys, three bays, and a lower range at the rear on the left. In the centre is a gabled porch and a doorway with a rectangular fanlight, the windows are casements with segmental heads, and between the upper two floors is a datestone.	II
Dorrington House; 52.62036°N 2.77236°W	—	c. 1800	The house probably incorporates parts of an earlier house. It is in red brick with a coped stone parapet, and a slate roof, hipped to the front. It has three storeys, three bays, a central porch, a doorway that has a rectangular fanlight with Gothic glazing, and sash windows. At the rear is a long range, probably older.	II
Ryton Grove; 52.62598°N 2.75389°W	—	c. 1800	The house is in rendered brick with a moulded stone parapet and a slate roof. There are three storeys and three bays, the central bay projecting as a full-height bow window. To the right is a French window, and the other windows are sashes. The gable ends have carved bargeboards.	II
Willinson memorial 52.64745°N 2.74806°W	—	c. 1800	The memorial is in the churchyard of the Church of St Mary and St Andrew, and is to the memory of Joseph Willinson. It is a rectangular chest tomb in sandstone, and has a moulded plinth and capping, and square corner pilasters. There are two oval inscription panels.	II
Grove Farmhouse, Condover; 52.64114°N 2.75880°W	—	Late 18th or early 19th century	The farmhouse is in sandstone with a dentilled eaves cornice, and a hipped slate roof. There are three storeys and three bays. In the centre is a gabled stone porch with stepped buttresses, and the windows are casements, those in the ground floor with segmental heads.	II
Ice house 52.64449°N 2.74475°W	—	Late 18th or early 19th century (probable)	The ice house is in red brick and is covered in earth. It has a dome about 14 metres (46 ft) in diameter, and a short tunnel with a round-arched entrance, which has been truncated and rebuilt in 20th-century brick.	II
Goff memorial 52.64730°N 2.74853°W	—	c. 1804	The memorial is in the churchyard of the Church of St Mary and St Andrew, and is to the memory members of the Goff family. It is a pedestal tomb in sandstone, and has a square section, a moulded plinth and capping, and two inscription panels.	II
Unidentified chest tomb 52.64739°N 2.74795°W	—	c. 1810	The chest tomb is in the churchyard of the Church of St Mary and St Andrew. It is rectangular and in sandstone, and has a moulded plinth and capping, multi-fluted corner pilasters, and circular moulded panels with rose motifs. The inscription on the moulded panel is illegible.	II
Jones memorial 52.64739°N 2.74795°W	—	c. 1812	The memorial is in the churchyard of the Church of St Mary and St Andrew, and is to the memory of Thomas Jones. It is a rectangular chest tomb in sandstone, and has a moulded plinth and cap, a slightly chamfered top, fluted corner pilasters, and a moulded inscription panel with fluted spandrels.	II
Jones memorial 52.64726°N 2.74812°W	—	c. 1813	The memorial is in the churchyard of the Church of St Mary and St Andrew, and is to the memory of two members of the Jones family. It is a rectangular chest tomb in sandstone, and has a moulded plinth and cap, and fluted corner pilasters. There is a plain inscription panel.	II
Condover Bridge; 52.64791°N 2.75119°W		Early 19th century	The bridge carries a road over the Cound Brook. It is in sandstone and consists of a single segmental arch, with a string course, a coped parapet, and rectangular corner piers.	II
Former Smithy; 52.65072°N 2.75033°W	—	Early 19th century	The former smithy is in sandstone with some brick, and it has a hipped tile roof. There are two storeys, three bays, a central doorway flanked by windows, all with segmental heads, and above are three gabled dormers. (Note: Street View in August 2010 shows that the building has been converted for residential use.)	II
Horseshoes, Dorrington; 52.62097°N 2.77226°W		Early 19th century	A house, later a public house, it is in rendered brick with a tile roof. The main block has three storeys and three bays, with a two-storey two-bay wing to the right, and a one-bay one-storey wing to the left. The central doorway has a rectangular fanlight, and the windows are sashes.	II
Milestone; 52.64820°N 2.75043°W		Early 19th century (probable)	The milestone is set into a garden wall. It is in sandstone and is inscribed with the distance in miles to "SALOP" (Shrewsbury).	II
Farm buildings northwest of Moat Farmhouse; 52.62668°N 2.80475°W	—	Early 19th century {probable)	The farm buildings are in red brick with roofs of tile and asbestos sheet with crow-stepped gables. They have two levels, and are in three ranges, forming a U-shaped plan, and consist of cow houses with cart bays, and a threshing barn. They contain various openings, some with segmental heads, and cross-shaped ventilation holes.	II
Barn southwest of Olde Farmhouse; 52.63412°N 2.78143°W	—	Early 19th century	The barn possibly incorporates earlier material. The main range is in red brick and has two levels, there is a lower timber framed range to the northwest, and the roof is tiled. The openings include double doors, three eaves hatches, and vents in various patterns.	II
Post Office; 52.64967°N 2.74968°W		Early 19th century	A house, later a shop, in red brick with a dentilled eaves cornice, and a tile roof. There are two storeys, three bays, and a single-storey extension to the left. In the centre is a doorway with a trellised porch and a finial. Most of the windows are casements, the middle window in the upper floor is blind and painted to resemble a casement window, and in the extension is a canted bay window.	II
Wayford Bridge; 52.62954°N 2.77663°W	—	Early 19th century	The bridge carries the A49 road over a stream. It is in sandstone, and consists of a single wide segmental arch with rusticated voussoirs, a flat string course, and a coped parapet.	II
Netley Lodge; 52.61507°N 2.77027°W		1826	The lodge is at the entrance to the drive to Netley Hall. It is in rendered brick with dentil eaves cornices, and has a tile roof with coped stone verges and angle piers with pyramidal caps. It consists of a two-storey rectangular main block flanked by single-storey lean-tos. The windows are Gothic casements, and the central doorway has Gothic tracery. In front of the lodge is a shallow pedimented wooden portico with cast iron columns.	II
Gate piers, gates, railings and walls, Netley Lodge; 52.61499°N 2.77023°W	—	c. 1826	The gate piers and walls are in sandstone, and the gates and railings are in wrought iron. There are four square gate piers with pyramidal caps, and the gates and railings are elaborately decorated.	II
Dorrington Grove; 52.61633°N 2.76279°W	—	c. 1830	The house is in roughcast brick, and has a double-span tile roof with gables and carved bargeboards. There are two storeys and attics, and a front of three bays, the outer bays gabled. The windows are mullioned with Gothic glazing and moulded hood moulds, and there is a canted bay window to the left. In the centre is a gabled porch with a segmental arch.	II
Unidentified chest tomb 52.64719°N 2.74823°W	—	c. 1830	The chest tomb is in the churchyard of the Church of St Mary and St Andrew. It is rectangular, in sandstone, and has a moulded plinth, a serrated top ledger, and square corner pilasters. On the top is an oval-shaped finial with a serrated band on a square plinth. There are two inscribed panels, which are illegible.	II
Unidentified chest tomb 52.64749°N 2.74816°W	—	c. 1830	The chest tomb is in the churchyard of the Church of St Mary and St Andrew. It is rectangular, in sandstone, and has a moulded plinth and capping, a chamfered top ledger, and reeded pilasters. There are four inscribed panels, which are illegible.	II
Unidentified chest tomb 52.64730°N 2.74858°W	—	c. 1830	The chest tomb is in the churchyard of the Church of St Mary and St Andrew. It is rectangular, in sandstone, and has a moulded plinth and capping, a chamfered top ledger, and reeded corner pilasters. There are two inscribed panels, which are illegible.	II
Unidentified pedestal tomb 52.64719°N 2.74833°W	—	c. 1830	The pedestal tomb is in the churchyard of the Church of St Mary and St Andrew. It has a rectangular plan, a moulded plinth and capping, and a decorated egg-shaped urn on a moulded plinth. The inscription is illegible.	II
Hiles memorial 52.64712°N 2.74797°W	—	c. 1833	The memorial is in the churchyard of the Church of St Mary and St Andrew, and is to the memory of James Hiles and another person. It is a rectangular chest tomb in sandstone, and has a moulded plinth and capping, a slightly chamfered top ledger, and fluted corner pilasters. There are two inscribed panels, one of which is illegible.	II
Church Bridge; 52.62563°N 2.76682°W		Early to mid 19th century	The bridge carries a Station Road over Cound Brook. It is in sandstone, and consists of a single segmental arch with circular culverts on each side. The bridge has a string course and round corner piers.	II
Oakley memorial 52.64724°N 2.74812°W	—	c. 1837	The memorial is in the churchyard of the Church of St Mary and St Andrew, and is to the memory of two members of the Oakley family. It is a rectangular chest tomb in sandstone with steeply sloping sides. The tomb has a moulded plinth and capping, a steep chamfered top ledger, and grooved corner pilasters. There are two moulded inscribed panels.	II
St Edward's Church, Dorrington; 52.62160°N 2.77475°W		1845	The church, designed by Edward Haycock is in limestone with a machine tile roof. It consists of a nave, north and south transepts, a chancel with north and south vestries, and a west tower. The tower has four stages, a datestone, an openwork parapet, a corbel table, corner crocketed pinnacles and a short octagonal spire. All the windows are broad lancets with hood moulds.	II
Gate piers, gates and railings, St Edward's Church; 52.62178°N 2.77487°W	—	c. 1845	The gate piers flank the entrances to the churchyard and to the adjacent vicarage. They are in limestone and have a square section. Each pier has a moulded plinth and a pyramidal cap. The railings and gates are in wrought iron.	II
Old Vicarage, Dorrington; 52.62150°N 2.77528°W	—	1846	The vicarage, later a private house, is in red brick with a double-span slate roof. The main block has two storeys and three bays, the central bay projecting and gabled with decorative bargeboards. The central doorway has a Tudor arch, a Gothic fanlight, and a moulded hood mould. The windows on the front are mullioned and transomed, and at the rear are two canted bay windows. To the right is a lower service block with casement windows.	II
Gateway and adjoining walls, Condover Hall; 52.64678°N 2.74588°W		19th century	The gateway is in pink sandstone, and has a round-headed entrance with a keystone, above which is an achievement and a smallpediment flanked by decorated obelisks. Flanking the entrance are walls ending in piers surmounted by carved lions and double-headed eagles. The gates are in wrought iron and have fleur-de-lis finials. The walls are in sandstone with stone coping.	II*
2 and 3 Church Street; 52.64785°N 2.74900°W	—	Mid 19th century	A pair of brick houses with a dentilled eaves cornice and a tile roof. There are two storeys and three bays. In the upper floor are three casement windows, and the lower floor contains two former shop windows, and two doorways, one with console brackets and a dentilled band.	II
The Old Post Office, gate piers and railings 52.62076°N 2.77222°W		Mid 19th century	A house in red brick with a tile roof. There are two storeys, three bays, and a full-height lean-to on the left. The main part has a central doorway with a gabled trellised porch and sash windows with segmental heads. In the lean-to is a doorway and a casement window, both with segmental heads. In front of the house are cast iron railings and gate piers with domed caps.	II
The Old Vicarage, Condover; 52.64835°N 2.75062°W	—	Mid 19th century	The vicarage, later a private house, is in sandstone, and has a double-span tile roof with coped verges. There are two storeys, a front of two bays, a single-storey lean to the right containing an entrance, and a two-storey lean-to the left. The windows are sashes with architraves.	II
Netley Hall and service buildings 52.61132°N 2.77945°W	—	1854–5	A country house designed by Edward Haycock in Classical style. It is in red brick with stone dressings, rusticated quoins, sill bands, a modillion eaves cornice, a balustrade at the top, slate roofs, three storeys, and sash windows. The south front has five bays, the central bay is stone-faced, and there is a porch with two pairs of unfluted Doric columns, a moulded entablature, and double doors with a rectangular fanlight. The west front has three bays and a central full-height canted bay window, the north front has a Tuscan colonnade, and recessed to the northeast is a four-bay service block with a clock tower.	II
Terraced garden structures, Condover Hall; 52.64637°N 2.74821°W	—	c. 1870	The upper terrace has a balustrade about 150 metres (490 ft) long in sandstone, with square balusters and rectangular piers surmounted by terracotta urns with grotesque heads and floral motifs. There are two flights of steps, and at the south end is a bastion serving as a garden house; this has buttresses, and a tunnel with four-bay arcades. A wall runs along the lower terrace to the west of the hall. It is in sandstone with coping, and is about 150 metres (490 ft) long. At each end is a square corner bastion, and at the north west corner the wall curves to end in a pier surmounted by a grotesque statue. The exhedra is in sandstone, and consists of a semicircular garden seat ending in square piers with scrolled brackets. It is approached by a wide flight of three steps.	II
Sculpture of Richard Tarlton, Condover Hall; 52.64666°N 2.74915°W	—	Late 19th century	The statue is in the grounds of the hall, attributed to sculptor Reginald Cholmondeley. It consists of a seated figure with its arms folded, on a sandstone pillar.	II
Parish pump and well house 52.63426°N 2.78090°W	—	1897	This was erected to celebrate the Golden Jubilee of Queen Victoria, and consists of an open gabled porch in red brick and timber with a machine tile roof. It contains a cast iron pump and a sandstone basin.	II
Stapleton War Memorial; 52.63573°N 2.78332°W	—	1920	The war memorial stands to the east of the chancel of the Church of St John the Baptist. It is in limestone, and has a stepped plinth, a tapered base with a moulded cap, and a rectangular tapered shaft carrying a wheel-head Celtic cross. On the cross-head are knot patterns in relief. The base carries inscriptions and the names of those lost in the First World War.	II
Bridge House; 52.64471°N 2.74488°W	—	1958	The house was designed by Mervyn Seal for his own use. It is in plum-coloured and brindle brick, with the upper floor mainly timber framed and slate-hung, and it has a felted roof. In the ground floor is a doorway with a void for a car port to the right, and a garage to the right of that.	II

== Notes and references ==
=== Sources ===
- Historic England, "Church of St St Mary and St Andrew, Condover (1366672)", National Heritage List for England
- Historic England, "Church of St John the Baptist, Condover (1176071)", National Heritage List for England
- Historic England, "Nos. 1 and 2 Grange Cottages, Condover (1055676)", National Heritage List for England
- Historic England, "Nos. 4 and 5 Church Street, Condover (1055696)", National Heritage List for England
- Historic England, "Village Food Store and Bakery, Condover (1175347)", National Heritage List for England
- Historic England, "Condover Court, Condover (1175720)", National Heritage List for England
- Historic England, "Moat Farmhouse, Condover (1175206)", National Heritage List for England
- Historic England, "Stone revetment wall surrounding Moat Farm, Condover (1295378)", National Heritage List for England
- Historic England, "Wheat Hall, Condover (1366664)", National Heritage List for England
- Historic England, "Church House, Condover (1175370)", National Heritage List for England
- Historic England, "The School House, Condover (1308029)", National Heritage List for England
- Historic England, "Yew Tree Cottage, Condover (1055703)", National Heritage List for England
- Historic England, "Farmhouse at Home Farm, Condover (1390747)", National Heritage List for England
- Historic England, "Condover Hall, Condover (1055706)", National Heritage List for England
- Historic England, "Main gateway and gates to Condover Hall, Condover (1055707)", National Heritage List for England
- Historic England, "The Cruciform House, Condover (1308141)", National Heritage List for England
- Historic England, "Netley Old Hall, Condover (1055087)", National Heritage List for England
- Historic England, "Scalloped basin approximately 3 metres north of tower of Church of St Mary and St Andrew, Condover (1055698)", National Heritage List for England
- Historic England, "Chatford Farmhouse, Condover (1055693)", National Heritage List for England
- Historic England, "Terraced garden structures at Condover Hall, Condover (1175852)", National Heritage List for England
- Historic England, "Barn approximately lO metres south of Hill Top Farmhouse, Condover (1366660)", National Heritage List for England
- Historic England, "The Forge, Condover (1366639)", National Heritage List for England
- Historic England, "Yew Tree Farmhouse, Condover (1055675)", National Heritage List for England
- Historic England, "Nos. 3 and 4 The Square, Condover (1055673)", National Heritage List for England
- Historic England, "Hill Top Farmhouse, Condover (1055674)", National Heritage List for England
- Historic England, "Lower Fold, Condover (1366659)", National Heritage List for England
- Historic England, "Lower Netley Farmhouse, Condover (1175198)", National Heritage List for England
- Historic England, "Middle Shadymoor Farmhouse, Condover (1055085)", National Heritage List for England
- Historic England, "L-shaped outbuilding approximately 20 metres north of Moat Farmhouse, Condover (1055086)", National Heritage List for England
- Historic England, "Olde Farmhouse, Condover (1176092)", National Heritage List for England
- Historic England, "Barn approximately 20 metres south of Olde Farmhouse, Condover (1176100)", National Heritage List for England
- Historic England, "L-shaped range of farm buildings approximately 15 metres northeast of Olde Farmhouse, Condover (1366663)", National Heritage List for England
- Historic England, "Rose Cottage, Condover (1175674)", National Heritage List for England
- Historic England, "Ryton Grange, Condover (1176045)", National Heritage List for England
- Historic England, "The Bungalow, Condover (1055697)", National Heritage List for England
- Historic England, "Barn approximately 10 metres north-west of Upper Moat Farmhouse, Condover (1055084)", National Heritage List for England
- Historic England, "Country Friends Restaurant, Condover (1055671)", National Heritage List for England
- Historic England, "Two barns approximately 50 metres north-west of Manor Farmhouse, Condover (1055678)", National Heritage List for England
- Historic England, "Stables approximately 20 metres south-west of The Old Vicarage, Condover (1055705)", National Heritage List for England
- Historic England, "Wheathall Cottage, Condover (1055681)", National Heritage List for England
- Historic England, "Barn approximately 10 metres north-east of Chatford Farmhouse, Condover (1366669)", National Heritage List for England
- Historic England, "Stables attached by short brick wall to Wheat Hall, Condover (1176135)", National Heritage List for England
- Historic England, "Westley Farmhouse and attached cast-iron pump, Condover (1175283)", National Heritage List for England
- Historic England, "Grove Farmhouse, Condover (1366657)", National Heritage List for England
- Historic England, "Wood memorial approximately 7.5 metres south of nave of Church of St Mary and St Andrew, Condover (1308256)", National Heritage List for England
- Historic England, "Bank House, Condover (1366658)", National Heritage List for England
- Historic England, "Manor Farmhouse, Condover (1366662)", National Heritage List for England
- Historic England, "Sundial approximately 10 metres north-west of tower of Church of St Mary and St Andrew, Condover (1175502)", National Heritage List for England
- Historic England, "The Old Rectory and Rectory Cottage, Condover (1055677)", National Heritage List for England
- Historic England, "Chatford House, Condover (1055694)", National Heritage List for England
- Historic England, "The Stone House, Condover (1366671)", National Heritage List for England
- Historic England, "No. 1 Church Street, Condover (1366670)", National Heritage List for England
- Historic England, "Boreton Farmhouse and attached stable blocks, Condover (1175180)", National Heritage List for England
- Historic England, "Ivy House, Condover (1055672)", National Heritage List for England
- Historic England, "Dorrington House, Condover (1055670)", National Heritage List for England
- Historic England, "Ryton Grove, Condover (1176060)", National Heritage List for England
- Historic England, "Willinson memorial approximately 4 metres east of chancel of Church of St Mary and St Andrew, Condover (1366635)", National Heritage List for England
- Historic England, "Grove Farmhouse, Condover (1176063)", National Heritage List for England
- Historic England, "Ice house approximately 5 metres north-east of Longridge, Condover (1055692)", National Heritage List for England
- Historic England, "Goff memorial approximately 6 metres south of nave of Church of St Mary and St Andrew, Condover (1366634)", National Heritage List for England
- Historic England, "Unidentified chest tomb approximately 7 metres east of chancel of Church of St Mary and St Andrew, Condover (1055701)", National Heritage List for England
- Historic England, "Jones memorial approximately 6 metres east of chancel of Church of St Mary and St Andrew, Condover (1055699)", National Heritage List for England
- Historic England, "Jones memorial approximately 4 metres south of south transept of Church of St Mary and St Andrew, Condover (1055700)", National Heritage List for England
- Historic England, "Condover Bridge, Condover (1366661)", National Heritage List for England
- Historic England, "Former Smithy, Condover (1055680)", National Heritage List for England
- Historic England, "The Three Horseshoes Inn, Condover (1175949)", National Heritage List for England
- Historic England, "Milestone set in front garden wall of The Old Vicarage, Condover (1308186)", National Heritage List for England
- Historic England, "Farmbuildings approximately 100 metres north-west of Moat Farmhouse, Condover (1366964)", National Heritage List for England
- Historic England, "Barn approximately 40 metres south-west of Olde Farmhouse, Condover (1055679)", National Heritage List for England
- Historic England, "Post Office, Condover (1055704)", National Heritage List for England
- Historic England, "Wayford Bridge, Condover (1366965)", National Heritage List for England
- Historic England, "Netley Lodge, Condover (1055691)", National Heritage List for England
- Historic England, "Gate piers, gates, railings and flanking walls immediately to south-west of Netley Lodge, Condover (1366668)", National Heritage List for England
- Historic England, "Dorrington Grove, Condover (1366667)", National Heritage List for England
- Historic England, "Unidentified chest tomb approximately 23 metres south of tower of Church of St Mary and St Andrew, Condover (1308222)", National Heritage List for England
- Historic England, "Unidentified chest tomb approximately 3 metres northeast of chancel of Church of St Mary and St Andrew, Condover (1308258)", National Heritage List for England
- Historic England, "Unidentified chest tomb approximately 6 metres south of nave of Church of St Mary and St Andrew, Condover (1366636)", National Heritage List for England
- Historic England, "Unidentified pedestal tomb approximately 15 metres south of south transept of Church of St Mary and St Andrew, Condover (1055702)", National Heritage List for England
- Historic England, "Hiles memorial approximately 30 metres south of south transept of Church of St Mary and St Andrew, Condover (1175555)", National Heritage List for England
- Historic England, "Church Bridge, Condover (1366963)", National Heritage List for England
- Historic England, "Oakley memorial approximately 7.5 metres southeast of chancel of Church of St Mary and St Andrew, Condover (1308241)", National Heritage List for England
- Historic England, "Church of St Edward, Condover (1366638)", National Heritage List for England
- Historic England, "Gate piers, gates and railings to west side of churchyard of Church of St Edward and flanking the drive to Old Vicarage, Condover (1055710)", National Heritage List for England
- Historic England, "Old Vicarage, Condover (1175933)", National Heritage List for England
- Historic England, "Nos. 2 and 3 Church Street, Condover (1055695)", National Heritage List for England
- Historic England, "Sculpture of Richard Tarlton and attached walls, Condover (1308124)", National Heritage List for England
- Historic England, "The Old Post Office, attached gate piers and railings, Condover (1055669)", National Heritage List for England
- Historic England, "The Old Vicarage, Condover (1175751)", National Heritage List for England
- Historic England, "Netley Hall and attached service buildings, Condover (1175269)", National Heritage List for England
- Historic England, "Former parish pump and well house approximately 30 metres south-east of Olde Farmhouse, Condover (1308026)", National Heritage List for England
- Historic England, "Stapleton War Memorial, Condover (1428494)", National Heritage List for England
- Historic England, "Bridge House, Condover (1437448)", National Heritage List for England
- Historic England, Listed Buildings
- Newman, John; Pevsner, Nikolaus (2006), Shropshire, The Buildings of England, New Haven and London: Yale University Press, ISBN 0-300-12083-4
