= Katherine Plymley =

British diarist, naturalist, and painter

- Born: Shropshire, England
- Died: 2 September 1829 (aged 71); Bank House, Longnor, Shropshire, England
- Resting place: Leebotwood church, Shropshire
- Known for: diary, paintings, travel journals
- Parent(s): Joseph and Diana (née Flint) Plymley
- Relatives: Joseph Plymley (later Corbett) and Ann Plymley

Katherine Plymley (baptised 31 January 1758 – 2 September 1829) was a diarist, traveller, painter and naturalist who recorded life in Shropshire, England, between 1791 and 1827.

== Personal life ==
Plymley was baptized at Longnor, Shropshire, on 31 January 1758. She was the eldest child of Joseph Plymley (1716–1802) of the Bank House, Longnor, and Diana, née Flint (1725–1779), a member of the Shropshire gentry family of Corbett. Her siblings were Joseph (1759–1838), archdeacon of Ludlow from 1792 to 1830 and Ann (1760–1829). The sisters were educated at home and were involved in their father’s apothecary business. Neither married but they helped care for their brother's 13 children from his two wives. They were particularly involved in the education of these children. Plymley died on 2 September 1829 and is buried in Leebotwood.

== Paintings, diaries and travel journals ==
A large number of water colour paintings, diaries and study notebooks authored by Plymley have survived and are now held by Shropshire Archives, Shrewsbury, UK.

Plymley studied natural sciences, specialising in entomology. She produced over 400 watercolour paintings, many of which show the life-cycles of butterflies and moths from egg to adult, and which were often drawn from life as she maintained the insects and their food plants through their life-cycle. She kept up with scientific developments and, through her scholarship, was in communication with academics including Frederick William Hope.

Her writings survive in 210 notebooks, many of which are not dated. They comprise 9 memoirs of her father (written after 1802) and a niece (written after 1807), 29 travel journals, 138 diaries (covering 1791–1827) and 34 undated study notebooks. These give accounts of her opinions as well as factual information. The Industrial Revolution began in the West Midlands area where she lived, and her family were part of Shropshire society that included families such as the Darwins and Wedgewoods and that also hosted visitors who were political and religious activists. She therefore met people of both local and national significance, and recorded diaries, observations and opinions covering the period between 1781 and 1827. Several of these people either visited or stayed with the Plymley family, giving an opportunity for candid and informal accounts, including of radicalism among the cultured elite. One example was Thomas Clarkson, who campaigned against slavery; several of her earlier diaries are full of accounts of campaigns and progress towards the abolition of the slave trade. Other people she described for their character and conversation included Josiah Wedgewood, radical clergyman Reverend Archibald Alison, architect Charles Bage, botanist Theophilus Houlbrooke and playwright and philanthropist Hannah More. Her accounts also give insight into the attitudes and preoccupations of society.

Her travel journals include accounts of repeated visits to London and Bath, a tour of North Wales, and travels to Oxford, Cambridge and Penzance. As a result, she describes seeing some of William Herschel's telescopes in 1796, the first trials of Richard Trevithick's steam engine in Penzance in 1803 and meeting the Ladies of Llangollen in 1792. She was acquainted with travel writers such as Thomas Pennant and William Gilpin, and visited the home of the former for several days in 1792 on her way to Anglesey.

The study notebooks provide an account of her lifelong programme of self-improvement from 1781 onwards. She concentrated on topics such as religion, education, moral philosophy and biography, and in her notebooks recorded both extracts from books she had read and her commentary on them. She wrote about the position of unmarried women, and strongly held that girls should be educated.

== Legacy ==
There was an exhibition of her paintings in 1997 in Shrewsbury Museum and several are now on permanent display there.
