= Listed buildings in Longnor, Shropshire =

Longnor is a civil parish in Shropshire, England. It contains 16 listed buildings that are recorded in the National Heritage List for England. Of these, two are listed at Grade I, the highest of the three grades, two are at Grade II*, the middle grade, and the others are at Grade II, the lowest grade. The parish contains the village of Longnor and the surrounding countryside. Most of the listed buildings are houses, cottages and farmhouses, many of which are timber framed and date from the 14th to the 17th century. The other listed buildings are a church and a country house, both with associated listed structures, and a former mill.

== Key ==
Grade	Criteria
I	Buildings of exceptional interest, sometimes considered to be internationally important
II*	Particularly important buildings of more than special interest
II	Buildings of national importance and special interest

== Buildings ==
Name and location	Photograph	Date	Notes	Grade
St Mary's Church; 52.59979°N 2.75725°W		c. 1280	The church was altered and extended in the 18th century and in about 1840. It is in sandstone with a tile roof, and consists of a nave and a chancel in one cell on a chamfered plinth. On the west gable is a wooden bellcote with a pyramidal copper cap and a weathervane. In the north and south walls are lancet windows linked by hood moulds. On the south side a flight of ten steps leads up to an entrance to the west gallery, and on this wall is a sundial. The east window consists of three stepped lights.	I
Moat House; 52.59762°N 2.74911°W		Late 14th century	The house, which stands in a trapezoidal moat, was altered in about 1600 and in the 17th century, and a bay was added in 1988. It is timber framed with plastered infill, partly rebuilt in sandstone and brick, which has been painted to resemble timber framing, and has a tile roof. There are two storeys and an attic, and a front of four bays. On the front is a gabled timber framed porch, and the windows are casements, one with a segmental head.	II*
Quality Row; 52.60121°N 2.75678°W	—	Late 15th or early 16th century (probable)	The house was altered and extended in the 19th century, and has been converted into three cottages. The original part is timber framed with cruck construction, and is rendered, the extension is in stone and brick, and the roof is slated. There are two storeys, four bays, and a single-storey, single-bay extension to the right. On the front is a lean-to porch, the windows are casements, and internally there are at least three full cruck trusses.	II
The Farmhouse; 52.60026°N 2.75065°W	—	Late 16th century	The farmhouse was altered in the 17th and 19th centuries. The early part is timber framed and rendered, the extensions are in brick and sandstone, and the roof is tiled and has three spans. There are two storeys and an attic, and the farmhouse consists of three parallel gabled ranges, with a front of two bays. On the front is a gabled porch and the windows are casements, those in the ground floor with segmental heads.	II
Cobblers Cottage; 52.59790°N 2.75406°W		Mid 17th century	The house was extended probably in the 18th century. The original part is timber framed with brick nogging on a sandstone plinth, the extension is in sandstone and brick, and the roof is tiled. The house has one storey and an attic, and a T-shaped plan, consisting of a two-bay range, a two-bay gabled cross-wing on the left, and an extension to the right. There is a lean-to porch, the windows are casements, and there are two gabled eaves dormers.	II
17 and 18 Longnor; 52.59825°N 2.75043°W	—	Mid to late 17th century	Originally one cottage, it was later extended to both sides and the rear and divided into two dwellings. The original part is timber framed with brick nogging, partly rendered, the extension are in brick, and the roof is tiled. It has one storey and an attic and two bays, the windows are casements, and there is a raking eaves dormer.	II
Barset Cottage and Framley Cottage; 52.60150°N 2.75591°W	—	Mid to late 17th century	A pair of timber framed cottages with plastered and brick infill, extensions in brick, and a tile roof. There is one storey and attics, four bays, and extensions to the right and at the rear. The windows are casements, and there are three gabled half-dormers and one full gabled dormer.	II
The Malt House; 52.60173°N 2.75236°W	—	Mid to late 17th century	The house is timber framed with brick infill, partly rebuilt in sandstone and brick, pebbledashed at the rear, and with a tile roof. There are two storeys, and on the front is a single bay, with a cross-wing of two bays to the left, and at the rear is a twin-gabled wing with one storey and an attic. The windows are casements.	II
Longnor Hall; 52.59991°N 2.76040°W		1670	A country house that was altered in 1838–42 by Edward Haycock. The house is in red brick with dressings in Grinshill sandstone and a hipped tile roof. There are two storeys, an attic and a basement, a double-pile plan, a front of seven bays, and sides of five bays. The entrance front has a chamfered plinth, chamfered quoins, a moulded band, and a moulded eaves cornice. Steps lead up to the central doorway that has an architrave with three-quarter Ionic columns, an entablature with a pulvinated frieze, and a segmental pediment containing a coat of arms in the tympanum. Above the three central bays is a shaped gable containing an oval plaque, surmounted by a pineapple finial, and flanked by octagonal turrets. Outside these are eaves dormers with shaped gables. The windows are sashes, each with a moulded architrave, a pulvinated frieze, a cornice, and some with a triangular pediment.	I
Grove Farmhouse; 52.60204°N 2.75574°W	—	Late 17th century	The farmhouse was later extended and altered. The original part is timber framed with brick nogging on a sandstone plinth, rendered on the front and on the left gable end, the extension is in brick, and the roof is tiled. There are two storeys, a wrought iron porch, small-paned casement windows, and a full-height canted bay window in the left return.	II
Mill House and mill 52.59979°N 2.75722°W		Late 17th century	The mill, now disused, is timber framed with brick nogging and some weatherboarding. It is partly rebuilt in red brick, and has a tile roof. There are two storeys and an attic, a gabled hoist lift, and casement windows. The house, which dates from the 19th century, projects to the right, forming an L-shaped plan. It is in brick with a tile roof, and has two storeys.	II
Micklewood Farmhouse; 52.60607°N 2.76995°W	—	c. 1680	The farmhouse was altered and extended in the 18th and 19th centuries, and has been divided into two dwellings. It is in red brick with grey sandstone dressings, quoins, two dentil string courses, a dentil eaves cornice, and a hipped tile roof. There are two storeys, an attic, and a basement to the right. The house has a U-shaped plan, with a central block of two bays, and flanking gabled wings. In the centre is a doorway with foliage-carved impost blocks and a keystone, and a segmental pediment with moulded dentils. Most of the windows are sashes, there is a mullioned basement window, and four gabled eaves dormers.	II*
Gate and gate piers north-east of Longnor Hall; 52.60116°N 2.75862°W		Early 18th century	The gate and gate piers are at the north-eastern entrance to the hall. There is a pair of sandstone gate piers, each with a plinth, chamfered rustication and a moulded cap. The gate dates from the late 19th century, and is wooden.	II
Gates and gate piers north-west of Longnor Hall; 52.60107°N 2.76241°W	—	Early 18th century	The gates and gate piers are at the north-western entrance to the hall. There are two pairs of sandstone gate piers, each with a plinth, chamfered rustication and a moulded cap. Between the outer piers are wooden pedestrian gates, and between the central piers are wooden carriage gates, all dating from the late 19th century.	II
Churchyard gates and gate piers, St Mary's Church; 52.59984°N 2.75695°W		Early 18th century	The gate piers are in grey sandstone, and each has a square section, a plinth, chamfered rustication, a moulded cornice, and a flat top. The gates date from about 1934, they are in cast iron, and each gate has an inscribed plate.	II
The Dower House; 52.60134°N 2.75718°W	—	c. 1756	The house was altered and extended in the 19th century and in about 1915. It is in red brick on a chamfered plinth, with a dentil eaves cornice and a hipped tile roof with parapeted gable ends. There are two storeys and an attic, and front of five bays. In the centre are double doors with a reeded architrave, corner paterae, and a flat hood with a cornice. The windows are sashes with stone lintels and triple keystones.	II
