= Listed buildings in Leebotwood =

Leebotwood is a civil parish in Shropshire, England. It contains twelve listed buildings that are recorded in the National Heritage List for England. Of these, two are at Grade II*, the middle of the three grades, and the others are at Grade II, the lowest grade. The parish contains the village of Leebotwood and the surrounding countryside. Most of the listed buildings are houses, cottages, farmhouses and farm buildings, many of which are timber framed. The other listed buildings are a church, a public house, and a war memorial.

== Key ==
Grade	Criteria
II*	Particularly important buildings of more than special interest
II	Buildings of national importance and special interest

== Buildings ==
Name and location	Photograph	Date	Notes	Grade
St Mary's Church; 52.58326°N 2.78274°W		13th century	The church was altered and the tower was added in 1829. The church is built in sandstone with a slate roof, and consists of a nave and chancel in one unit, and a west tower. The tower has a rectangular plan, two stages, a west doorway with a pointed arch, a west window of three lancets of equal height, and a plain parapet with a string course and coping. The windows elsewhere are also lancets, including a triple-stepped lancet at the east end.	II*
Rose Cottage; 52.58425°N 2.77532°W	—	15th or 16th century	The house was altered in about 1600 and enlarged in the 19th century. It is timber framed with cruck construction and brick infill, the left gable end is rendered, the rebuilding and extension is in brick and the roof is tiled. There is one storey and an attic, and three bays. The windows are casements, and there is one gabled eaves dormer. Inside are two full cruck trusses.	II
The Pound Inn and barn 52.58407°N 2.77487°W		15th or early 16th century (probable)	A farmhouse and barn, later a public house, it has been altered and extended. The building is in rendered timber framing with cruck construction, the extensions are in stone, the barn has weatherboarding, and the roof is thatched. There is one storey and attics, with a two-bay hall range, a projecting gabled cross-wing to the right, and an extension and a barn to the left. On the front is a gabled porch, most of the windows are casements, there are canted bay windows, and two large gabled dormers. Adjoining the cross-wing is a mounting block, and inside the hall range are three full cruck trusses.	II
Penkridge Hall; 52.57405°N 2.75411°W		1590	A farmhouse, later a private house, it was extended in the 17th century and altered in the 18th and 19th centuries. The house is timber framed with plastered infill on a high sandstone plinth, partly rendered with partial rebuilding ins brick and sandstone, and it has a tile roof. There are two storeys, an attic and a basement, and two bays. The upper floor is jettied on three sides with a moulded bressumer, and the southeast gable is jettied with a carved bressumer. Most windows are casements, some are mullioned and transomed, and there is a small gabled eaves dormer.	II*
Cottage southwest of Brook House; 52.58814°N 2.77419°W	—	Early 17th century	The cottage is timber framed on a stone plinth, the left end wall is in sandstone, the front was rebuilt in brick in the 19th century in Tudor Gothic style, and the roof is tiled. There is one storey and an attic, two bays, and a brick lean-to on the left with a corrugated iron roof. In the centre is a doorway with a hood mould, the windows are casements, and there are two gabled half-dormers.	II
Penkridge Hall Cottage; 52.57424°N 2.75412°W	—	Early to mid 17th century	The cottage was altered and extended n the 18th and 19th centuries. It is timber framed with plaster infill, the rebuilding is in grey sandstone and red brick, and the roof is tiled. There is one storey and an attic, two bays, and a single-storey sandstone extension on the left. The windows are casements.	II
29 Walkmills; 52.58988°N 2.79068°W	—	Mid 17th century	A cottage that was later extended to become part of a larger house. The listed part is timber framed with brick infill, the front wall has been rebuilt in brown brick, and the roof is tiled. There is one storey and an attic, two bays, and a rear outshut. The windows are casements, there are two eaves dormers, and two doorways, one with a segmental head. Inside is a timber framed cross-wall.	II
The Day House; 52.57990°N 2.76309°W	—	Mid to late 17th century	A farmhouse that was altered and extended in the 19th and 20th centuries, and divided into three dwellings. It is timber framed with red brick infill, partly rebuilt in brick, and extended in sandstone. There is one storey and attics, four bays, and an extension. The doorway has a segmental head, the windows are casements, and there are four gabled dormers.	II
Top Farmhouse; 52.58074°N 2.77450°W	—	Late 17th century	The farmhouse was altered and extended in the 19th century, and has been divided into two dwellings. It is timber framed with plastered infill, partly rendered, partly rebuilt in brick and stone, and has a tile roof. There is one storey with an attic and a semi-basement, and an L-shaped plan, with a main range, a cross-wing at the right projecting to the rear, and a rear wing. The windows are casements.	II
Barn west of Top Farmhouse; 52.58065°N 2.77479°W	—	c. 1700	The barn is timber framed with weatherboarding on a sandstone plinth, one end is partly rebuilt in brick, and it has a corrugated iron roof. There are five bays, and it contains doors and loft doors.	II
The Farmhouse; 52.58258°N 2.77422°W	—	Early 18th century	The farmhouse was extended in the 19th century and in the early 20th century, and has been divided into two dwellings. It is in red brick with tile roofs, and has a T-shaped plan. The 18th-century part is a cross-wing with a plinth, two storeys and an attic, the 19th-century range is at right angles with a 20th-century extension, both with two storeys, and there is a lean-to at the rear. Most of the windows are casements.	II
War memorial 52.58336°N 2.78211°W	—	1923	The war memorial is in the churchyard of St Mary's Church. It is in limestone, and consists of a Celtic cross with a tapered shaft on a pedestal on a stepped square plinth. There is knot decoration on the face of the cross and the shaft. On the pedestal are inscriptions and the names of those lost in both World Wars.	II
