= Bert Harry =

English footballer (1897–1966)

Personal information
- Full name: Albert Ernest Harry
- Date of birth: 8 March 1897
- Place of birth: Kingston upon Thames, England
- Date of death: 3 January 1966 (aged 68)
- Place of death: Bayston Hill, England
- Height: 5 ft 6 in (1.68 m)
- Position: Outside right

Senior career*
Years	Team	Apps	(Gls)
1919-1921	Kingstonian		
1921–1934	Crystal Palace	410	(53)
1934– ?	Dartford		
-1935	Shrewsbury Town		
- * Club domestic league appearances and goals

Albert Ernest Harry (8 March 1897 – 3 January 1966) was an English footballer who played in The Football League for Crystal Palace. He also played for Kingstonian, Dartford and Shrewsbury Town.

== Early life ==
Harry served in the army during World War I with the 6th battalion of the East Surrey Regiment from 1914 to 1919.

== Football career ==
Harry was signed for Crystal Palace in 1921 by then manager Edmund Goodman, who had spotted Harry playing for Kingstonian in the Surrey Cup Final. He made his Football League debut in March 1922 and went on to make 410 appearances for Crystal Palace between then and 1934, a club record which stood until surpassed by Terry Long in 1960. Harry moved to Dartford in August 1934 and later to Shrewsbury Town.

== Later life and death ==
Harry subsequently retired from football and became a publican in Oakamoor, Staffordshire, then returned to Shropshire where he kept the Pound Inn at Leebotwood from 1935 to 1954 and Horseshoes Inn at nearby Dorrington from 1954 until he retired from the licensed trade in 1963, when he moved to Bayston Hill near Shrewsbury.

Albert Harry died in 1966 aged 68, and was buried on 7 January 1966 at Leebotwood church. He left a widow and two daughters.
