= Great Ryton =

Village in Shropshire, England

Coordinates: 52.626°N 2.756°W

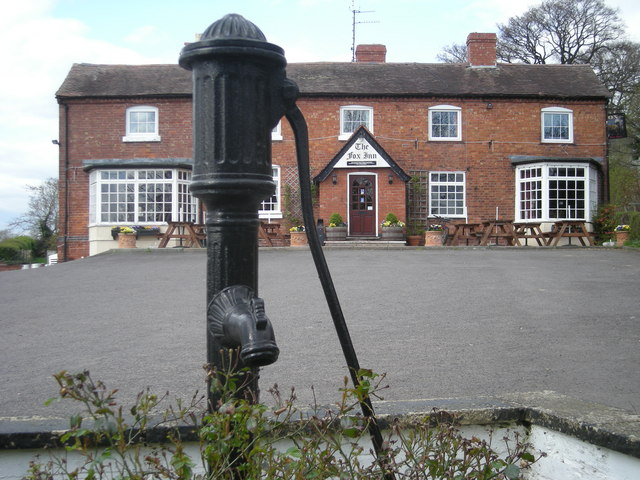
- The Fox Inn public house, Little Ryton

- Location within Shropshire
- OS grid reference: SJ488034
- Civil parish: Condover
- Unitary authority: Shropshire
- Ceremonial county: Shropshire
- Region: West Midlands
- Country: England
- Sovereign state: United Kingdom
- Post town: SHREWSBURY
- Postcode district: SY5
- Dialling code: 01743
- Police: West Mercia
- Fire: Shropshire
- Ambulance: West Midlands
- UK Parliament: Shrewsbury and Atcham

Great Ryton is a small village in Shropshire, England, to the south of Shrewsbury.

It is located less than 1 mile (1.6 kilometres) to the northeast of the village of Dorrington and the A49 road there.

Together with the neighbouring hamlet of Little Ryton and Ryton Grove, the combined community is often referred to as simply "Ryton". (Not to be confused however with the village and parish of Ryton, which also is in Shropshire but in the former Bridgnorth District.) Ryton lies at around 106m above sea level. The population was estimated as being 142 in 2008.

== Parish ==
Ryton lies within the civil parish of Condover, a village to the north. The parish is subdivided into a number of wards, one of which is Ryton, which sends one councillor to the parish council.

== Amenities and features ==
In Little Ryton is the Ryton Village Hall, as well as a public house called "The Fox".

In Great Ryton is a small red-brick "Ryton Mission Church", the size of a chapel, which forms part of the Condover ecclesiastical parish and is dedicated to Saint Thomas.

== Transport ==
Minsterley Motors route 435 (Shrewsbury-Ludlow and vice versa) runs through the area and calls at Great Ryton. The service runs Mondays-Saturdays.

Regional Cycle Route 32/33 passes through Great Ryton and Little Ryton, on its way from Condover to Longnor.

== Notable residents ==
Josiah Oldfield, the lawyer, physician and advocate of fruitarian diet, grew up at Great Ryton, where his father was a provision dealer. Freddie Fox (jockey), was born at Great Ryton in 1888. Two unrelated Admirals who each became Commander-in-Chief, Plymouth, had their homes in Great Ryton after retirement. Sir Cecil Thursby, a distinguished commander in World War I, lived at The Styche until his death in 1936, while World War II veteran Sir Richard Onslow lived at Ryton Grove until his death in 1975. General Sir Peter de la Billiere (born 1934), who ultimately commanded the British contingent in the First Gulf War, lived at Ryton at time he enlisted in the British Army.

== See also ==
- Listed buildings in Condover
