= Listed buildings in Bayston Hill =

Bayston Hill is a civil parish in Shropshire, England. The parish contains five listed buildings that are recorded in the National Heritage List for England. All the listed buildings are designated at Grade II, the lowest of the three grades, which is applied to "buildings of national importance and special interest". The parish contains the large village of Bayston Hill, the smaller village of Pulley, and the surrounding countryside. The listed buildings are consist of three farmhouses, and a farm building, all of which are timber framed, and a redundant church converted into a dwelling.

== Buildings ==
Name and location	Photograph	Date	Notes
Bayston Farmhouse; 52.66784°N 2.75345°W	—	15th century (probable)	The farmhouse was considerably extended in the 17th century, and again in the 19th century. It is timber framed with brick infill and partly encased in brick, and it has a tile roof. The original hall range has two projecting gables, there is a range at the rear at right angles, and a further 19th-century extension. It has one storey with attics and cellars, and a dentil eaves cornice at the front. One of the windows is a sash window, and there are gabled dormers, but most of the windows are 19th-century casements.
Pulley Hall; 52.67954°N 2.76271°W	—	Mid to late 16th century	A farmhouse, later a private house, it is timber framed with brick infill, partly roughcast, with extensions in brick and a tile roof. The original part is a two-bay block, followed by a cross-wing to the left, a parallel range to the rear, and a further wing to the left. There are two storeys with attics, and a dentil eaves cornice to the brick extensions. The windows are replacement casements.
Little Lyth Farmhouse; 52.65637°N 2.77470°W	—	Late 17th century	A timber framed farmhouse with plastered infill and a tile roof, it consists of a three-bay hall range, a single-bay cross-wing projecting to the left, and a rear wing. There are two storeys and cellars, a gabled porch, and 19th-century casement windows.
Barn, Pulley Hall; 52.67998°N 2.76288°W	—	Late 17th to early 18th century (probable)	The barn is timber framed with brick infill on a brick plinth, and has a tile roof with crow-stepped gables. It is on two levels, and has ten or eleven bays.
Christ Church; 52.67483°N 2.75985°W	—	1842–43	The church was designed by Edward Haycock, the chancel was added in 1886, and the church has since been converted into a house. It is built in conglomerate stone with ashlar sandstone dressings and the top two stages of the tower, and a tile roof. The church consists of a nave, a chancel, a southeast vestry and a west tower. The tower is thin with four stepped stages, and has lancet windows and an embattled parapet.
