= Bayston Hill =

Village and civil parish in Shropshire, England

Coordinates: 52.6727°N 2.7654°W

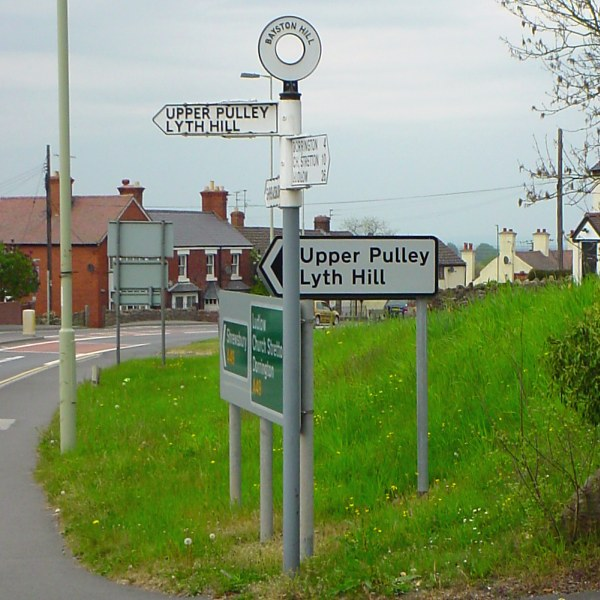
- Bayston Hill signpost

- Location within Shropshire
- Population: 5,079 (2011)
- OS grid reference: SJ482086
- Civil parish: Bayston Hill
- Unitary authority: Shropshire
- Ceremonial county: Shropshire
- Region: West Midlands
- Country: England
- Sovereign state: United Kingdom
- Post town: SHREWSBURY
- Postcode district: SY3
- Dialling code: 01743
- Police: West Mercia
- Fire: Shropshire
- Ambulance: West Midlands
- UK Parliament: Shrewsbury

Bayston Hill is a village and civil parish in Shropshire, England. It is 3 miles (5 km) south of the county town Shrewsbury and located on the main A49 road, the Shrewsbury to Hereford road.

Occupied continuously since before the Middle Ages, the village had a population of 5,079 residents in 2,172 households in the 2011 census. Bayston Hill has three public houses, two built churches (Church of England and Methodist), one primary school called Oakmeadow, and a public library.

Lyth Hill lies to the south of the village.

== History ==
=== Early history ===
There is remaining evidence of both an ancient British Iron Age hillfort and a Roman settlement located on the village's high grounds. In the Middle Ages the heavily wooded Bayston Hill and Condover area was established as a Royal hunting forest.

Standing on the east side is the village's oldest archaeological site: a mounded Iron Age bivallate hillfort, relatively low lying for such a structure and oddly named with the Danish name of The Burgs, but probably was not called that until sometime between the 14th and 16th centuries.

The village was surveyed for the Domesday Book during the year 1086, when it was called Begestan. William Pantulf, an Anglo-Norman nobleman, held land there.

A busy rope works, complete with its own windmill built in 1835, existed on Lyth Hill in the 19th century, supplying the many mines, farms and barge owners across the district.

=== Buildings ===
Great Lyth manor house was built in 1638 but had fallen into dereliction by 1948. In recent years it has been rescued and renovated. The present Lord of Wrentnall, Baron of Pulverbatch, is also the present Lord of Great Lyth. {Farrow, M. MA Cantab, Barony of Pulverbatch, Manors of Pulverbatch, Wrentnall, Great Lyth, Baron of Pulverbatch is R. SPRULES, 7 April 2003, copies at The British Library}.

In 1785 the London architect George Steuart designed and built a brick mansion house, Lythwood Hall for the Blakeway family, which was accessed via a sweeping driveway through landscaped gardens to the west of the village. Steuart went on to build Attingham Hall for the 1st Lord Berwick but Lythwood Hall fell into disrepair under the squireship of the Hulton-Harrop family in the 1890s. It was later split into multi-ownership units.

Bayston Hill was established as a new ecclesiastical parish with the building of Christ Church in 1843 by Edward Haycock, as an amalgamation of sections from the parishes of St. Julian's Shrewsbury, Meole Brace and nearby Condover. The church was built to serve the local miners, quarrymen and railway navvies. The ecclesiastical parish is part of the Diocese of Lichfield.

=== Modern history ===
Although the Shrewsbury and Hereford Railway (now the Welsh Marches Line), runs straight past the village, Bayston Hill has never had its own railway station.

The village became a civil parish in the reorganisation of 1967.

The original 1843 Christ Church church building still stands. A modern successor church was built on a more central site for the newer housing estates in the early 1980s.

In 2001 an application to further extend the Bayston Hill quarry was turned down, after a detailed survey identified six previously unknown historical sites of archaeological importance that would be destroyed by the proposed extension. These included sections of at least one or possibly two AD 43–450 Roman roads, two 1066–1547 medieval or mid 16th century post-medieval roads or trackways, a group of cropmarks suggesting historical earthworks or buildings, and a group of three medieval parish boundary stones.

In August 2003, the section of the A5 road at Bayston Hill was closed, after a large black cat was claimed to have been sighted at the service station. Experts from the West Midland Safari Park assisted a police helicopter in search for the cat, which was not found.

In early 2012 plans to change Bayston Hill's status to a town were abandoned, following concerns by residents. The plans would have seen a Mayor and Deputy Mayor appointed.

== Literary ==
The 1920s novels House in Dormer Forest and Seven for a Secret were written at Spring Cottage, Lyth Hill by romantic novelist Mary Webb, who lived near the village on and off for ten years, alternating between Spring Cottage and her London home, until her death in 1927. The action in her most famous novel Precious Bane took place around the nearby Bomere Pool, that she called Sarn Mere. The oldest known ghost in Shropshire, a dead Roman soldier, is also reputed to haunt Bomere Pool, the site of a Roman army camp and its associated civilian settlement.

A further literary connection can be found in the Brother Cadfael medieval detective novels of Ellis Peters, with much of the action in several stories taking place within the traditional forest, lanes and footpaths in and around Bayston Hill, or between the village and other surrounding medieval settlements.

== Governance ==
=== Parish ===
The village has a parish council, which contains 15 elected councillors, currently chaired by ex-Indian Army officer, and Amnesty International campaigner James Moraghen. In early 2008 the council took the radical step of appointing two young persons aged between 14 and 18 to represent the views of the village youth at council meetings.

=== County ===
The village is part of a Shropshire Council electoral division that returns 3 members to Shirehall. This division is made up of Bayston Hill, Column and Sutton, with a total population at the 2011 Census of 11,982. The current members are Ted Clarke, Tony Parsons and Rosemary Dartnall. With an electorate of over 11,000, the division is the only one in the county to return 3 members.

=== Westminster ===
The village is part of the Shrewsbury constituency. Julia Buckley of the Labour Party is the current Member of Parliament representing the constituency.

== Geography ==
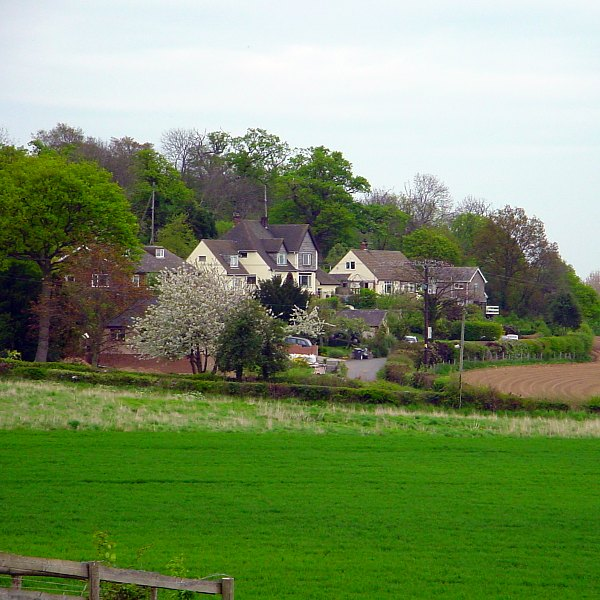
Berries Lane

Bayston Hill stands on an outcropping spur, of a Pre-Cambrian limestone and sandstone sedimentary rock extension of the Longmyndian range, intruding into the Shropshire plain, with major appearances at Longden, Lyth Hill, Bayston Hill, and Sharpstone Hill. North of the River Severn it does not outcrop again until it appears east of Shrewsbury as Haughmond Hill. The sediments were laid down under a vast warm ocean, surrounded by many volcanoes that were ground down by later Ice Age glaciers, which provided the fertile soil that contributed to Bayston Hill becoming a successful farming community throughout medieval times. There are still several active geological fault lines underlying the area; on 2 April 1990 Bayston Hill experienced an earthquake, measuring 5.4 on the Richter Scale, that was centred on Bishop's Castle.

The village lies just three miles south of Shrewsbury, and is separated from the county town by the main A5 Trunk road. It has good road transport links, with easy access to both the A49 and A5. To the south lies the pre-Cambrian Lyth Hill, with Sharpstone Hill standing to the east, the latter now mostly a major sandstone quarry with little of the hill itself now remaining after several hundred years of constant quarrying activities. Along with this, the quarry also exports a type of greywacke aggregate for the surface of the Bahrain International Circuit, the host of the Bahrain Grand Prix and the 8 Hours of Bahrain, as well as the Yas Marina Circuit which hosts the Abu Dhabi Grand Prix.

== Facilities ==
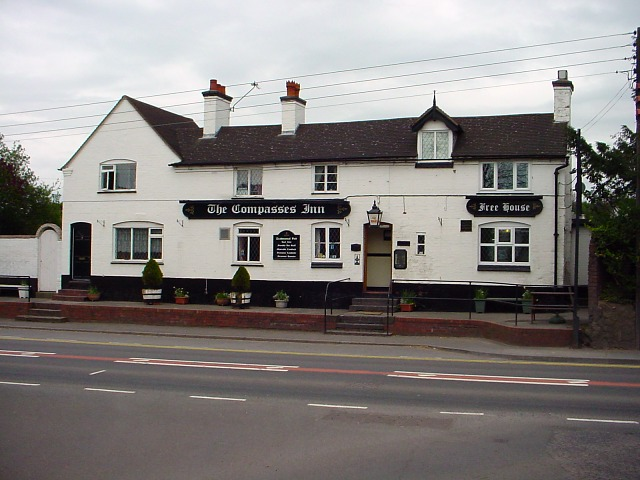
The Compasses Inn, next to the A49, is one of three pubs in Bayston Hill.

The village facilities include a Women's Institute, the Mary Webb Library which is open all day on Tuesdays, Thursdays and Fridays and Saturday mornings, and a large doctors' surgery The Beeches Medical Practice. The village hall, known as Bayston Hill Memorial Hall, was built as a war memorial to local men who died serving in World War I, who are listed on a Roll of Honour inside the building, and also honours those who died in World War II, whose names are listed on plaques either side of the main entrance.

There are two built churches in the village. Christ Church, on Glebe Road, is an evangelical Anglican parish and fellowship church. Bayston Hill Methodist Church is on Lansdowne Road. In 2000 another church affiliated to the Kingdom Faith Church movement, The Storehouse, was started which meets in the Memorial Hall.

Within the village are three public houses, The Three Fishes, the Compasses Inn and The Beeches. The Beeches is the only one in the newer part of Bayston Hill; the other two are on the older side of the village on the A49. Another pub on this road, The Fox, was demolished in August 2012 and replaced with housing.

The Village Association organises several well-supported annual events, an annual Christmas carol concert at the parade, and distributes a free monthly newsletter publication known as the "Villager" to every village household, which contains useful information about local events and amenities.

== Education ==
There is no secondary school in the village, with children over the age of eleven attending a range of secondary schools in the rest of Shrewsbury or Church Stretton.

There were two primary schools in the village, Longmeadow and Oakland Primary Schools. Falling pupil numbers led to local discussions about amalgamating the schools. The idea was supported by some and opposed by others in the community. In September 2008 the statutory notices were formally served by Shropshire County Council and the Diocese of Lichfield, stating their intent to discontinue both Oakland and Longmeadow schools as from 31 August 2009. The Diocese of Lichfield was invited to establish a new Church of England school in Bayston Hill on 1 September 2009. After a vote, the new establishment was named Oakmeadow and its uniform purple. The children of junior age are educated on the old Longmeadow site, and originally infants were to be educated at the Oakland site. However, the Longmeadow site has been extended to house the whole school. The Oakland site has been replaced by housing and a cul-de-sac named Treetop Avenue.

== Notable people ==
- Thomas Parr (1769-1847), merchant and former slave trader, bought and lived at Lythwood Hall after retiring from business in Liverpool.
- Violet Bland (1863–1940), suffragette, born in Bayston Hill, lived on Stretton Road.
- Sir Harold Baxter Kittermaster KCMG KBE (1879–1939), colonial governor, was son of a Vicar of Bayston Hill.
- Mary Webb (1881–1927) author, built and lived in Spring Cottage, Lyth Hill near Bayston Hill with her husband for the latter period of her life. While the cottage was being built, she lodged in Bayston Hill.
- Major-General Eric Miles CB DSO MC (1891–1977), British Army officer in both World Wars, lived from 1956 to his death at house called Rope Walk on Lyth Hill.
- Flt Lt Eric Lock DSO DFC & Bar (1919 in Bayston Hill – 1941) a Battle of Britain RAF air ace pilot, One of The Few. He is remembered today on the Runnymede Memorial and Eric Lock Road in Bayston Hill is named after him.
- Christopher Timothy (born 1940) TV and film actor lived in the village at Lythwood Hall, portrayed James Herriott in the 1980s, has featured in the BBC soap dramas Doctors and EastEnders.
- Andrew (Andy) Jones, bassist of The Flex lived on Langley Drive 1988–2008.

=== Sport ===
- Bert Harry (1897–1966) professional footballer notably for Crystal Palace, lived in retirement at Betley Villas, Bayston Hill, from 1963 to his death.
- Sarah Adlington (born 1986) British judoka athlete who took part in the 2020 Olympics, grew up in Bayston Hill.
- Jake Walker (born 2000) footballer formerly of Aston Villa, now playing in the Cymru Premier, born in Bayston Hill.

== See also ==
- Listed buildings in Bayston Hill
- Pulley
