= Pulley, Shropshire =

Village in Shropshire, England

Coordinates: 52.680°N 2.766°W

Pulley
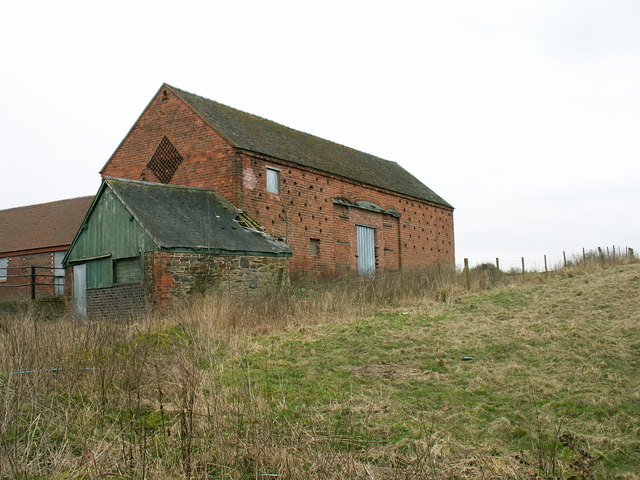
- Farm buildings at Pulley

- Location within Shropshire
- OS grid reference: SJ482094
- Civil parish: Bayston Hill
- Unitary authority: Shropshire
- Ceremonial county: Shropshire
- Region: West Midlands
- Country: England
- Sovereign state: United Kingdom
- Post town: SHREWSBURY
- Postcode district: SY3
- Dialling code: 01743
- Police: West Mercia
- Fire: Shropshire
- Ambulance: West Midlands
- UK Parliament: Shrewsbury and Atcham

Pulley is a small village 3 miles (5 km) south-west of Shrewsbury in Shropshire, England. It is located between Shrewsbury and Bayston Hill. The population at the 2011 Census is listed under Bayston Hill. The A5 Shrewsbury by-pass cuts through the area.

To the north is the Shrewsbury suburb of Meole Brace.

== History ==
The modern placename of "Pulley" is listed in Folio 259r, and 260v, in the Domesday Book (c.1086) at the UK National Archives and was then spelled as "Polelie".

== See also ==
- Listed buildings in Bayston Hill
