= Cound Brook =

River in Shropshire, England

Coordinates: 52.6524°N 2.6426°W

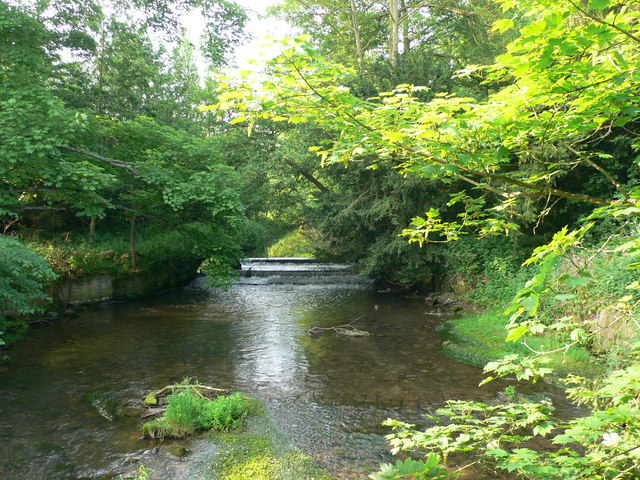
- Cound Brook viewed from Longnor Bridge

Location
- Country: England
- County: Shropshire
- Villages: Leebotwood, Longnor, Dorrington, Condover, Cantlop, Cound

Physical characteristics
- Source: Stretton Hills
  - location: All Stretton
  - elevation: 176 m (577 ft)
- Mouth: River Severn
  - location: Eyton on Severn
  - elevation: 41 m (135 ft)
- Length: 36 km (22 mi)from furthest source

Basin features
- Tributaries
  - right: Row Brook, Coundmoor Brook

Cound Brook (pronounced COOnd) is a tributary of the River Severn in Shropshire, England, running to south of the county town Shrewsbury. The Cound Brook rises in the Stretton Hills, and enters the River Severn at Eyton on Severn after winding its way for 22 miles (35 km) across the southern Shropshire-Severn plain. This length is measured from high on the Long Mynd (near Boiling Well).

The flow of the Cound Brook can vary from sluggish in a dry summer to a raging torrent in winter or spring. The river is crossed by several bridges along its route, including two historic and unusual iron bridges. Several other roads cross the river as fords. The river has breached its banks on the lower flood plain several times in the past, and is now monitored by the local rivers authority.

The river is named after Cound, the last settlement it passes through prior to the confluence with the River Severn. Conversely, one of the villages on its route, Condover, is thought to have been named after the river during the late medieval period.

The Coundmoor Brook is a smaller watercourse which flows into the Cound Brook at Cound, near its confluence with the Severn.

== Sources ==
The Cound rises from minor watercourses running off the Long Mynd and Caer Caradoc in the northern part of the "Stretton Gap", between the settlements of Church Stretton and All Stretton. One of the main initial tributaries is the stream that runs through the Carding Mill Valley, which is named "Ashbrook" as it flows through Church Stretton. In the village of All Stretton, the Ashbrook combines with another considerable stream that comes down the Batch valley, effectively forming the beginning of the Cound, at grid reference SO461953. The embryonic river descends towards the Shropshire-Severn plain and heads north east, mirroring the route of the A49 main road and the Shrewsbury to Hereford railway line.

== Middle route ==
The brook passes through Leebotwood, then through the medieval deer park west of Longnor, followed by a combined ford and weir at The Old Forge. Continuing to the east of Dorrington village, beyond Stapleton the Cound changes direction and heads eastwards.

The Cound passes through the historic and picturesque Condover, with its conservation area and many listed buildings. A water mill was recorded as standing on the Cound in Condover at the time of the Domesday Book. After Condover, the river flows through a ford, then bends rightwards around Boreton and heads south-east.

== Iron bridges ==
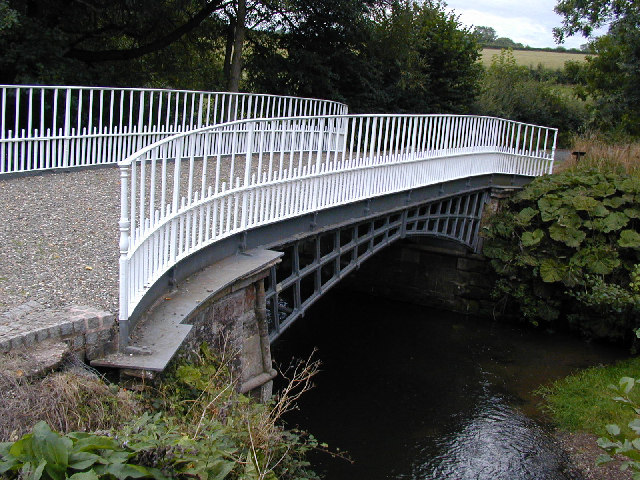
Thomas Telford's Cantlop Bridge, built in 1818

To the north of the village of Cantlop there is an unusual cast-iron single-span bridge known as the Cantlop Bridge, that was designed and constructed by Thomas Telford in 1818. Originally a road bridge to cross the Cound Brook, it remains only as a historic monument, as the original 19th century road route is now diverted alongside on a modern bridge.

After being joined by the Row Brook, the river then passes through the village of Cound and under another cast-iron bridge, the Cound Arbour Bridge, designed and built by Telford in 1797, the oldest iron bridge still in normal everyday use by vehicles anywhere in the world. (Abraham Darby's famous Iron Bridge in Ironbridge, Telford, had closed to vehicular traffic in 1934, and is now open only to pedestrians.)

== Mouth ==
The Cound Brook now follows an increasingly meandering route across a low-lying flood plain, until it joins the River Severn a few hundred yards west of Eyton on Severn and about a mile south from Wroxeter (with its Roman city ruins), which is close to the northern end of the Watling Street Roman road from Dover.
