= National Cycle Route 44 =

Cycle route in the United Kingdom

Coordinates: 52.387°N 2.764°W

National Cycle Network Route 44, part of the National Cycle Network, is a 31.1 mile cycle route, connecting Shrewsbury, Shropshire with Cinderford, Gloucestershire. The part of the route from Shrewsbury to Bromfield is signed - the remainder of the route is currently unsigned.

The section from Shrewsbury to Leominster is advertised as the Six Castles Cycleway. The six castles on or near the route are (in geographical order from north to south): Shrewsbury Castle, Bishop's Castle, Stokesay Castle, Ludlow Castle, Richard's Castle and Croft Castle.

== Route ==
=== Shrewsbury-Bromfield ===
The route begins in Shrewsbury, one mile west of the town centre, where it links up with National Cycle Route 81. The formal start point of the route is on Shelton Road (the B4380), at the junction with Woodfield Avenue, where route 81 exists on its way between Shelton and the town centre. Route 44 heads southeast along the B4380 to Longden Road Roundabout, where it turns off onto Longden Road out of Shrewsbury, passing the Priory and Meole Brace secondary schools. The first village outside of Shrewsbury is Hook-a-Gate. After passing through Hook-a-Gate and the neighbouring hamlet of Annscroft, the route turns off along country lanes to Arscott and then Shorthill, where it meets the A488. The route crosses over the main road and along country lanes again to the large village of Pontesbury, where again it meets the A488.

After Pontesbury the route again follows country lanes and heads south to Habberley and then after this village, west to Minsterley, where the route again meets the A488. The route then heads along the B4499 to Priest Weston, on the Shropshire-Wales border, passing to the west of the Stiperstones hills. It briefly enters Powys, including the village of Churchstoke (or Church Stoke), where it meets the A489. After Church Stoke, the route is on country lanes again and heads roughly southeast to the small (English) town of Bishop's Castle.

After passing through Bishop's Castle and crossing the A488, the route then roughly runs southeast to Craven Arms, passing to the north of the village of Lydbury North and running through the hamlet of Round Oak. At Craven Arms the route crosses the Marches railway line and the busy A49 to the hamlet of Halford, after which it runs along the B4368 east-bound for a short distance, before heading south on a country lane to Onibury and after that village, southeast on another country lane, passing through Ludlow Racecourse and Golf Club, before reaching the village of Bromfield. At Bromfield is the Ludlow Food Centre and the route meets the A49 again.

=== Bromfield-Cinderford ===
After Bromfield it passes just to the west of the historic market town of Ludlow and then continues in a southerly direction into Herefordshire, first to Leominster (where the route goes through the town) and then to Hereford, where it joins up with National Cycle Route 46. After Hereford, route 44 heads in a roughly southeast direction to Cinderford, via Ross-on-Wye. At Cinderford it links up with National Cycle Route 42.

== Regional Route 32/33 ==
Originally the National Route 44 was planned to go Shrewsbury-Church Stretton-Craven Arms (and then continuing to Cinderford as above) but the section from Shrewsbury to Craven Arms was re-routed via Bishop's Castle. Instead the original Church Stretton route is now designated as a (West Midlands) regional route, numbered either 32 or 33. It is at present unsigned, but appears for example on the Six Castles Cycleway leaflet.

This regional route is not yet signed along the route. The first stage of signing is expected to be Shrewsbury to Church Stretton and would begin at Greyfriars Bridge close to the centre of Shrewsbury (where it connects with national route 81) and end at Church Stretton railway station, a length of around 15 miles. Almost all the route in on country lanes, as well as the cycle path along a disused railway trackbed in Shrewsbury, which takes the route across the Rea Brook and through Sutton Farm. The route however has to cross the busy A49 road and also runs for a short distance along the A458 near Shrewsbury.

Between Shrewsbury (Coleham) and Church Stretton, the route passes through the villages and hamlets of Betton Strange, Condover, Great Ryton (and Little Ryton), Longnor and All Stretton. The route is downhill from Church Stretton to Shrewsbury, descending from 190 metres (620 ft) to 55 metres (180 ft).
