= Longnor, Shropshire =

Village in Shropshire, England

Coordinates: 52.601°N 2.756°W

Longnor
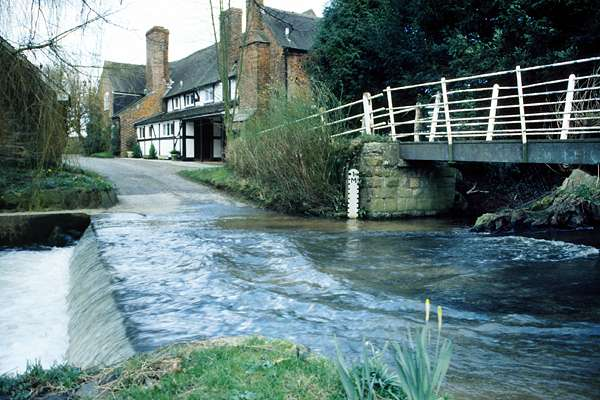
- The ford at the Old Forge, Longnor

- Location within Shropshire
- Population: 289 (2011)
- OS grid reference: SJ485005
- Civil parish: Longnor
- Unitary authority: Shropshire
- Ceremonial county: Shropshire
- Region: West Midlands
- Country: England
- Sovereign state: United Kingdom
- Post town: SHREWSBURY
- Postcode district: SY5
- Dialling code: 01743
- Police: West Mercia
- Fire: Shropshire
- Ambulance: West Midlands
- UK Parliament: Shrewsbury and Atcham

Longnor is a village and civil parish off the A49 road, south of Dorrington and north of Leebotwood in Shropshire, England, with a population of 289. The nearest railway station is Church Stretton, 4.7 miles (7.6 km) away. The Cound Brook flows just west of the village and its medieval deer park. The village contains Longnor Hall and the Grade I listed medieval St Mary's Church. Regional Cycle Route 32/33 passes through, as do buses between Church Stretton and Shrewsbury and Radbrook Green. The village is also noted for a ghost, the White Lady of Longnor.

== Facilities ==
=== Church ===
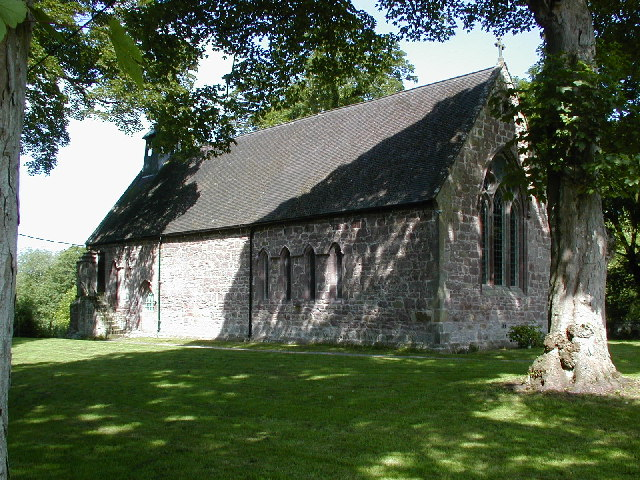
Longnor Church from the north-east

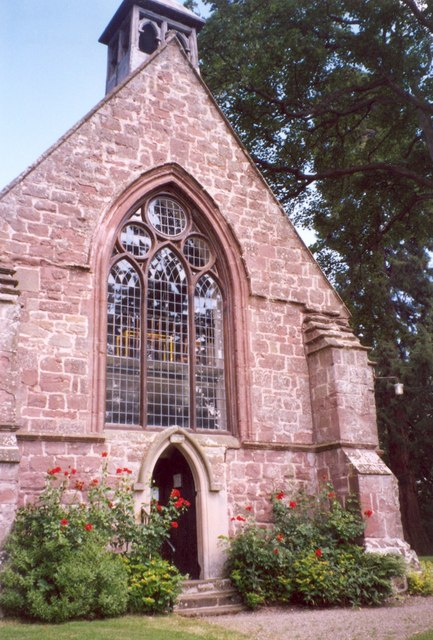
Longnor Church from the west

St. Mary's Church is a Grade I Listed Building in the medieval Early English style, dated to around 1280. It has been continually and carefully conserved down the centuries. Two new stained glass windows were installed in 2000, to mark the turn of the millennium.

Originally a chapel for Condover, it became a private chapel for the Corbett family of Longnor Hall, before taking on the function of a parish church.

Longnor was the birthplace of Samuel Lee (1783–1852), a linguist, Cambridge academic and Anglican cleric, whose translations from the Bible and other religious works into Arabic and other languages helped to launch the missionary activities of the Evangelical movement in the first half of the 19th century.

=== Education ===
Longnor CE Primary School, the village primary school, had 112 pupils aged five to eleven in January 2011. Its 2018 SAT results put it in England's top 1 per cent of schools for the proportion of children reaching and exceeding expected standards in writing and mathematics.

Its attached pre-school section is called Little Owls. The nearest secondary school is in Church Stretton.

== Local government ==
=== Leebotwood & Longnor PC ===
Longnor shares a parish council with the village of Leebotwood. In 2008, the electorate in the parish was 343 members, who vote on matters such as improving the quality of life of the two communities and looking after the environment. It influences and works alongside the principal authority Shropshire Council, Police, Highways Agency, PCT.

== Longnor Hall and the Corbetts ==
Longnor Hall features a park and formal gardens. The park originated in the 14th century; formal gardens were laid out in the 17th century. The 18th-century park and modern gardens survive.

The hall was begun by Sir Richard Corbett in 1670 as a successor to Roger Sprencheaux's fortified manor house of 1235, and completed in 1693 under his son Uvedale Corbett. Some alterations were made in 1838–1842 by the architect and builder Edward Haycock Sr.

The Corbett family had arrived in Shropshire with the Norman Conquest, under Hugh Corbet. The branch of the family that lived in Longnor dated from the 1500s. The last of the family was Jane Corbett, who married Archdeacon Joseph Plymley; he took his wife's surname to inherit the estate.

== Farming ==
Longnor has various farms, three of which are Upper House Farm, The Farm, and Green Farm. These form the main economic force in the area, most of the employment being agricultural throughout history. Green Farm specializes in dairy cattle. It installed a modern milking facility in 2010.

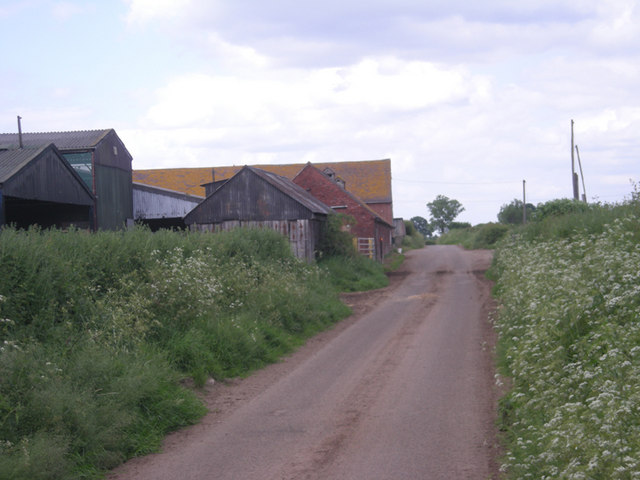
View of Green Farm, from the Roman Road

== Natural features ==
=== Cound Brook ===
Cound Brook is a 25-mile-long (40 km) tributary of the River Severn running from the All Stretton area through Longnor and Condover and emptying into the Severn near Cound. Longnor lies in the middle section of Cound Brook. Having rainwater runoff from the Stretton Hills join it, the brook widens, passing to the east of Leebotwood and west of Longnor and the Medieval deer park there. Continuing east of Dorrington village, it changes direction to east at Stapleton. The flow can vary from slow and sluggish in a dry summer to a torrent in winter or spring.

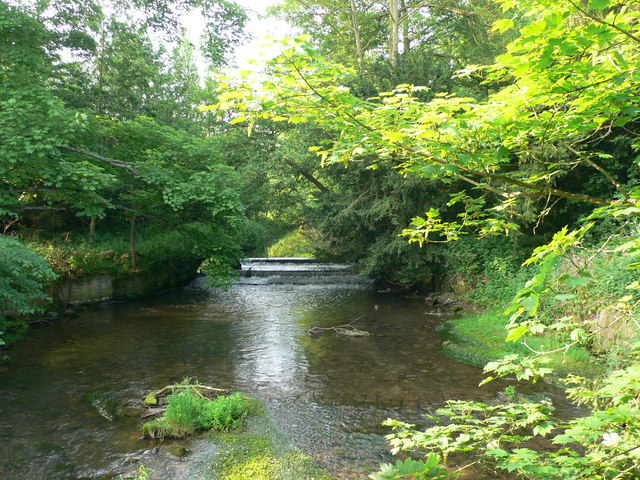
The Cound Brook from Longnor Bridge

=== Medieval deer park ===
The medieval deer park was an enclosed area bounded by a ditch and bank with a wooden park palisade. The ditch was typically on the inside, so that deer could enter the park but not leave it.

== Climate and environment ==
The temperate climate in the Longnor area is typical for its region. However, occasional extremes can occur. In April 2012, there were snow storms.

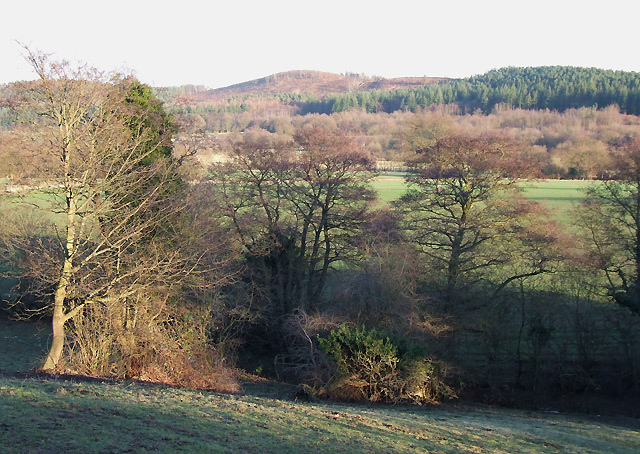
View of the countryside in the area of Longnor

== History ==
In 1870–1872, John Marius Wilson's Imperial Gazetteer of England and Wales described Longnor like this: Longnor, a village and a parish in Church-Stretton district, Salop. The village stands on the Cound Brook, near Watling-street, 1½ miles NNE of Leebotwood railway station, and 5 NNE of Church-Stretton; and is supposed to occupy the site of a Roman [military] station. The parish comprises 1,200 acres; and its Post town is Leebotwood, under Shrewsbury. Real property, £3,656; of which £88 are in mines. Pop[ulation]., 244. Houses, 48. The property is divided among a few. Longnor Hall is a chief residence. Coal is found, but is worked less now than formerly. The living is a vicarage annexed to the vicarage of Leebotwood, in the diocese of Lichfield. The church is ancient but good; and belonged formerly to Haughmond Abbey. There are a national school, and charities £44. The Rev. Samuel Lee, late professor of Arabic at Cambridge, was a native.

=== Shropshire ghost ===
The White Lady of Longnor is said to appear clothed in a long white wedding dress, on or by the road bridge near the village. She is thought to have thrown herself into the water below after being deserted at the altar.

== Transport ==
=== Road ===
A49

Route information
- Length: 140 mi (230 km)

Location
- Country: United Kingdom
- Constituent country: England

Road network
- Roads in the United Kingdom; Motorways; A and B road zones

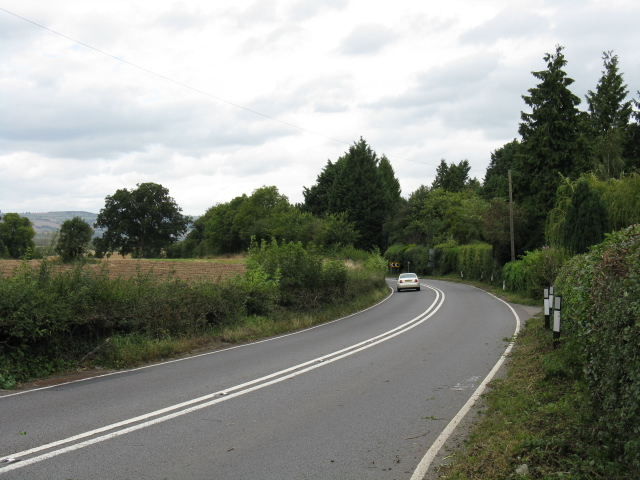
A49 Near North Lodge, to the North of Longnor

The A49 is the main road that passes by Longnor just to the west of the village. It heads north and south, traversing the Welsh Marches between Hereford and Wigan. It provides the main routes between Longnor and surrounding towns and villages, notably Shrewsbury and Church Stretton. Church Stretton as the nearest town for shopping. The A49 is also the bus route for Longnor: the No. 435 stops just north of the village.

=== Cycling ===
Route 32/33 links the village with the National Cycle Network, which runs between Little Ryton and All Stretton as part of National Cycle Route 44.

=== Trains ===
The nearest railway station to Longnor is 4.7 miles (7.6 km) off at Church Stretton on the Welsh Marches line, beside the 435 bus route. The nearest mainline station is in Shrewsbury, 7.7 miles (12.4 km) to the north.

=== Buses ===
Longnor is served by bus routes numbered 435 and 540. Both start from Church Stretton, being the largest town nearby. The 435 takes in a number of different villages, including Longnor, on its way to Shrewsbury. The 540 runs to Radbrook Green, a suburb of Shrewsbury.

== See also ==
- Listed buildings in Longnor, Shropshire
