= Stapleton, Shropshire =

Village in Shropshire, England

Coordinates: 52.635°N 2.786°W

Stapleton
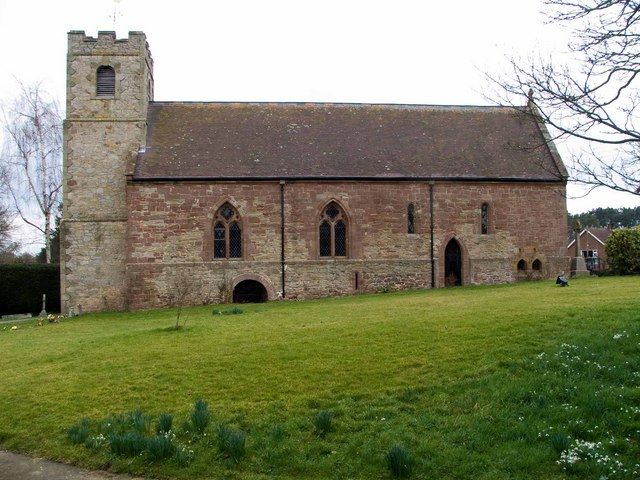
- St John the Baptist parish church. Parish war memorial stands (right) outside east end.

- Location within Shropshire
- Population: 245
- OS grid reference: SJ469045
- Civil parish: Condover
- Unitary authority: Shropshire
- Ceremonial county: Shropshire
- Region: West Midlands
- Country: England
- Sovereign state: United Kingdom
- Post town: Shrewsbury
- Postcode district: SY5
- Dialling code: 01743
- Police: West Mercia
- Fire: Shropshire
- Ambulance: West Midlands
- UK Parliament: Shrewsbury and Atcham
- Website: Condover Parish Council

Stapleton (/steɪpəltən/) is a village and former civil parish, now in the parish of Condover, in Shropshire, England. It neighbours the villages of Exfords Green and Dorrington, and is closely bypassed by the A49. It is near the town of Shrewsbury and near the Shropshire Hills Area of Outstanding Natural Beauty. In Stapleton is a 12th-century church with a cemetery and First World War war memorial site.

== History ==
There is an embankment in the parish that has been suggested to be the remains of a Roman station. The Church of England parish church of St John the Baptist is an ancient building that was re-seated in 1790.

Stapleton was an ancient parish in the Condover division of the Hundred of Condover, and was a civil parish until 1 April 1967, following which it became part of the present civil parish of Condover.

The Stapleton parish contains the hamlets of Upper and Lower Moat, Netley, Shady Moor, and Vinnels. 235 people lived in Stapleton in 1831 but by 1961 the population had shrunk to 191, and it is estimated that in 2011 it had grown to 245. In 1831 there were 45 houses to house the 235 people that lived in the village which means on average 5–6 people lived in each house; by 1961 there were 55 houses to house the 191 people which is an average of 3–4 people in each home. Out of the 72 people employed in 1831 in Stapleton 56 worked in agriculture including farmers and labourers who worked for them. From this we can see that farming and agriculture dominated the workforce of Stapleton. One of the places people worked is The Old Dairy, which is still a working farm today.

== Parish church ==
The church is notable for the fact that on the top of the thick walls of a Saxon or Early Norman building a second church (on one side presently above the level of the churchyard soil) was built in the 12th century, thus creating two storeys, which were then moved into the current lofty building. The unified building was lit by 14th century windows. In the churchyard is a large tumulus supposed to be of Saxon origin. The church organ is among the top six hundred in the country and there is a small tapestry piece in the nave said to have been worked by Mary, Queen of Scots. The church of St John the Baptist was originally a dependent chapelry of Condover, and as such paid 10 shillings annually to the Shrewsbury Abbey, which had taken the advowson, or patronage, of the mother church. The church building, which seats 122, was restored in 1866, when the windows of the lower church were discovered. The then Rector, the Rev. Hon. C.W.A. Fielding, entered an account of the restoration, with illustrations, in the Vestry Book. A brass plaque commemorates Fielding's son, Lieutenant Bertram Francis Percy Fielding, Wiltshire Regiment, who was killed in a mutiny at Fort Lubwas in Uganda in 1897.

In the churchyard is a war memorial stone Celtic cross to men of the parish who died serving in World War I.

== Domesday Book ==
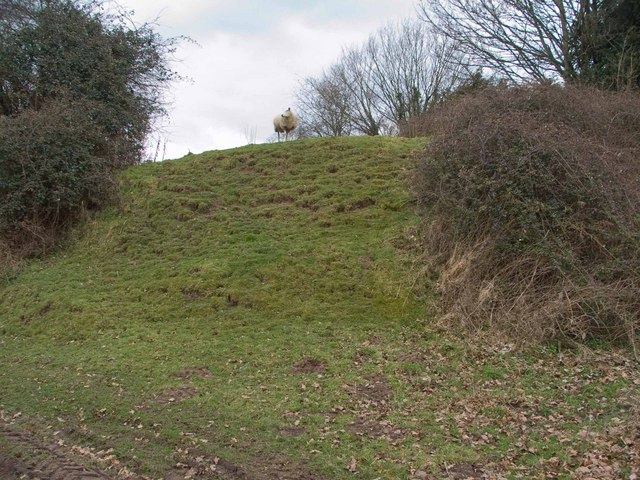
Stapleton Motte

The Domesday Book of 1086 records Stapleton under the name Hundeslit. Stapleton was previously held as two manors by two Saxon franklins, Huning and Aelric and in 1086 it was divided between Roger Fitz Corbet and Alward the Saxon. It is likely that the mound near the Church may have been the site of one of the Saxon manor houses. The other manor house stood about a mile away, where the remains of the De Stapleton's house still exists. The place was first recorded as Stapleton in the reign of King Stephen, when Baldwin de Meisy was Lord of Stapleton and Wistanstow. His descendants, who took the name of De Stapleton, held the manor till the beginning of the 15th century, when it passed to six co-heiresses, the daughters of Sir John Stapleton.

== Notable people ==
- Hugh Owen (topographer) (1761-1827), was Rector of Stapleton from 1819.

== See also ==
- Listed buildings in Condover
