= Dorrington, Shropshire =

Village in Shropshire, England

Coordinates: 52.623°N 2.773°W

Dorrington
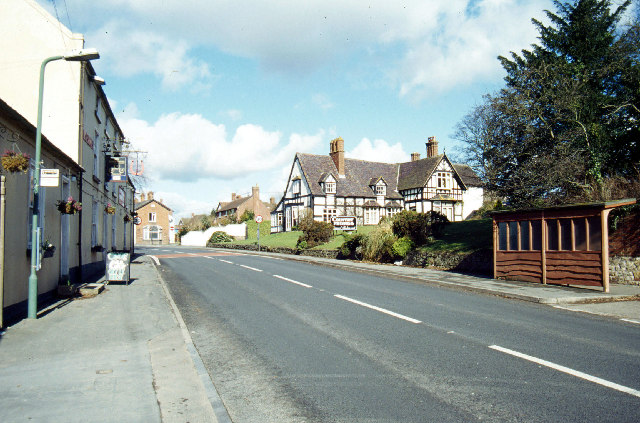
- Dorrington

- Location within Shropshire
- Population: 619 in 2008
- OS grid reference: SJ476031
- Civil parish: Condover
- Unitary authority: Shropshire
- Ceremonial county: Shropshire
- Region: West Midlands
- Country: England
- Sovereign state: United Kingdom
- Post town: SHREWSBURY
- Postcode district: SY5
- Dialling code: 01743
- Police: West Mercia
- Fire: Shropshire
- Ambulance: West Midlands
- UK Parliament: Shrewsbury

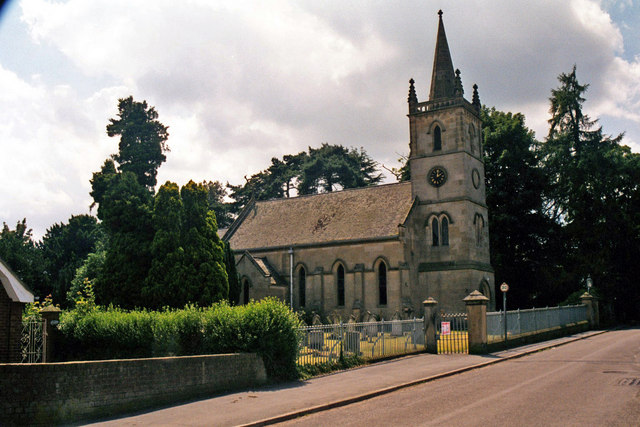
The church of Saint Edward

Dorrington is a village in the civil parish of Condover, in Shropshire, England, it is located 6 miles (9.7 km) south of Shrewsbury. The population of the village was estimated as being 619 in 2008.

The Cound Brook flows to the east of the village, and to the southwest is Netley Hall. The A49 road runs through the village, which has a number of businesses located both in a small business park and along the main road. The public house, The Horseshoes, is a Grade II listed building. The village also has a Persian restaurant, a convenience store, a butcher's shop, a post office and numerous other small businesses. There is also a primary school and a village hall. The village Church of England church is dedicated to Saint Edward.

To the east is Ryton. Both Ryton and Dorrington lie in the civil parish of Condover. Dorrington forms a ward of the parish and sends four councillors to the parish council.

== Railways ==
The village did once have a railway station on the Shrewsbury and Hereford Railway, opened in 1852. The station closed in 1958, although the modern Welsh Marches Line still runs through the village. On the site of the station's goods yard, which is located just to the east of the village, is now an oil depot and a plant hire depot.

== Other public transport ==
Minsterley Motors route 435 (Shrewsbury-Ludlow and vice versa) runs through Dorrington, on its way between Condover (to the northeast) and the Strettons (to the south). The service runs Monday-Saturday.

== Notable people ==
- William Farr (1807–1883), epidemiologist and one of the founders of medical statistics, was effectively adopted, at the age of two, by a local squire, Joseph Pryce, when Farr and his family moved to Dorrington from Kenley. Pryce died in November 1828, and left Farr £500, which allowed him to study medicine in France and Switzerland.
- Freddie Fox (jockey) (1888-1945) grew up in Dorrington where he was educated at the village school and was choirboy in St Edward's Church, before leaving Shropshire at age 12.
- Bert Harry (1897-1966), former professional footballer notably for Crystal Palace, was landlord of the Horseshoes Inn from 1954 to 1963.

== See also ==
- Listed buildings in Condover
- Dorrington Lane, an unrelated hamlet, in the extreme north-east of the county, near Woore
