= Grade II* listed buildings in Shropshire (district) (A–G) =

Shropshire shown in England

There are over 20,000 Grade II* listed buildings in England. This article comprises a list of these buildings in Shropshire (district) in the ceremonial county of Shropshire. The list has been sub-divided alphabetically, into entries beginning A-G and those beginning H-Z.

== List ==
Name	Location	Type	Completed (Note: The date given is the date used by Historic England as significant for the initial building or that of an important part in the structure's description.)	Date designated	Grid ref. (Note: The grid reference is based on the British national grid reference system, sometimes known as OSGB36, used by the Ordnance Survey.) Geo-coordinates	Entry number (Note: The "List Entry Number" is a unique number assigned to each listed building and scheduled monument by Historic England.)	Image
Remains of Abbey Guest House	Shrewsbury, Shropshire	Abbey	Late 13th century	30 May 1969	SJ4976812409; 52°42′25″N 2°44′42″W	1246394	Remains of Abbey Guest House More images
Abbey House	Shrewsbury, Shropshire	House	c. 1720	30 May 1969	SJ4998712506; 52°42′28″N 2°44′30″W	1271372	Abbey House More images
Abcott Manor	Abcott, Clungunford, Shropshire	House	C20	1 December 1951	SO3920478756; 52°24′12″N 2°53′42″W	1176056	Abcott Manor
Acton Burnell Hall (Concord College)	Acton Burnell, Shropshire	House	1731	29 January 1952	SJ5342202017; 52°36′50″N 2°41′22″W	1055567	Acton Burnell Hall (Concord College) More images
Acton Reynald Hall	Acton Reynald, Moreton Corbet and Lee Brockhurst, Shropshire	Country House	early-mid 17th century	28 October 1960	SJ5347023238; 52°48′17″N 2°41′30″W	1055371	Acton Reynald Hall More images
Acton Scott Hall including Service Court and Railings	Acton Scott, Shropshire	House	Medieval	12 November 1954	SO4557689522; 52°30′03″N 2°48′11″W	1383205	Acton Scott Hall including Service Court and Railings More images
Albright Hussey	Bomere Heath and District, Shropshire	Hotel	Mid-late 16th century	29 January 1952	SJ5020117591; 52°45′13″N 2°44′21″W	1295586	Albright Hussey More images
Albrighton Hall	Albrighton, Bomere Heath and District, Shropshire	Country House	c. 1675	11 July 1985	SJ4962718166; 52°45′31″N 2°44′52″W	1295552	Albrighton Hall More images
Aldenham Park	Morville, Shropshire	House	Earlier Queen Anne	29 November 1951	SO6707695366; 52°33′18″N 2°29′13″W	1188890	Aldenham Park More images
Alderton Hall	Great Ness, Shropshire	Farmhouse	1591	27 May 1953	SJ3855117345; 52°45′01″N 2°54′43″W	1055140	Upload Photo
Alkington Hall	Alkington, Whitchurch Rural, Shropshire	Farmhouse	1592	28 October 1960	SJ5305839267; 52°56′55″N 2°42′00″W	1055994	Alkington Hall More images
Apley Hall	Stockton, Shropshire	Country House	18th century	29 September 1951	SO7117798224; 52°34′52″N 2°25′36″W	1294171	Apley Hall More images
Apprentice House of former Ditherington Flax Mill	Ditherington, Shrewsbury, Shropshire	Apprentice House	c. 1812	10 September 1987	SJ4989013893; 52°43′13″N 2°44′36″W	1254855	Apprentice House of former Ditherington Flax Mill More images
Archway approx. one Metre to North East of Brand Hall	Norton in Hales, Shropshire	Archway	c. 1700	5 June 1987	SJ6921838370; 52°56′31″N 2°27′34″W	1056064	Archway approx. one Metre to North East of Brand Hall
Archway approx. one Metre to South East of Brand Hall	Norton in Hales, Shropshire	Archway	c. 1700	5 June 1987	SJ6921038346; 52°56′30″N 2°27′35″W	1177483	Archway approx. one Metre to South East of Brand Hall
Ash Hall	Ash Magna, Whitchurch Rural, Shropshire	Farmhouse	c1710-20	28 October 1960	SJ5706339854; 52°57′16″N 2°38′26″W	1366504	Upload Photo
Ashfield Hall	Much Wenlock, Shropshire	House	15th century	24 October 1950	SO6220399839; 52°35′42″N 2°33′34″W	1294389	Ashfield Hall More images
Ashford Hall	Ashford Bowdler, Shropshire	Country House	c. 1760	12 November 1954	SO5133971148; 52°20′10″N 2°42′56″W	1383604	Upload Photo
Astley House with adjoining Screen Wall and Coach House	Astley, Shropshire	House	Late 18th century	29 January 1952	SJ5280718640; 52°45′48″N 2°42′03″W	1366892	Upload Photo
Aston Hall	Shifnal, Shropshire	House	c. 1720	26 May 1955	SJ7560308046; 52°40′10″N 2°21′44″W	1308059	Aston Hall More images
Aston Hall and Wall and Gatepiers to South East and Gatepiers to North East	Aston Munslow, Shropshire	Manor House	16th century	12 November 1954	SO5089286615; 52°28′31″N 2°43′28″W	1383344	Upload Photo
Atcham Bridge	Atcham, Shropshire	Road Bridge	1769–1771	17 February 1985	SJ5405209307; 52°40′46″N 2°40′52″W	1176588	Atcham Bridge More images
Attached Railings to 1–8, Claremount Bank	Shrewsbury, Shropshire	Terrace	c. 1830	10 January 1953	SJ4882412596; 52°42′31″N 2°45′32″W	1271084	Attached Railings to 1–8, Claremount Bank
Attached Railings to 6, Quarry Place	Shrewsbury, Shropshire	House	Late 18th century	10 January 1953	SJ4882712330; 52°42′22″N 2°45′32″W	1254740	Attached Railings to 6, Quarry Place More images
Banqueting House approx. 80 Metres to South East of Eyton Farmhouse	Eyton on Severn, Wroxeter and Uppington, Shropshire	Banqueting House	c. 1607	13 June 1958	SJ5729006117; 52°39′04″N 2°37′58″W	1267039	Upload Photo
Barn adjoining Lower Spoad Farmhouse to North East	Newcastle on Clun, Shropshire	Barn	14th century or 15th century	21 March 1968	SO2569982065; 52°25′53″N 3°05′39″W	1174924	Upload Photo
Barns to west of Hall Farm House	Aston Eyre, Shropshire	House	15th century	9 March 1970	SO6528194145; 52°32′39″N 2°30′48″W	1053205	Barns to west of Hall Farm House
Batch Farm House	Sidbury, Shropshire	Farmhouse	16th century	9 March 1970	SO6805485221; 52°27′50″N 2°28′18″W	1294199	Batch Farm House
Baxter's House	Eaton Constantine, Leighton and Eaton Constantine, Shropshire	Farmhouse	Late 15th century	24 February 1986	SJ5991306248; 52°39′09″N 2°35′38″W	1055263	Upload Photo
Beech House British Waterways Board Canal Maintenance Depot, Beech House (nos. 2–6), Shropshire Union Canal (South East Side), Llangollen branch.	Birch, Ellesmere Rural, Shropshire	Flats	1806	25 April 1988	SJ4009034256; 52°54′09″N 2°53′32″W	1176445	Beech House British Waterways Board Canal Maintenance Depot, Beech House (nos. 2–6), Shropshire Union Canal (South East Side), Llangollen branch.
Belmont House	Shrewsbury, Shropshire	House	Late 17th century	10 January 1953	SJ4918712277; 52°42′21″N 2°45′13″W	1271319	Belmont House More images
Belswardyne Hall	Cressage, Shropshire	Farmhouse	Late 18th century	24 February 1986	SJ6026903285; 52°37′33″N 2°35′18″W	1055283	Upload Photo
Benthall Farmhouse	Alberbury with Cardeston, Shropshire	Farmhouse	1660	18 March 1986	SJ3946213965; 52°43′12″N 2°53′52″W	1366881	Upload Photo
Berwick Chapel	Bomere Heath and District, Shropshire	Chapel	1670	13 June 1958	SJ4732314823; 52°43′42″N 2°46′53″W	1366946	Berwick Chapel
Berwick House	Bomere Heath and District, Shropshire	Country House	Early 18th century	29 January 1952	SJ4705114794; 52°43′41″N 2°47′08″W	1055164	Berwick House More images
Bicton Grove Farmhouse	Bicton, Shropshire	Farmhouse	c. 1700	27 November 1987	SJ4512315020; 52°43′48″N 2°48′51″W	1366919	Upload Photo
Binnal	Astley Abbotts, Shropshire	House	16th century	9 March 1970	SO7017796862; 52°34′08″N 2°26′29″W	1307770	Upload Photo
Binweston Farmhouse	Binweston, Worthen with Shelve, Shropshire	House	Early 17th century	21 March 1968	SJ3011504101; 52°37′49″N 3°02′02″W	1055037	Upload Photo
Birch Farm House	Kinlet, Shropshire	Farmhouse	Early 18th century	9 March 1970	SO7336880862; 52°25′30″N 2°23′35″W	1294576	Upload Photo
Bishton Manor	Boningale, Shropshire	Jettied House	15th century	26 September 1984	SJ8041301751; 52°36′47″N 2°17′27″W	1274091	Upload Photo
Bitterley Court	Bitterley, Shropshire	Manor House	Mid 17th century core	12 November 1954	SO5709377248; 52°23′30″N 2°37′55″W	1383649	Bitterley Court More images
Blacksmith's and Joiner's Shop, British Waterways Board Canal Maintenance Depot	Birch, Ellesmere Rural, Shropshire	Workshops	c. 1806	25 April 1988	SJ4004134182; 52°54′06″N 2°53′34″W	1176422	Upload Photo
Blunden Hall and Old Hall Cottage	Bishop's Castle, Shropshire	House	17th century	28 July 1950	SO3253488383; 52°29′21″N 2°59′42″W	1054574	Upload Photo
Boreatton Hall	Baschurch, Shropshire	House	Earlier house on site	27 May 1953	SJ4133322905; 52°48′02″N 2°52′18″W	1055962	Upload Photo
Boscobel House	Boscobel, Shropshire	Farmhouse	16th century	29 September 1951	SJ8375208243; 52°40′18″N 2°14′30″W	1273964	Boscobel House More images
Bowdler's House	Woolstaston, Shropshire	Farmhouse	Late 14th century	6 January 1986	SO4524498384; 52°34′50″N 2°48′34″W	1055605	Bowdler's House More images
Boycott Hall Farmhouse	Pontesbury, Shropshire	Farmhouse	Late 15th century	10 March 1986	SJ3890007509; 52°39′43″N 2°54′17″W	1055688	Upload Photo
Brand Hall	Norton in Hales, Shropshire	Country House	17th century	10 February 1959	SJ6920638360; 52°56′30″N 2°27′35″W	1366457	Brand Hall More images
Bridge Number 438 (Belvidere Bridge)	Shrewsbury, Shropshire	Railway Bridge	1848	3 April 1985	SJ5194812526; 52°42′30″N 2°42′46″W	1177239	Bridge Number 438 (Belvidere Bridge) More images
British Waterways Board Canal Maintenance Depot, Shropshire Union Canal (South East Side) (Llangollen Branch)	Birch, Ellesmere Rural, Shropshire	Workshops	c. 1806	25 April 1988	SJ4005734227; 52°54′08″N 2°53′33″W	1366122	Upload Photo
British Waterways Board Canal Maintenance Depot, Shropshire Union Canal (south East Side) (Llangollen Branch) Timber Store (pine loft)	Birch, Ellesmere Rural, Shropshire	Steam Engine	c. 1806	25 April 1988	SJ4006634180; 52°54′06″N 2°53′33″W	1055924	Upload Photo
Brogyntyn Hall	Brogyntyn Park, Selattyn and Gobowen, Shropshire	Country House	Early 18th century	19 January 1952	SJ2792431138; 52°52′22″N 3°04′20″W	1367373	Brogyntyn Hall More images
Brook House	Ashford Carbonell, Shropshire	Timber Framed House	1677	12 November 1954	SO5249370645; 52°19′55″N 2°41′55″W	1383624	Upload Photo
Brook House	Middleton, Bitterley, Shropshire	Farmhouse	1974	15 March 1974	SO5413477600; 52°23′40″N 2°40′32″W	1383677	Upload Photo
Brookgate Farmhouse	Plealey, Pontesbury, Shropshire	Kitchen	14th century or 15th century	2 July 1971	SJ4250906913; 52°39′25″N 2°51′05″W	1366680	Upload Photo
Buntingsdale Hall	Sutton upon Tern, Shropshire	Country House	1721	14 February 1979	SJ6547532538; 52°53′21″N 2°30′52″W	1293695	Buntingsdale Hall More images
Burford House and Garden Wall attached to the South East	Burford, Shropshire	House	Early-mid 18th century	12 November 1954	SO5821567973; 52°18′30″N 2°36′51″W	1383418	Burford House and Garden Wall attached to the South East More images
Cantlop Bridge	Cantlop, Berrington, Shropshire	Bridge	1818	8 May 1972	SJ5173806244; 52°39′06″N 2°42′53″W	1366715	Cantlop Bridge More images
Castle Farmhouse including attached Outbuildings	Cheney Longville, Wistanstow, Shropshire	Farmhouse	14th century	12 November 1954	SO4172884776; 52°27′28″N 2°51′32″W	1269816	Castle Farmhouse including attached Outbuildings More images
Castle Gates House	Shrewsbury, Shropshire	House	Later	10 January 1953	SJ4941412763; 52°42′37″N 2°45′01″W	1246555	Castle Gates House More images
Castle Lodge and attached Railings	Ludlow, Shropshire	House	Late C16/Early 17th century	15 April 1954	SO5099074584; 52°22′02″N 2°43′16″W	1282027	Castle Lodge and attached Railings More images
Catherton Cottage	Hopton Wafers, Shropshire	House	Late 14th century or early 15th century	29 February 2000	SO6532678386; 52°24′09″N 2°30′40″W	1383536	Upload Photo
Chapel House	Dinham, Ludlow, Shropshire	House	1993	15 April 1954	SO5088574447; 52°21′57″N 2°43′22″W	1210446	Chapel House More images
Charlton Hill House	Charlton Hill, Wroxeter and Uppington, Shropshire	House	c. 1660	17 February 1985	SJ5879007368; 52°39′45″N 2°36′39″W	1267155	Upload Photo
Charlton House & Garden House & Ludford House & St Giles House	Ludford, Shropshire	House	16th century	15 November 1954	SO5126674084; 52°21′45″N 2°43′02″W	1291720	Charlton House & Garden House & Ludford House & St Giles House More images
Chatwall Hall	Chatwall, Cardington, Shropshire	Farmhouse	Mid 17th century	29 January 1952	SO5141997544; 52°34′25″N 2°43′06″W	1055617	Chatwall Hall More images
Chirk Aqueduct (that part in Weston Rhyn CP)	Shropshire Union Canal, Weston Rhyn, Shropshire	Aqueduct	1796–1801	2 September 1987	SJ2872437213; 52°55′39″N 3°03′42″W	1295150	Chirk Aqueduct (that part in Weston Rhyn CP) More images
Chirk Viaduct	Weston Rhyn, Shropshire	Railway Viaduct	1846-8	2 September 1987	SJ2869437205; 52°55′39″N 3°03′44″W	1295219	Chirk Viaduct More images
Church Farmhouse	Edgton, Shropshire	Farmhouse	Late 16th century	21 March 1968	SO3871085742; 52°27′58″N 2°54′13″W	1307992	Upload Photo
Church of All Saints	Baschurch, Shropshire	Parish Church	Late 12th century	27 May 1953	SJ4223721879; 52°47′29″N 2°51′29″W	1176049	Church of All Saints More images
Church of All Saints	Broseley, Shropshire	Church	1845	24 October 1950	SJ6789001534; 52°36′38″N 2°28′32″W	1053895	Church of All Saints More images
Church of All Saints	Clive, Shropshire	Parish Church	c. 1190	28 October 1960	SJ5147924028; 52°48′42″N 2°43′17″W	1055420	Church of All Saints More images
Church of All Saints	Culmington, Shropshire	Parish Church	Anglo Saxon	12 November 1954	SO4936181962; 52°26′00″N 2°44′47″W	1269907	Church of All Saints More images
Church of All Saints	Neen Sollars, Shropshire	Church	Late 13th century	12 November 1954	SO6600072274; 52°20′51″N 2°30′02″W	1383573	Church of All Saints More images
Church of All Saints	Norbury, Shropshire	Parish Church	Late 13th century	21 March 1968	SO3640492835; 52°31′47″N 2°56′20″W	1367199	Church of All Saints More images
Church of Holy Trinity	Bourton, Much Wenlock, Shropshire	Church	Early 18th century	24 October 1950	SO5971296359; 52°33′49″N 2°35′45″W	1189037	Church of Holy Trinity More images
Church of Holy Trinity	Sidbury, Shropshire	Church	1734	9 March 1970	SO6838385773; 52°28′08″N 2°28′01″W	1053776	Church of Holy Trinity More images
Church of Holy Trinity	Wheathill, Shropshire	Church	12th century	12 November 1954	SO6219582152; 52°26′10″N 2°33′27″W	1383755	Church of Holy Trinity More images
Church of Saint Chad	Montford, Shropshire	Parish Church	1735–1738	13 June 1958	SJ4188814776; 52°43′39″N 2°51′43″W	1055118	Church of Saint Chad More images
Church of Saint Chad and attached Archway	Norton in Hales, Shropshire	Tower	Late 14th century	5 June 1987	SJ7035538676; 52°56′41″N 2°26′33″W	1366459	Church of Saint Chad and attached Archway More images
Church of Saint John the Baptist	Ightfield, Shropshire	Parish Church	Late 15th century	1 March 1988	SJ5924438672; 52°56′38″N 2°36′29″W	1366502	Church of Saint John the Baptist More images
Church of Saint Margaret	Moreton Say, Shropshire	Tower	1769	10 February 1959	SJ6300334460; 52°54′23″N 2°33′05″W	1056059	Church of Saint Margaret More images
Church of Saint Martin	Little Ness, Shropshire	Chapel of Ease	Late 12th century	27 May 1953	SJ4075319893; 52°46′24″N 2°52′47″W	1055114	Church of Saint Martin More images
Church of Saint Martin	Preston Gubbals, Bomere Heath and District, Shropshire	Chapel of Ease	12th century	13 June 1958	SJ4918819613; 52°46′18″N 2°45′17″W	1175242	Church of Saint Martin More images
Church of Saint Mary	Market Drayton, Shropshire	Tower	14th century	7 May 1952	SJ6759234071; 52°54′11″N 2°29′00″W	1366835	Church of Saint Mary More images
Church of Saint Mary	Shrawardine, Montford, Shropshire	Church	1213	27 November 1987	SJ3994815278; 52°43′54″N 2°53′27″W	1366943	Church of Saint Mary More images
Church of Saint Peter and Saint Paul	Fitz, Bomere Heath and District, Shropshire	Parish Church	c. 1722	13 June 1958	SJ4487717840; 52°45′19″N 2°49′05″W	1366947	Church of Saint Peter and Saint Paul More images
Church of St Alkmund	Shrewsbury, Shropshire	Parish Church	15th century	10 January 1953	SJ4927112487; 52°42′28″N 2°45′08″W	1254774	Church of St Alkmund More images
Church of St Andrew	Ashford Bowdler, Shropshire	Church	12th century	12 November 1954	SO5194170553; 52°19′51″N 2°42′24″W	1383609	Church of St Andrew More images
Church of St Andrew	Quatt, Quatt Malvern, Shropshire	Church	12th century origins	9 March 1970	SO7562488206; 52°29′28″N 2°21′38″W	1367569	Church of St Andrew More images
Church of St Calixtus	Astley Abbotts, Shropshire	Church	1633	9 March 1970	SO7085896237; 52°33′47″N 2°25′53″W	1367834	Church of St Calixtus More images
Church of St Catherine	Tugford, Abdon, Shropshire	Church	12th century	12 November 1954	SO5571087060; 52°28′47″N 2°39′13″W	1383393	Church of St Catherine More images
Church of St Chad	Boningale, Shropshire	Church	1861	26 September 1984	SJ8116702601; 52°37′15″N 2°16′47″W	1053675	Church of St Chad More images
Church of St Chad	Prees, Shropshire	Parish Church	Late 14th century	28 October 1960	SJ5569833456; 52°53′48″N 2°39′36″W	1213100	Church of St Chad More images
Church of St Chad	Stockton, Shropshire	Church	Before 1651	1 February 1974	SO7292099658; 52°35′39″N 2°24′04″W	1053743	Church of St Chad More images
Church of St Cuthbert	Clungunford, Shropshire	Church	1776	21 March 1968	SO3948778733; 52°24′12″N 2°53′27″W	1367013	Church of St Cuthbert More images
Church of St Cuthbert	Donington, Shropshire	Parish Church	Early 14th century	26 September 1984	SJ8088304654; 52°38′21″N 2°17′02″W	1273838	Church of St Cuthbert More images
Church of St Edith	Church Pulverbatch, Shropshire	Parish Church	Medieval	13 June 1958	SJ4299202921; 52°37′16″N 2°50′37″W	1055078	Church of St Edith More images
Church of St George	Clun, Shropshire	Parish Church	12th century	21 March 1968	SO3004180554; 52°25′07″N 3°01′48″W	1367257	Church of St George More images
Church of St George	Milson, Shropshire	Church	12th century	12 November 1954	SO6395672819; 52°21′08″N 2°31′50″W	1383558	Church of St George More images
Church of St George	Pontesbury, Shropshire	Parish Church	Saxon	13 June 1958	SJ3997306086; 52°38′57″N 2°53′19″W	1055633	Church of St George More images
Church of St Giles	Chetton, Shropshire	Church	1788	9 March 1970	SO6639790368; 52°30′37″N 2°29′48″W	1188141	Church of St Giles More images
Church of St Giles	Ludford, Shropshire	Parish Church	11th century	15 November 1954	SO5128374114; 52°21′46″N 2°43′01″W	1291747	Church of St Giles More images
Church of St Giles	Shrewsbury, Shropshire	Church	Later	10 January 1953	SJ5073011841; 52°42′07″N 2°43′50″W	1254938	Church of St Giles More images
Church of St James	Greete, Shropshire	Church	12th century	12 November 1954	SO5772070876; 52°20′04″N 2°37′19″W	1383510	Church of St James More images
Church of St James	Shipton, Shropshire	Bell Tower	Later Medieval	9 March 1970	SO5618491855; 52°31′22″N 2°38′50″W	1367573	Church of St James More images
Church of St John	Willey, Barrow, Shropshire	Church	12th century	24 October 1950	SO6720999197; 52°35′22″N 2°29′08″W	1053169	Church of St John More images
Church of St John the Baptist	Bishop's Castle, Shropshire	Tower	Medieval	28 July 1950	SO3230088418; 52°29′22″N 2°59′55″W	1367186	Church of St John the Baptist More images
Church of St John the Baptist	Church Preen, Shropshire	Church	1220–50	13 June 1958	SO5433198148; 52°34′45″N 2°40′31″W	1366863	Church of St John the Baptist More images
Church of St John the Baptist	Stapleton, Condover, Shropshire	Parish Church	c. 1790	13 June 1958	SJ4707604502; 52°38′08″N 2°47′00″W	1176071	Church of St John the Baptist More images
Church of St John the Baptist	Ditton Priors, Shropshire	Church	13th century	9 March 1970	SO6082789168; 52°29′56″N 2°34′42″W	1053854	Church of St John the Baptist More images
Church of St John the Baptist	Kenley, Shropshire	Parish Church	17th century	13 June 1958	SJ5627900795; 52°36′11″N 2°38′49″W	1055258	Church of St John the Baptist More images
Church of St John the Baptist	Churchtown, Mainstone, Shropshire	Church	15th century	21 March 1968	SO2646387347; 52°28′45″N 3°05′03″W	1176459	Church of St John the Baptist More images
Church of St John the Baptist	Myndtown, Shropshire	Parish Church	12th century	21 March 1968	SO3903489542; 52°30′01″N 2°53′58″W	1054598	Church of St John the Baptist More images
Church of St John the Baptist	Nash	Church	Early 14th century	12 November 1954	SO6041871710; 52°20′31″N 2°34′57″W	1383565	Church of St John the Baptist More images
Church of St John the Evangelist	Colemere, Welshampton and Lyneal, Shropshire	Parish Church	1870	20 August 1971	SJ4377932908; 52°53′26″N 2°50′13″W	1055926	Church of St John the Evangelist More images
Church of St Julian	Shrewsbury, Shropshire	Tower	12th century	10 January 1953	SJ4928012438; 52°42′26″N 2°45′08″W	1247563	Church of St Julian More images
Church of St Lucia	Upton Magna, Shropshire	Parish Church	Early 12th century	13 June 1958	SJ5533912473; 52°42′29″N 2°39′45″W	1267600	Church of St Lucia More images
Church of St Margaret	Abdon, Shropshire	Church	14th century	12 November 1954	SO5753786605; 52°28′33″N 2°37′36″W	1383593	Church of St Margaret More images
Church of St Margaret	Acton Scott, Shropshire	Church	12th century	12 November 1954	SO4536889434; 52°30′00″N 2°48′22″W	1383212	Church of St Margaret More images
Church of St Margaret	Clee St. Margaret, Shropshire	Church	11th century	11 December 1954	SO5645084358; 52°27′20″N 2°38′32″W	1380326	Church of St Margaret More images
Church of St Mary	Alveley, Shropshire	Church	13th century	9 March 1970	SO7595884544; 52°27′30″N 2°21′19″W	1053191	Church of St Mary More images
Church of St Mary	Ashford Carbonel, Shropshire	Church	12th century	12 November 1954	SO5251271004; 52°20′06″N 2°41′54″W	1383628	Church of St Mary More images
Church of St Mary	Astley, Shropshire	Church	15th century or 16th century	13 June 1958	SJ5297518819; 52°45′54″N 2°41′54″W	1055176	Church of St Mary More images
Church of St Mary	Bedstone, Shropshire	Parish Church	12th century	21 March 1968	SO3688875745; 52°22′34″N 2°55′43″W	1055017	Church of St Mary More images
Church of St Mary	Bettws-y-Crwyn, Shropshire	Parish Church	Late 13th century or Early 14th century	21 March 1968	SO2058481364; 52°25′28″N 3°10′10″W	1367242	Church of St Mary More images
Church of St Mary	Billingsley, Shropshire	Church	12th century	9 March 1970	SO7041685387; 52°27′56″N 2°26′13″W	1053172	Church of St Mary More images
Church of St Mary	Bitterley, Shropshire	Church	12th century	12 November 1954	SO5708177314; 52°23′32″N 2°37′56″W	1383652	Church of St Mary More images
Church of St Mary	Caynham, Shropshire	Church	12th century	12 November 1954	SO5537473278; 52°21′21″N 2°39′24″W	1383694	Church of St Mary More images
Church of St Mary	Highley, Shropshire	Church	Early 12th century	9 March 1970	SO7411383270; 52°26′48″N 2°22′56″W	1188722	Church of St Mary More images
Church of St Mary	Hordley, Shropshire	Parish Church	Mid to late 12th century	27 May 1953	SJ3812330825; 52°52′17″N 2°55′15″W	1055883	Church of St Mary More images
Church of St Mary	Kinnerley, Shropshire	Church	Late 19th century	8 October 1959	SJ3382520943; 52°46′55″N 2°58′57″W	1054675	Church of St Mary More images
Church of St Mary	Knockin, Shropshire	Chapel of Ease	1182–1195	8 October 1959	SJ3340522339; 52°47′40″N 2°59′21″W	1054683	Church of St Mary More images
Church of St Mary	Leebotwood, Shropshire	Parish Church	13th century	13 June 1958	SO4706198673; 52°35′00″N 2°46′58″W	1177258	Church of St Mary More images
Church of St Mary	Leighton, Leighton and Eaton Constantine, Shropshire	Parish Church	Medieval	13 June 1958	SJ6128105144; 52°38′34″N 2°34′25″W	1055265	Church of St Mary More images
Church of St Mary	Neen Savage, Shropshire	Church	12th century	9 March 1970	SO6743777333; 52°23′35″N 2°28′48″W	1053802	Church of St Mary More images
Church of St Mary	Sheriffhales, Shropshire	Parish Church	12th century	26 May 1955	SJ7580212032; 52°42′19″N 2°21′34″W	1053645	Church of St Mary More images
Church of St Mary	Sutton Maddock, Shropshire	Church	1887–1888	1 February 1974	SJ7188901390; 52°36′34″N 2°25′00″W	1367564	Church of St Mary More images
Church of St Mary	Westbury, Shropshire	Parish Church	13th century	13 June 1958	SJ3554509428; 52°40′43″N 2°57′17″W	1366907	Church of St Mary More images
Church of St Mary and St Andrew	Condover, Shropshire	Parish Church	12th century	13 June 1958	SJ4946905782; 52°38′51″N 2°44′54″W	1366672	Church of St Mary and St Andrew More images
Church of St Mary Magdalene	Albrighton, Shropshire	Boiler House	C20	26 September 1984	SJ8093904427; 52°38′14″N 2°16′59″W	1053700	Church of St Mary Magdalene More images
Church of St Mary Magdalene	Bridgnorth, Shropshire	Church	1792	18 July 1949	SO7169692820; 52°31′57″N 2°25′07″W	1177357	Church of St Mary Magdalene More images
Church of St Mary Magdalene	Quatford, Bridgnorth, Shropshire	Church	1714	9 March 1970	SO7387590705; 52°30′49″N 2°23′11″W	1374848	Church of St Mary Magdalene More images
Church of St Mary Magdalene	Hadnall, Shropshire	Church	c. 1840	29 October 1986	SJ5220520054; 52°46′33″N 2°42′36″W	1177680	Church of St Mary Magdalene More images
Church of St Mary Magdalene	Battlefield, Shrewsbury, Shropshire	Church	Early 15th century	19 September 1972	SJ5125217255; 52°45′03″N 2°43′25″W	1246192	Church of St Mary Magdalene More images
Church of St Mary the Virgin	Whitton, Shropshire	Church	12th century	12 November 1954	SO5758772860; 52°21′08″N 2°37′27″W	1383589	Church of St Mary the Virgin More images
Church of St Michael	Aston Botterell, Shropshire	Church	12th century	9 March 1970	SO6325484114; 52°27′13″N 2°32′32″W	1053203	Church of St Michael More images
Church of St Michael	Child's Ercall, Shropshire	Parish Church	13th century	25 February 1987	SJ6655925087; 52°49′20″N 2°29′52″W	1176104	Church of St Michael More images
Church of St Michael	Hopton Wafers, Shropshire	Church	1827	12 November 1954	SO6373476544; 52°23′09″N 2°32′03″W	1383537	Church of St Michael More images
Church of St Michael	Onibury, Shropshire	Church	Norman	12 November 1954	SO4557879158; 52°24′28″N 2°48′05″W	1269840	Church of St Michael More images
Church of St Michael	Stowe, Shropshire	Parish Church	Mid 13th century	21 March 1968	SO3100673697; 52°21′25″N 3°00′52″W	1176468	Church of St Michael More images
Church of St Michael	Wentnor, Shropshire	Parish Church	Medieval	21 March 1968	SO3836492657; 52°31′42″N 2°54′36″W	1054608	Church of St Michael More images
Church of St Michael	West Felton, Shropshire	Parish Church	Early 12th century	8 October 1959	SJ3411425225; 52°49′14″N 2°58′45″W	1367365	Church of St Michael More images
Church of St Michael	Silvington, Wheathill, Shropshire	Church	12th century	12 November 1954	SO6210779852; 52°24′55″N 2°33′31″W	1383760	Church of St Michael More images
Church of St Michael and All Angels	Alberbury, Alberbury with Cardeston, Shropshire	Collegiate Church	Late 12th century	13 June 1958	SJ3586214443; 52°43′26″N 2°57′04″W	1055242	Church of St Michael and All Angels More images
Church of St Michael and All Angels	Stanton Long, Shropshire	Parish Church	13th century	9 March 1970	SO5716190716; 52°30′45″N 2°37′58″W	1367577	Church of St Michael and All Angels More images
Church of St Michael and All Angels	Woolstaston, Shropshire	Parish Church	Late 12th century or early 13th century	7 April 1986	SO4522398473; 52°34′53″N 2°48′35″W	1366699	Church of St Michael and All Angels More images
Church of St Milburga	Beckbury, Shropshire	Parish Church	13th century	26 September 1984	SJ7651101558; 52°36′41″N 2°20′54″W	1367602	Church of St Milburga More images
Church of St Milburga	Stoke St. Milborough, Shropshire	Church	13th century	12 November 1954	SO5663482290; 52°26′13″N 2°38′22″W	1383737	Church of St Milburga More images
Church of St Oswald	Oswestry, Shropshire	Parish Church	Medieval	10 September 1951	SJ2886929368; 52°51′26″N 3°03′28″W	1054332	Church of St Oswald More images
Church of St Peter	Coreley, Shropshire	Church	13th century	12 November 1954	SO6131973994; 52°21′45″N 2°34′10″W	1383711	Church of St Peter More images
Church of St Peter	Diddlebury, Shropshire	Parish Church	Saxon	12 November 1954	SO5084385372; 52°27′51″N 2°43′30″W	1269882	Church of St Peter More images
Church of St Peter	Monkhopton, Shropshire	Church	12th century	9 March 1970	SO6256293424; 52°32′15″N 2°33′12″W	1367522	Church of St Peter More images
Church of St Peter	More, Shropshire	Parish Church	Early 13th century	2 March 1968	SO3429691524; 52°31′03″N 2°58′11″W	1054594	Church of St Peter More images
Church of St Peter	Moreton Corbet and Lee Brockhurst, Shropshire	Parish Church	Mid 12th century	16 September 1987	SJ5461327173; 52°50′25″N 2°40′31″W	1366483	Church of St Peter More images
Church of St Peter	Rushbury, Shropshire	Church	Saxon	12 November 1954	SO5136991848; 52°31′20″N 2°43′05″W	1383373	Church of St Peter More images
Church of St Peter	Worfield, Shropshire	Church	14th century	9 March 1970	SO7580695804; 52°33′34″N 2°21′30″W	1293886	Church of St Peter More images
Church of St Peter and St Paul	Cleobury North, Shropshire	Church	Late 12th century	9 March 1970	SO6232087002; 52°28′47″N 2°33′22″W	1053891	Church of St Peter and St Paul More images
Church of St Peter and St Paul	Sheinton, Shropshire	Parish Church	Medieval	13 June 1958	SJ6105803982; 52°37′56″N 2°34′37″W	1175850	Church of St Peter and St Paul More images
Church of St Peter and St Paul	Wem Urban, Shropshire	Church	Circa 14th century	28 August 1951	SJ5123528864; 52°51′18″N 2°43′32″W	1366758	Church of St Peter and St Paul More images
Church of St Swithun	Cheswardine, Shropshire	Parish Church	13th century	10 February 1959	SJ7192929907; 52°51′57″N 2°25′06″W	1055352	Church of St Swithun More images
Church of St. Leonard	Bridgnorth, Shropshire	Church	1448	18 July 1949	SO7169393342; 52°32′14″N 2°25′08″W	1178124	Church of St. Leonard More images
Church of the Holy Trinity	Lydham, Shropshire	Parish Church	13th century	21 March 1968	SO3356391065; 52°30′48″N 2°58′49″W	1054512	Church of the Holy Trinity More images
Church of the Holy Trinity	Minsterley, Shropshire	Parish Church	1689	13 June 1958	SJ3739405062; 52°38′23″N 2°55′36″W	1055228	Church of the Holy Trinity More images
Church of the Holy Trinity	Wistanstow, Shropshire	Parish Church	12th century	12 November 1954	SO4322485591; 52°27′55″N 2°50′14″W	1269808	Church of the Holy Trinity More images
Church of the Holy Trinity	Uppington, Wroxeter and Uppington, Shropshire	Parish Church	Late 11th century or 12th century	13 June 1958	SJ5973709368; 52°40′50″N 2°35′49″W	1273575	Church of the Holy Trinity More images
Churchyard Cross about 10m south of the Tower of the Church of St Cuthbert	Donington, Shropshire	Cross/Sundial	1984	26 September 1984	SJ8087404639; 52°38′21″N 2°17′03″W	1239196	Churchyard Cross about 10m south of the Tower of the Church of St Cuthbert More images
Churchyard Cross about 5m south-east of the Chancel of the Church of St Giles	Badger, Shropshire	Cross	14th century or 15th century	26 September 1984	SO7682899616; 52°35′38″N 2°20′37″W	1221769	Churchyard Cross about 5m south-east of the Chancel of the Church of St Giles More images
Churchyard Cross about 5m south of the South Porch of the Church of St Mary Magdalene	Albrighton, Shropshire	Cross/Sundial	Late 19th century	26 September 1984	SJ8093104408; 52°38′13″N 2°17′00″W	1275163	Churchyard Cross about 5m south of the South Porch of the Church of St Mary Magdalene
Churchyard Cross about 5m to south of South Chapel of Church of St Michael and All Angels	Alberbury with Cardeston, Shropshire	Cross/Sundial	1958	13 June 1958	SJ3585714427; 52°43′25″N 2°57′04″W	1175214	Upload Photo
Churchyard Cross Base and Sundial about 5m to south of South Chapel of Church of St Bartholomew	Tong, Shropshire	Cross/Sundial	1776	29 August 1984	SJ7956807365; 52°39′49″N 2°18′13″W	1176556	Churchyard Cross Base and Sundial about 5m to south of South Chapel of Church of St Bartholomew More images
Churchyard Cross in Churchyard of St Mary	Caynham, Shropshire	Cross	Medieval	12 November 1954	SO5538673265; 52°21′20″N 2°39′23″W	1383696	Churchyard Cross in Churchyard of St Mary More images
Churchyard Farmhouse	Neenton, Shropshire	House	16th century	1 February 1974	SO6371287696; 52°29′09″N 2°32′09″W	1053803	Churchyard Farmhouse
Cleeton Court	Bitterley, Shropshire	Farmhouse	15th century	15 March 1974	SO6061279474; 52°24′43″N 2°34′50″W	1383664	Upload Photo
Clive House and adjacent Dwelling	Shrewsbury, Shropshire	House	1752	10 January 1953	SJ4912012343; 52°42′23″N 2°45′16″W	1271068	Upload Photo
Cloverley Hall and Stable Yards	Calverhall, Ightfield, Shropshire	Country House	1764–70	20 August 1971	SJ6152837081; 52°55′47″N 2°34′26″W	1366479	Cloverley Hall and Stable Yards More images
Clun Bridge	Clun, Shropshire	Bridge	16th century	1 December 1951	SO3003180769; 52°25′14″N 3°01′49″W	1054499	Clun Bridge More images
Clun Museum	Clun, Shropshire	Market House	1780	1 December 1951	SO3007680876; 52°25′17″N 3°01′47″W	1054426	Clun Museum More images
Coalport Bridge	Coalport, Broseley, Shropshire	Road Bridge	1818	26 March 1968	SJ7017902082; 52°36′56″N 2°26′31″W	1206658	Coalport Bridge More images
Colehurst Manor	Sutton, Sutton upon Tern, Shropshire	Farmhouse	c. 1600	25 February 1987	SJ6611331340; 52°52′42″N 2°30′18″W	1190654	Upload Photo
Corfton House	Corfton, Diddlebury, Shropshire	House	18th century	12 November 1954	SO4981184777; 52°27′31″N 2°44′24″W	1269899	Upload Photo
Cotton's House	Market Drayton, Shropshire	House	c. 1600	2 October 1975	SJ6739733992; 52°54′09″N 2°29′10″W	1176974	Cotton's House
Council House Cottage	Shrewsbury, Shropshire	House	C15-C17	10 January 1953	SJ4944112698; 52°42′34″N 2°44′59″W	1247156	Upload Photo
Cound Arbour Bridge	Cound, Shropshire	Bridge	18th century	8 May 1972	SJ5552805245; 52°38′35″N 2°39′31″W	1177597	Cound Arbour Bridge More images
Court of Hill	Nash	Manor House	Medieval	12 November 1954	SO6014972975; 52°21′12″N 2°35′11″W	1383566	Upload Photo
Crowleasowes	Middleton, Bitterley, Shropshire	Farmhouse	Earlier core	12 November 1954	SO5469778357; 52°24′05″N 2°40′02″W	1383684	Upload Photo
Cruck Barn about 20m north-east of Binweston Farmhouse	Binweston, Worthen with Shelve, Shropshire	Cow House	C20	14 November 1986	SJ3017504108; 52°37′49″N 3°01′59″W	1055038	Upload Photo
Cruckmeole Old Hall	Cruckmeole, Pontesbury, Shropshire	House	Late 16th century	29 January 1952	SJ4301909563; 52°40′51″N 2°50′39″W	1055662	Upload Photo
Detton Hall	Neen Savage, Shropshire	Farmhouse	c. 1600	9 March 1970	SO6672279574; 52°24′47″N 2°29′26″W	1053799	Upload Photo
Dinham House	Ludlow, Shropshire	House	Early 18th century	15 April 1954	SO5085274494; 52°21′59″N 2°43′24″W	1210491	Dinham House More images
Dinham Lodge	Ludlow, Shropshire	House	Late 18th century	15 April 1954	SO5085274459; 52°21′57″N 2°43′24″W	1202915	Dinham Lodge More images
Dinthill Hall	Bicton, Shropshire	Country House	Mid-late 18th century	29 January 1952	SJ4283012715; 52°42′33″N 2°50′51″W	1295699	Dinthill Hall More images
Disused Windmill	Hawkstone Park, Weston-under-Redcastle, Shropshire	Windmill	Late 18th century	16 September 1987	SJ5665229724; 52°51′48″N 2°38′43″W	1264219	Disused Windmill More images
Dovecote about 15m east of Chirbury Hall	Chirbury, Chirbury with Brompton, Shropshire	Dovecote	17th century	14 November 1986	SO2618898593; 52°34′48″N 3°05′27″W	1366950	Upload Photo
Dovecote about 60m west of Lea Hall	Bomere Heath and District, Shropshire	Dovecote	c. 1584	29 January 1952	SJ4922421040; 52°47′04″N 2°45′15″W	1366924	Upload Photo
Dovecote about 95m north-west of Garden Cottage	Hodnet Park, Hodnet, Shropshire	Dovecote	1656	10 February 1986	SJ6092828184; 52°50′59″N 2°34′54″W	1055342	Dovecote about 95m north-west of Garden Cottage More images
Dovecote to north of Shipton Hall	Shipton, Shropshire	Dovecote	Saxon	9 March 1970	SO5621291993; 52°31′27″N 2°38′49″W	1053773	Dovecote to north of Shipton Hall More images
Dower House	Quatt, Quatt Malvern, Shropshire	House	Queen Anne	9 March 1970	SO7559588250; 52°29′30″N 2°21′39″W	1053767	Dower House More images
Downton Farmhouse	Downton, Upton Magna, Shropshire	Farmhouse	Late 16th century	17 February 1985	SJ5430412878; 52°42′42″N 2°40′40″W	1267697	Downton Farmhouse
Downton Hall and attached Balustrade	Stanton Lacy, Shropshire	House	Mid 18th century	12 November 1954	SO5280779274; 52°24′34″N 2°41′43″W	1269833	Downton Hall and attached Balustrade More images
Drapers Hall and attached raised Pavement and Railings	Shrewsbury, Shropshire	House	Early C20	10 January 1953	SJ4932512547; 52°42′30″N 2°45′05″W	1058993	Drapers Hall and attached raised Pavement and Railings More images
Dudmaston Hall	Quatt Malvern, Shropshire	Country House	Queen Anne	9 March 1970	SO7461888800; 52°29′47″N 2°22′31″W	1053806	Dudmaston Hall More images
Dunval	Astley Abbotts, Shropshire	Farmhouse	Elizabethan	9 March 1970	SO7007796042; 52°33′41″N 2°26′34″W	1053199	Upload Photo
Eardington House and Outbuildings adjoining	Eardington, Shropshire	House	18th century	9 March 1970	SO7219090594; 52°30′45″N 2°24′40″W	1188629	Eardington House and Outbuildings adjoining
East Farmhouse	Crickheath, Oswestry Rural, Shropshire	Farmhouse	Early 17th century	15 May 1986	SJ2919422947; 52°47′58″N 3°03′06″W	1177212	East Farmhouse More images
Elsich Manor	Corfton, Diddlebury, Shropshire	Manor House	16th century and later	12 November 1954	SO4916884029; 52°27′07″N 2°44′58″W	1269900	Upload Photo
English Bridge at SJ 496 123	Shrewsbury, Shropshire	Bridge	1769	10 January 1953	SJ4958312362; 52°42′24″N 2°44′51″W	1271479	English Bridge at SJ 496 123 More images
Entrance Screen and East and West Front Lodges to Attingham Park	Atcham, Shropshire	Gate	1805–1807	29 January 1952	SJ5418009353; 52°40′48″N 2°40′45″W	1176543	Entrance Screen and East and West Front Lodges to Attingham Park More images
Estate Bridge about 120m to south-east of Attingham Park	Attingham Park, Atcham, Shropshire	Bridge	1780	17 February 1985	SJ5515209897; 52°41′06″N 2°39′54″W	1055096	Estate Bridge about 120m to south-east of Attingham Park More images
Eudon George	Eudon George, Chetton, Shropshire	Farmhouse	17th century	9 March 1970	SO6877888933; 52°29′51″N 2°27′41″W	1053910	Upload Photo
Ewdness Manor House	Worfield, Shropshire	Farmhouse	Tudor	29 November 1951	SO7313098193; 52°34′51″N 2°23′53″W	1053718	Ewdness Manor House More images
Fitz Manor	Fitz, Bomere Heath and District, Shropshire	House	16th century	27 November 1987	SJ4492617854; 52°45′20″N 2°49′03″W	1055131	Upload Photo
Fives Court to North West of Bowling Green House	Ludford, Shropshire	Fives Court	17th century	12 November 1954	SO5049074279; 52°21′52″N 2°43′43″W	1202842	Upload Photo
Ford House	Ford, Snropshire	House	c. 1730	29 January 1952	SJ4127213886; 52°43′10″N 2°52′15″W	1308164	Ford House More images
Foresters House	Upper Millichope, Munslow, Shropshire	House	c. 1280	12 November 1954	SO5209889304; 52°29′58″N 2°42′25″W	1383368	Upload Photo
Former Church of St Bartholomew	Benthall, Barrow, Shropshire	Church	1667–68	24 October 1950	SJ6578302563; 52°37′11″N 2°30′25″W	1053209	Former Church of St Bartholomew More images
Former Church of St John	Sutton, Shrewsbury, Shropshire	Chapel	13th century	30 May 1969	SJ5026010472; 52°41′23″N 2°44′14″W	1270749	Upload Photo
Former Hunting Lodge about 600m to north-west of Park Lodge	Loton Deer Park, Alberbury with Cardeston, Shropshire	Hunting Lodge	c. 1675	18 March 1986	SJ3575213303; 52°42′49″N 2°57′09″W	1175673	Upload Photo
Former Office Range, Corner Pavilions, Gatehouse and Enclosing Walls to Outer Service Courtyard adjoining Attingham Park to North-west	Attingham Park, Atcham, Shropshire	Kennels	1783–1785	29 January 1952	SJ5493909955; 52°41′07″N 2°40′05″W	1366931	Former Office Range, Corner Pavilions, Gatehouse and Enclosing Walls to Outer Service Courtyard adjoining Attingham Park to North-west
Frodesley Lodge	Frodesley, Shropshire	House	17th century	29 January 1952	SO5182799842; 52°35′39″N 2°43′17″W	1055529	Frodesley Lodge More images
Gamehouse or Ash House about 25m north-east of Shelvock Farmhouse	Ruyton-XI-Towns, Shropshire	Game Larder	Mid-Late 17th century	21 August 1986	SJ3710124059; 52°48′37″N 2°56′05″W	1177462	Upload Photo
Garden House 120m north-west of Burford House	Burford, Shropshire	Garden House	1728	12 November 1954	SO5813868058; 52°18′33″N 2°36′56″W	1383419	Garden House 120m north-west of Burford House More images
Gaskell Arms Hotel	Much Wenlock, Shropshire	Hall House	Regency	24 October 1950	SO6210599767; 52°35′40″N 2°33′39″W	1053821	Gaskell Arms Hotel More images
Gatehouse about 10m north-east of Langley Hall Farmhouse	Langley, Ruckley and Langley, Shropshire	Gatehouse	15th century	13 June 1958	SJ5399900202; 52°35′52″N 2°40′50″W	1039985	Gatehouse about 10m north-east of Langley Hall Farmhouse More images
Gateway and adjoining walls at Condover Hall	Condover	Gate	19th century	10 March 1986	SJ4963205710; 52°38′48″N 2°44′45″W	1055707	Gateway and adjoining walls at Condover Hall More images
Gazebo about 65m to east of Harnage Granage	Cound, Shropshire	Gazebo	Late 16th century	14 May 1986	SJ5701902199; 52°36′57″N 2°38′11″W	1177293	Upload Photo
Gazebo in Garden of No 5, Brand Lane (House not included)	Ludlow, Shropshire	Gazebo	18th century	15 April 1954	SO5124974462; 52°21′58″N 2°43′03″W	1219113	Upload Photo
Golding	Golding, Cound, Shropshire	Farmhouse	Mid to late 18th century	29 January 1952	SJ5437103444; 52°37′37″N 2°40′32″W	1177600	Upload Photo
Governor's House	Bridgnorth, Shropshire	House	c. 1630	18 July 1949	SO7170892914; 52°32′00″N 2°25′07″W	1053993	Governor's House More images
Grammar School House	Bridgnorth, Shropshire	House	1625	18 July 1949	SO7171493286; 52°32′12″N 2°25′06″W	1053955	Grammar School House More images
Grange Farm House	Eardington, Shropshire	Farmhouse	18th century	9 March 1970	SO7234790347; 52°30′37″N 2°24′32″W	1294663	Upload Photo
Great Oxenbold	Monkhampton, Monkhopton, Shropshire	Farmhouse	Medieval	9 March 1970	SO5934091962; 52°31′26″N 2°36′03″W	1053835	Upload Photo
Greete Court	Greete, Shropshire	Farmhouse	16th century	15 March 1974	SO5775670847; 52°20′03″N 2°37′17″W	1383517	Greete Court More images
Guildhall	Much Wenlock, Shropshire	Gate	19th century	24 October 1950	SO6235599955; 52°35′46″N 2°33′26″W	1053794	Guildhall More images
Church of the Holy Trinity	Calverhall	Church	19th century	20 August 1971	SJ6032037237; 52°55′52″N 2°35′30″W	1056028	Church of the Holy Trinity More images

== See also ==
- Grade I listed buildings in Shropshire
