= Wheathill, Shropshire =

Village in Shropshire, England

Coordinates: 52.434993°N 2.5580005°W

Wheathill
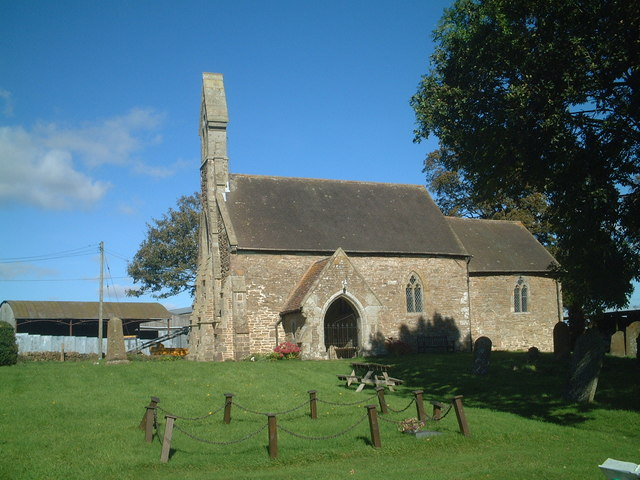

- Location within Shropshire
- Area: 12.00 km^{2} (4.63 sq mi)
- Population: 229 (2011 census)
  - Density: 19/km^{2} (49/sq mi)
- Civil parish: Wheathill
- Unitary authority: Shropshire
- Ceremonial county: Shropshire
- Region: West Midlands
- Country: England
- Sovereign state: United Kingdom
- Police: West Mercia
- Fire: Shropshire
- Ambulance: West Midlands
- Website: http://wheathillparishcouncil.org.uk/

Wheathill is a village and civil parish 21 miles (34 km) south east of Shrewsbury, in the Shropshire district, in the ceremonial county of Shropshire, England. The parish includes the villages of Loughton and Silvington, the hamlet of Bromdon and the deserted village of Egerton. In 2011 the parish had a population of 229. The parish touches Aston Botterell, Bitterley, Burwarton, Clee St. Margaret, Farlow, Hopton Wafers and Stoke St. Milborough.

== Landmarks ==
There are 14 listed buildings in Wheathill. Wheathill has a church called Holy Trinity.

== History ==
The name Whethill means 'Wheat hill' and was recorded in the Domesday Book as Waltham. The family of Whethill were for centuries the Lords of the manor here. In 1380 John Whethill of Whethill was Lord. Presumably it was his son or grandson, Sir Richard Whethill, Knt., (1410-1485) who was a rich merchant of the Staple at Calais in the middle of the 15th century.

On 1 April 1967 Loughton and Silvington parishes were merged with Wheathill.
