= Belvidere Bridge =

Historic bridge in Shrewsbury

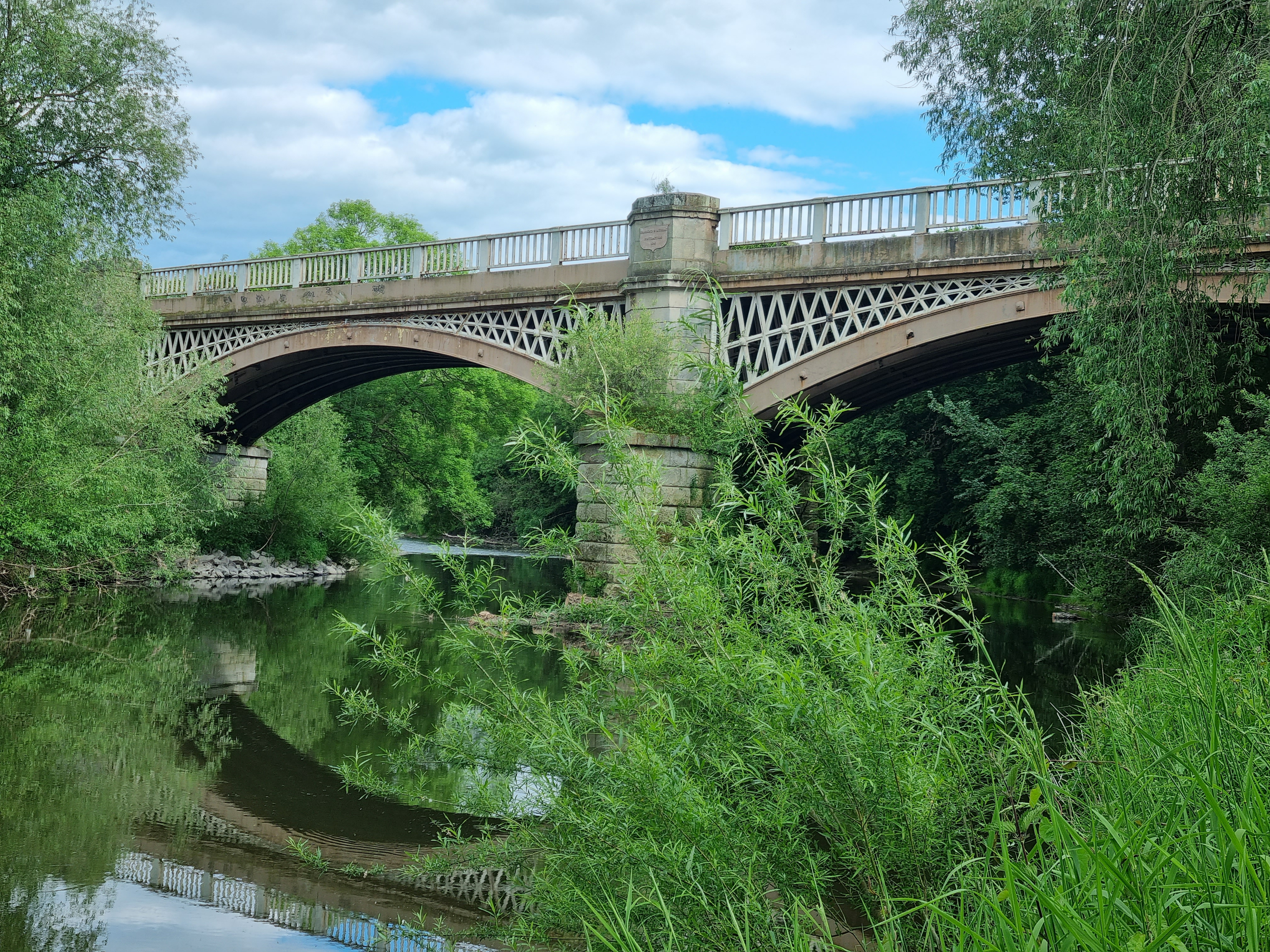
- Coordinates: 52.7083°N 2.7128°W
- Carries: Wolverhampton–Shrewsbury line
- Crosses: River Severn
- Locale: Shrewsbury, England
- Maintained by: Network Rail
- Heritage status: Grade II* listed building

Characteristics
- Material: Cast iron
- No. of spans: 2
- Piers in water: 1

History
- Constructed by: William Baker
- Opened: 1849

Belvidere Bridge (also spelt Belvedere Bridge) is a cast iron arch railway bridge in Shrewsbury, western England, built for the Shrewsbury and Birmingham Railway in 1849. It carries the modern Wolverhampton to Shrewsbury railway line over the River Severn and is a grade II* listed building.

== Background ==
The Shrewsbury and Birmingham Railway (SBR) opened from Shrewsbury as far as Oakengates on 1 June 1849, and then to Birmingham on 12 November 1849. The Belvidere Bridge crosses the River Severn between the Belvidere area of Shrewsbury and the village of Uffington, just east of Shrewsbury town centre.

== Design ==
The bridge is built in cast iron and consists of two skew arches with a 13 ft (4.0 m) central pier in the water. The pier and abutments are in dressed grey sandstone and retaining walls on the river banks are in engineering brick. Each arch is made up of six segments (or ribs), which were pre-cast at the iron foundry in nearby Coalbrookdale and bolted together. Each has a span of 101 ft 6 in (31 m) and a relatively low rise of 10 ft 8 in (3.25 m) above the river, giving it an unusually high span-to-rise ratio. The spandrels are filled with decorative diamond-shaped latticework. An original cast-iron parapet was replaced in the 20th century with steel railings in keeping with the original.

The central stone pier has a shield on each side. One the south side, the shield bears the name of William Baker, the engineer, and on the north side are the names of Hammond and Murray, the contractors. The metalwork on an outer rib on the south side contains the lettering "Coalbrookdale Foundry 1848". The bridge was originally number 4 on the SBR and is now number 438.

== History ==
The bridge was built in 1848 by Hammond and Murray and designed by Baker, the SBR's resident engineer. The contract for its construction, valued at £80,000, was let separately from the rest of the line. The bridge opened in 1849, with the rest of the line. Restoration work was carried out in the 1940s, and the central pier was given protection from scour. In 1984, the cast-iron bridge deck was replaced with reinforced concrete. The bridge is approved to carry trains with a maximum axle load of 25 tons. It has been a grade II* listed building since 1985.

Belvidere Bridge is one of four on the River Severn made of cast iron from the Coalbrookdale foundry. The first was the Iron Bridge (the world's first major cast-iron bridge) in Coalbrookdale itself. The other three are all railway bridges, of which Belvidere was the earliest. It was followed by two largely identical bridges, the Victoria Bridge near Upper Arley (1862), and the Albert Edward Bridge (1864) near Coalbrookdale.

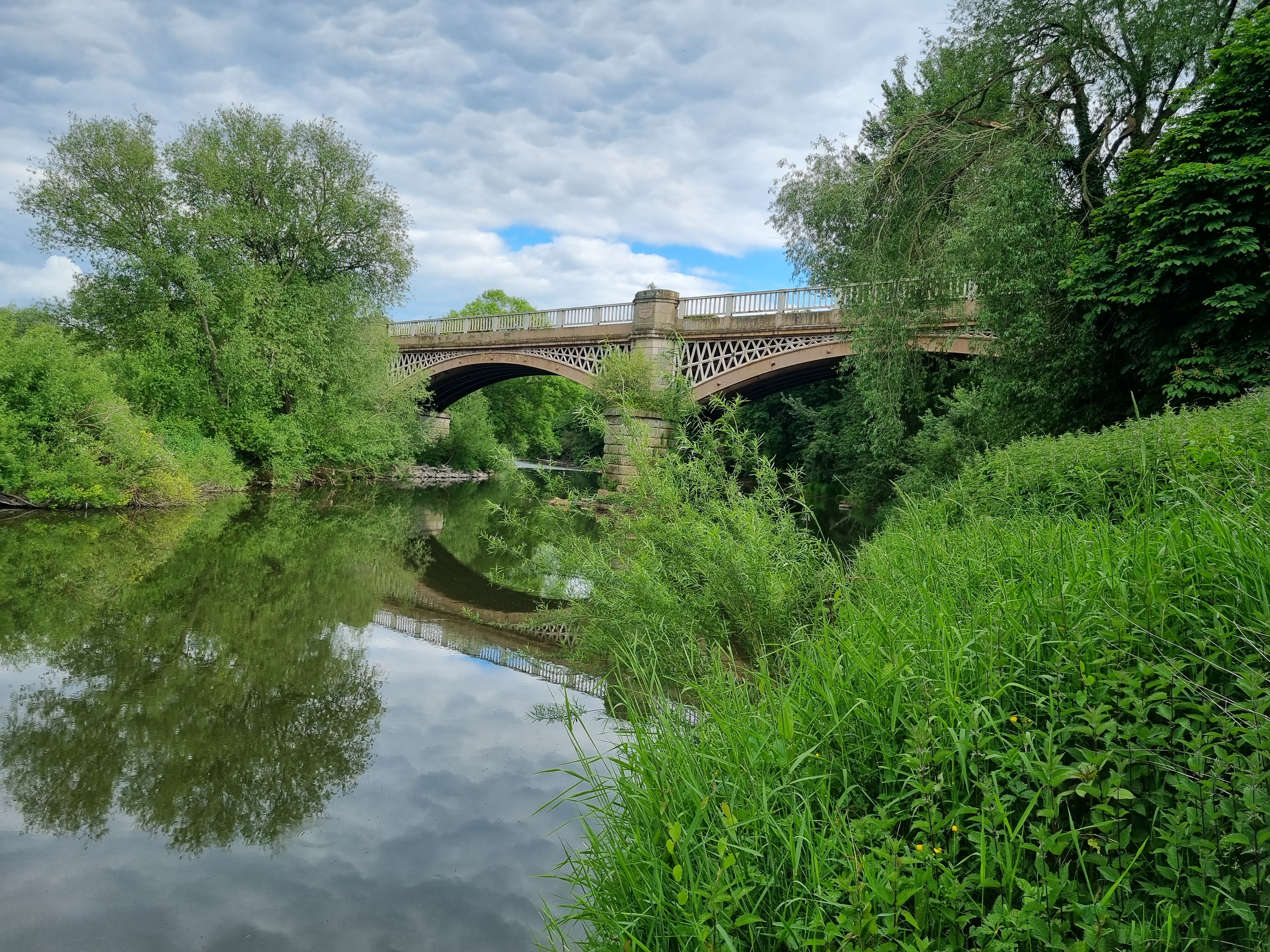
The bridge viewed from downstream

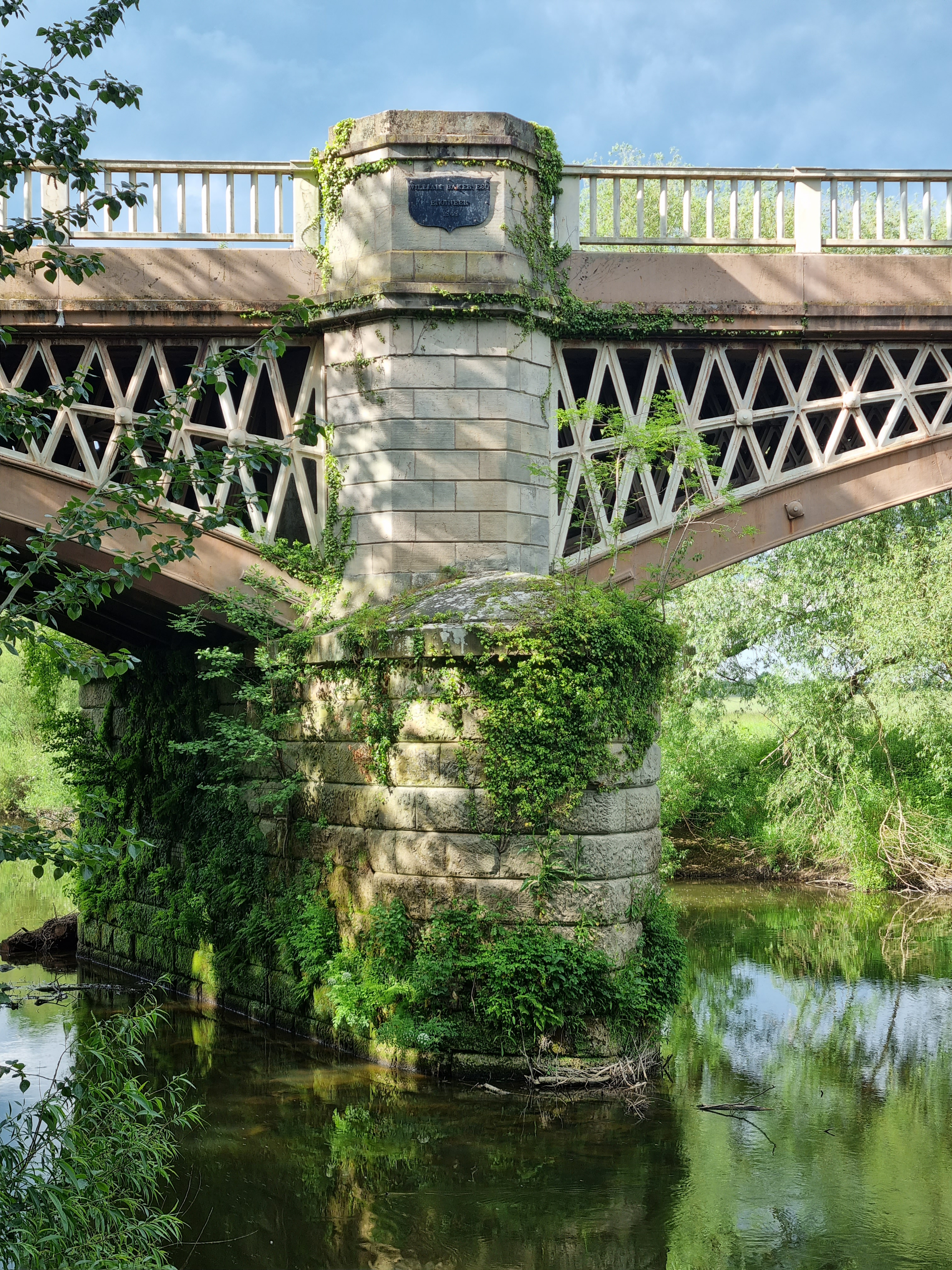
The central pier, showing the spandrels and the plaque with Baker's name

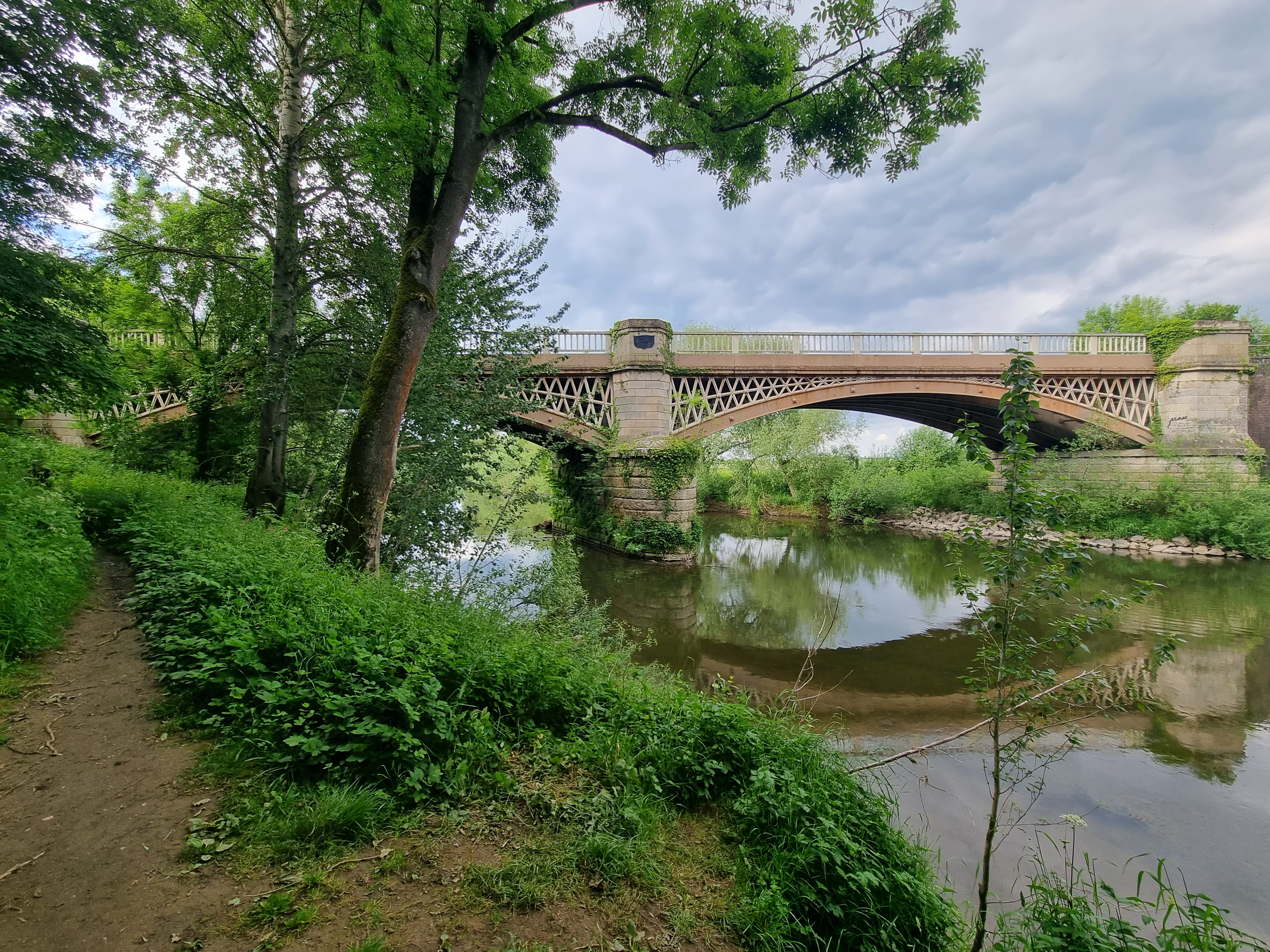
The bridge viewed from upstream

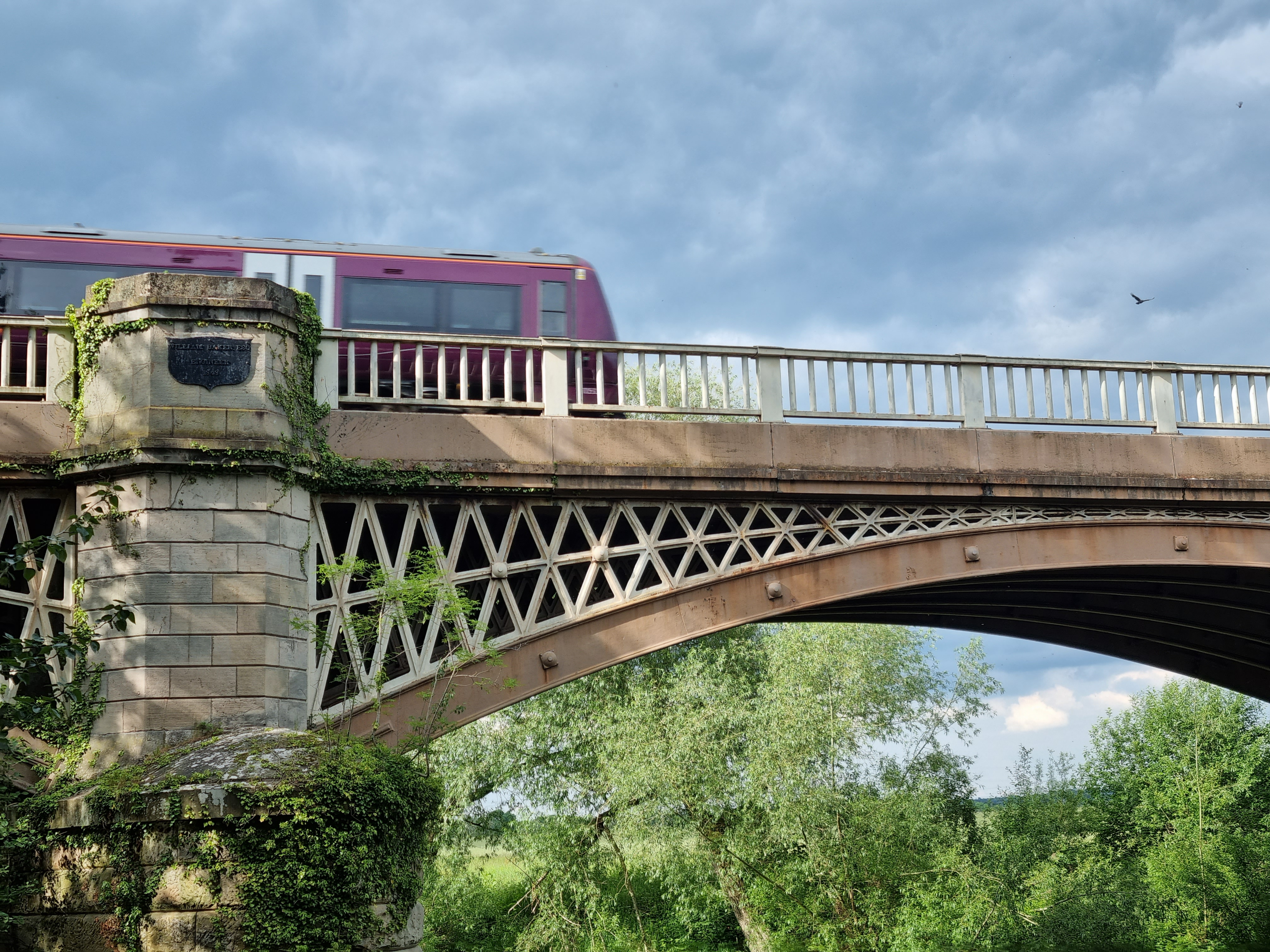
A train crossing the bridge

== See also ==
- List of crossings of the River Severn
- Listed buildings in Shrewsbury (outer areas)
- Grade II* listed buildings in Shropshire Council (A–G)
- List of railway bridges and viaducts in the United Kingdom
