= William Baker (engineer) =

English railway engineer (1817–1878)

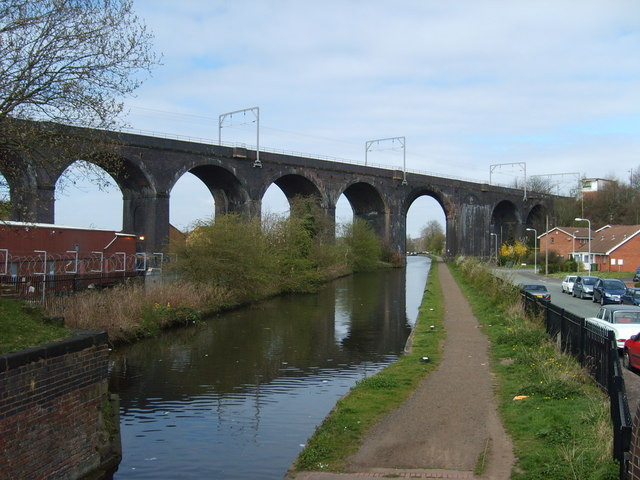
Oxley Viaduct 1847-49

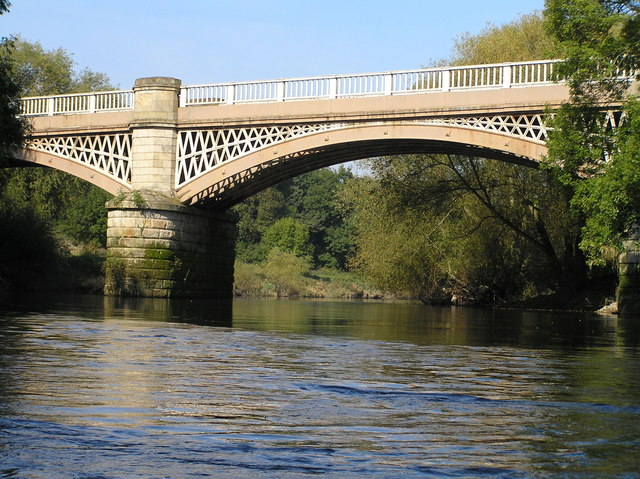
Belvidere railway bridge 1848

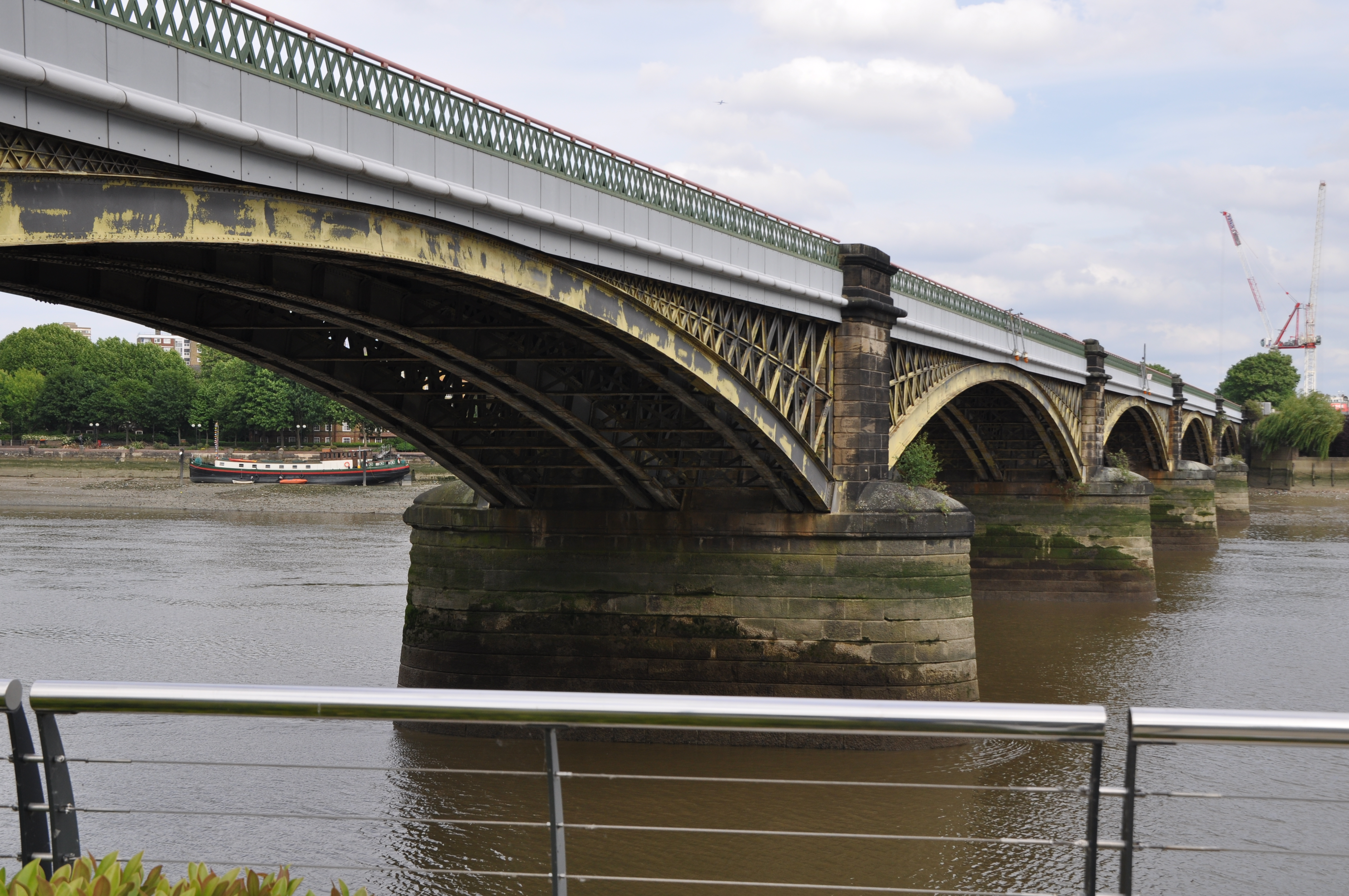
Battersea Railway Bridge 1863

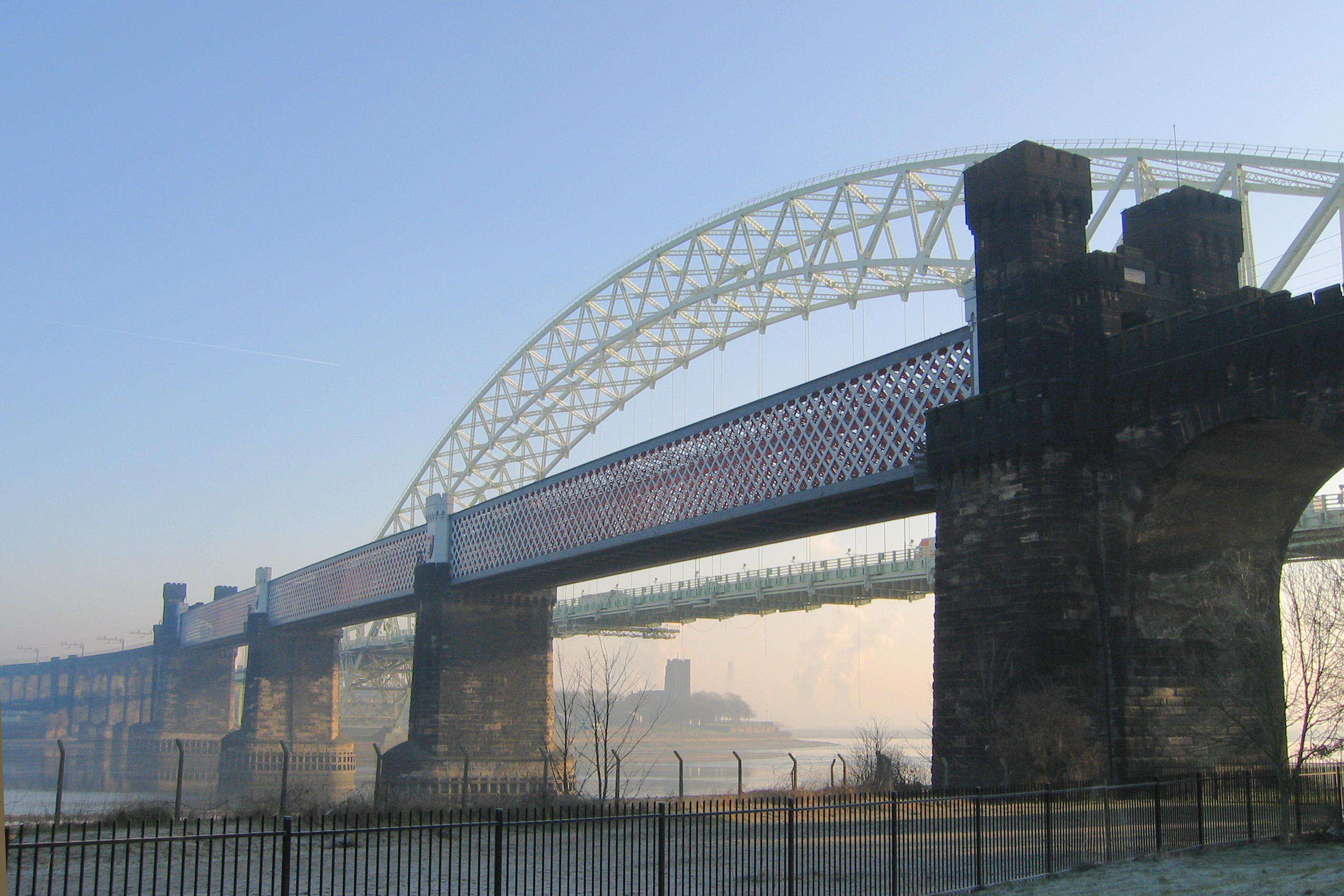
Runcorn Railway Bridge 1868

William Baker (19 May 1817 – 20 December 1878) was an English railway engineer.

Between 1834 and 1839 Baker was articled to George W. Buck and then worked on the London and Birmingham Railway between London and Tring. From 1837 he worked with Buck on the Manchester and Birmingham Railway. He later became engineer of the Manchester, South Junction and Altrincham Railway while also working on the Shrewsbury and Birmingham and Shropshire Union Railways. He became engineer of the Stour Valley Railway and was then appointed as engineer of the Southern Division of the London and North Western Railway.

He was a consulting engineer in the construction of the 1862 International Exhibition building.

Following the death of Robert Stephenson he was appointed chief engineer of the London and North Western Railway Company. He wholly constructed, or remodelled and extended, the stations of the company in London, Liverpool and Manchester, as well as the stations in Birmingham, Preston, Bolton, Crewe, Warrington and Stafford. He constructed a new harbour at Holyhead and was responsible for designing and overseeing the building of the Runcorn Railway Bridge. Baker was designer and engineer of the Battersea Railway Bridge. He also acted as consulting engineer to the West London Extension Railway and the North London Railway, and in Ireland he built the Dundalk, Newry and Greenore Railway and the North Wall Extension Railways. He was elected MICE in 1848.

== Works ==
- Oxley Viaduct, Gorsebrook Road, Wolverhampton 1847-49 (with Robert Stephenson)
- Belvidere Bridge, Uffington, Shropshire 1848 (now bridge number 438)
- Bridges on the Manchester South Junction and Altrincham Railway Viaduct 1849 (bridge over the Rochdale canal survives, bridge over Egerton Street replaced in 1976)
- Viaduct, Stafford Road, Wolverhampton 1849-51 (with Robert Stephenson)
- North Wall extension railway, Dublin 1861
- Wigan, Tyldesley and Eccles Railway 1861-64
- Cremorne Bridge, Battersea 1863
- Manchester Piccadilly railway station 1862-66
- Stafford railway station 1862
- Goods shed south east of Stafford railway station ca. 1862
- Buxton Road Railway Bridge, Whaley Bridge ca. 1863
- City extension on the Kingsland Viaduct from Dalston Junction to Broad Street of the North London Railway 1864-65 (with William Lawford (resident engineer))
- Crewe railway station 1867
- Liverpool Lime Street railway station 1867 (with Francis Stevenson)
- Warrington Bank Quay railway station 1867-68
- Runcorn Railway Bridge 1868
- Earlestown wagon factory 1868 (extensions)
- Standedge Railway Tunnel (second bore) 1868-71
- Euston railway station 1870 (enlargement)
- Dundalk, Newry and Greenore Railway 1873
