= Runcorn Railway Bridge =

Bridge in northwest England

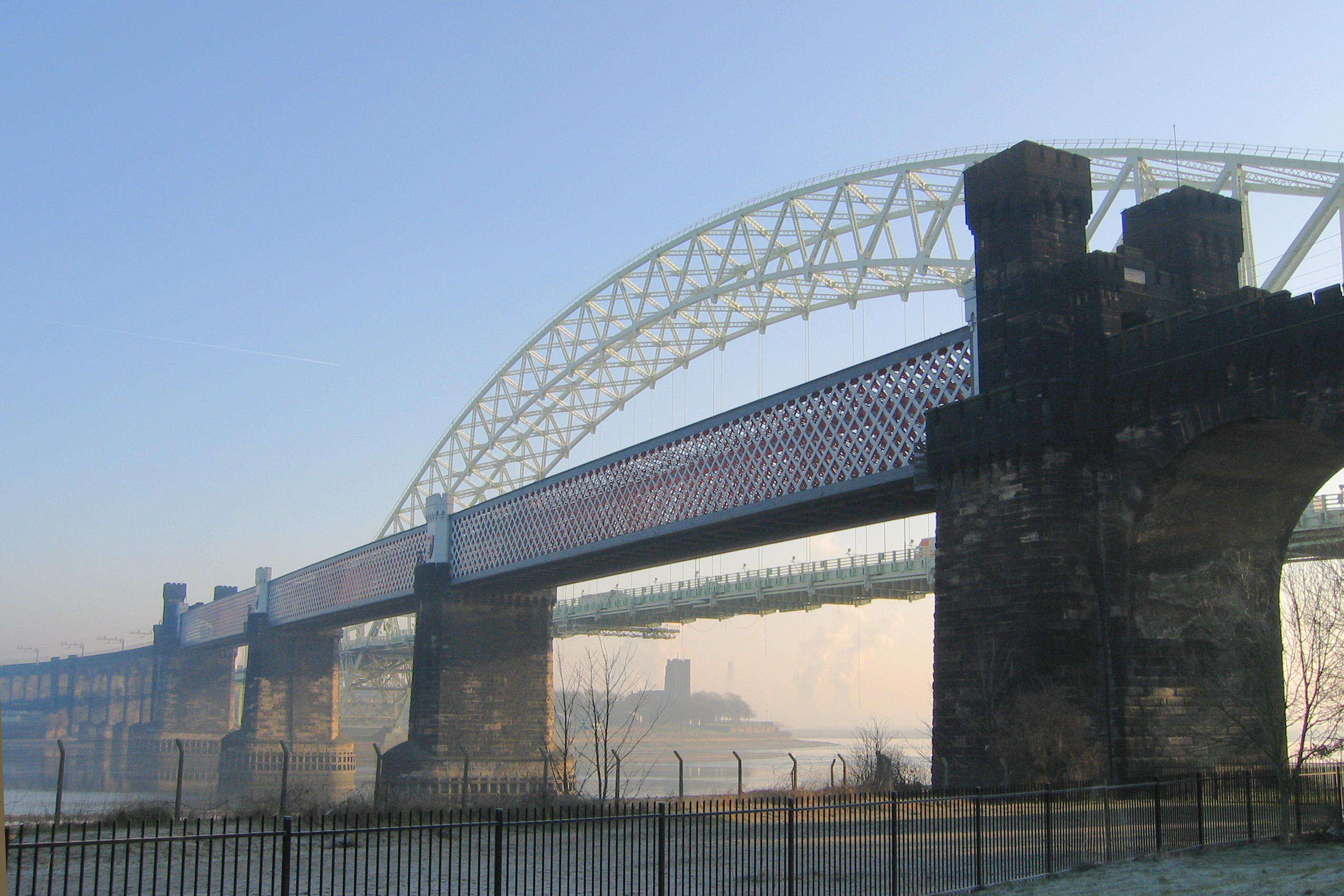
- Runcorn Railway Bridge
- Coordinates: 53.3468°N 2.7384°W
- Carries: Liverpool branch of the West Coast Main Line
- Crosses: River Mersey; Manchester Ship Canal
- Locale: Runcorn, Cheshire, England
- Other name(s): Ethelfleda Bridge; Queen Ethelfleda Viaduct; Britannia Bridge
- Maintained by: Network Rail

Characteristics
- Design: Double-web lattice girder
- Material: Wrought iron
- Width: Double track
- Longest span: 305 feet (93 m)
- Clearance below: 75 feet (23 m)

History
- Designer: William Baker
- Opened: 1868; 158 years ago

Statistics

Listed Building – Grade II*
- Designated: 6 October 1983
- Reference no.: 1130418

Location
- Interactive map of Runcorn Railway Bridge

The Runcorn Railway Bridge, Ethelfleda Bridge or Britannia Bridge crosses the River Mersey at Runcorn Gap between Runcorn and Widnes in Cheshire, England. It stands alongside the Silver Jubilee Bridge. The bridge is recorded in the National Heritage List for England as a Grade II* Listed building.

In 1861, legal powers for a railway crossing the Mersey were obtained by the London and North Western Railway (LNWR). The design for a bridge and viaducts was produced by William Baker, the company's chief engineer. In 1863, preparatory work for the bridge and approach viaducts commenced. The bridge was completed in 1868 and was opened for traffic on 10 October. The first goods traffic crossed the bridge on 1 February 1869 and the first passenger train on 1 April.

The bridge has received few alterations. In 1965, the pedestrian footway alongside the railway was closed to the public but retained for maintenance access. The bridge is used by rail traffic on the Liverpool branch of the West Coast Main Line. The lines are electrified and 25 kV AC overhead lines installed. Starting in the 2010s, the bridge has undergone a lengthy maintenance programme that will extend its life for another 150 years.

== History ==
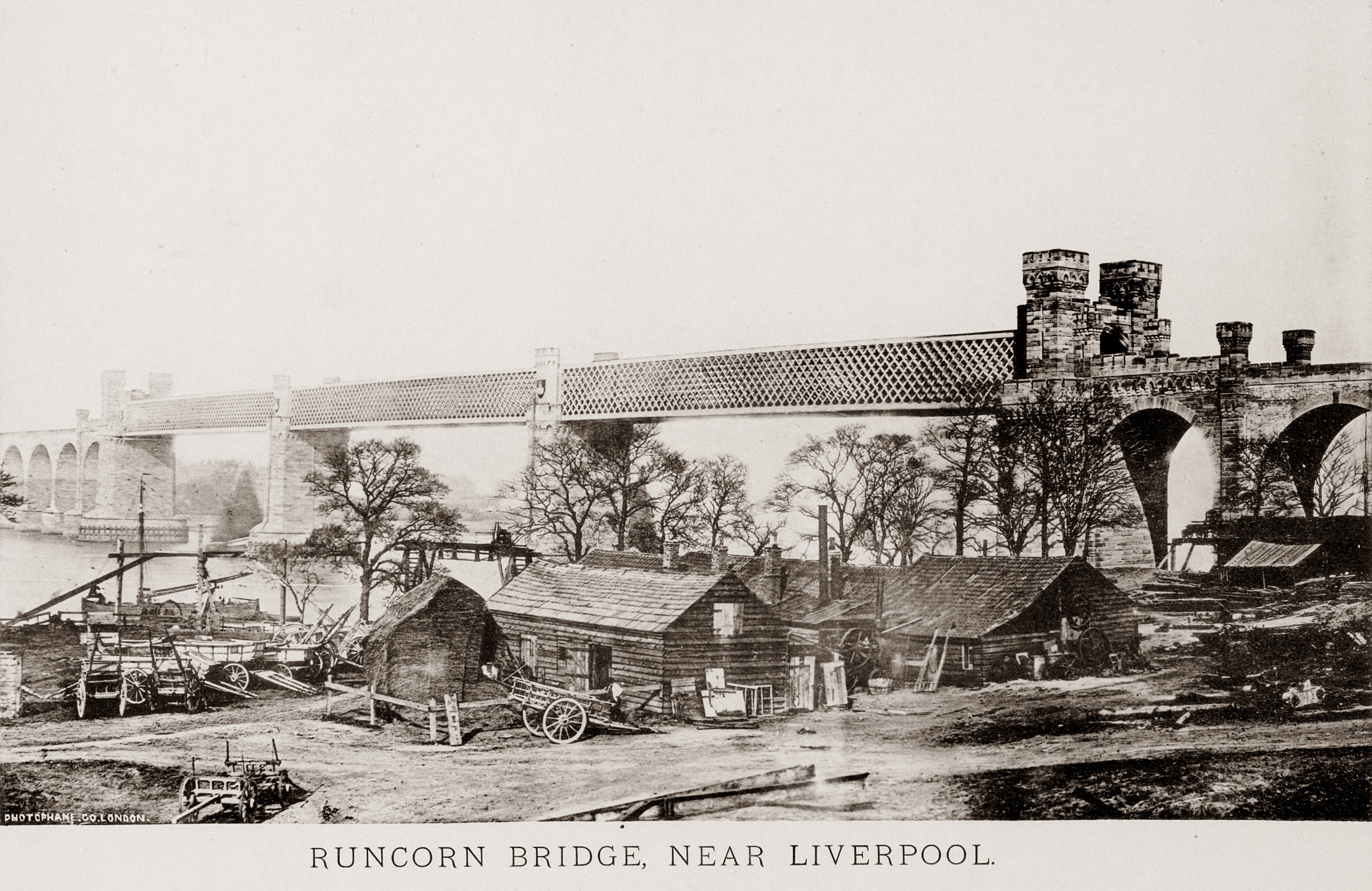
Runcorn Railway Bridge c. 1880

In 1846, the Grand Junction Railway obtained the Grand Junction Railway (No. 2) Act 1846 (9 & 10 Vict. c. cclxi) authorising the construction of a bridge over the River Mersey at the Runcorn Gap. A time limit of seven years was imposed. The Grand Junction Railway amalgamated with several other companies to form the London and North Western Railway (LNWR). The seven-year time limit passed without construction taking place and the powers granted by the act lapsed.

The LNWR received powers in the London and North Western Railway (Lines Near Liverpool) Act 1861 (24 & 25 Vict. c. cxxviii) to build a line crossing the Mersey from Aston southeast of Runcorn, to join the line from Crewe to Warrington at Weaver Junction, west of Widnes, where it met the line from Warrington to Garston at Ditton Junction. The line was 8.5 miles (14 km) long and reduced the distance between Liverpool Lime Street and the stations south of the River Weaver by more than 8 miles (13 km). The bridge at Runcorn gap was the responsibility of William Baker, the chief engineer of the LNWR. The cost of the deviation line from Ditton to Dutton including the bridge was £611,772 (equivalent to £62,960,000 in 2025) and Baker was paid a bonus of £1,000 (equivalent to £100,000 in 2025) when it was completed.

During 1863, preparatory work commenced at Runcorn and the first stone was laid in 1864. The bridge's approach viaducts were major structures. By 1868, the bridge was completed and on 21 May the contractor's locomotive Cheshire drew a train of 20 wagons over the bridge. It was opened for traffic on 10 October. The first goods traffic crossed the bridge on 1 February 1869, followed by the first passenger train on 1 April.

During the early 1890s the Manchester Ship Canal was constructed, passing underneath the railway bridge. During the 1880s and 1890s, champion diver Tommy Burns was known to jump off the railway bridge in front of spectators or as a challenge. The footway was closed to pedestrians in 1965 but remains intact for access by railway personnel and carries an 11 kV electrical cable between Widnes and Runcorn. The bridge remains in use for rail traffic on the Liverpool branch of the West Coast Main Line. The lines on the bridge are electrified with 25 kV AC overhead lines.

An ongoing maintenance programme to address 150 years of wear and tear began in the 2010s. The programme is being carried out in three phases. Phase One involved intrusive surveys, including bores into the main deck, in preparation for the following phases. Phase Two involved mechanical repairs and waterproofing the east and west bottom chords along all three spans. Phase Three will replace the structure's main bearings; this will involve jacking up the span structures.

== Structure ==
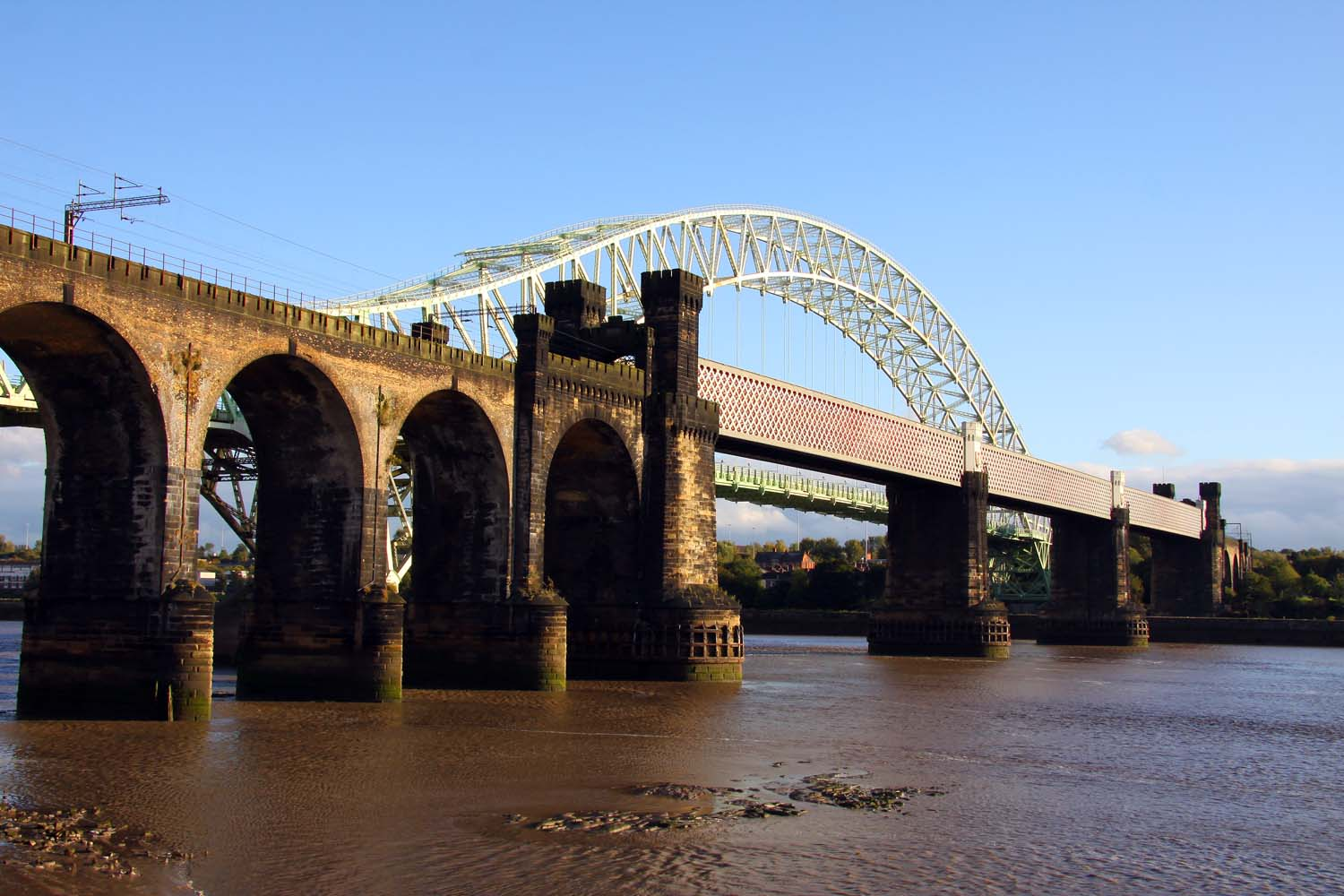
View of the bridge from Widnes

The bridge carries a double-tracked railway across the River Mersey; it has been recognised as a Grade II* listed structure. The tracks are laid on a metal deck supported by top and bottom box-girder chords, carried on 8.5 m-high (28 ft) trusses. The bridge superseded a centuries-old ferry and a pedestrian footbridge set alongside the main girders was provided on its eastern side. Upon completion, the bridge was the longest of its type. An engraved stone plaque on the northerly portal records that the main contractor was Brassey & Ogilvie and the ironworks were manufactured by Cochrane Grove & Co. Large portions of the original ironworks have been restored or replaced with new castings.

As built, the bridge consisted of three wrought iron spans of 305 ft (93 m), each located on top of two sandstone abutments with foundations at a depth of about 45 ft (14 m) below water level. The trusses support the metal bridge deck, which carries the railway lines. The erection of the lattice girder spans was unusual, because instead of floating the finished sections down the river and lifting them into position, each was built up piece by piece in situ. There are six lattice girders, two for each span. Each girder contains around 700 tons of iron and is fastened by 48,115 rivets. During the first half of the 20th century, some of the wrought iron girders were replaced by steel counterparts.

The bridge has a clearance of 75 ft (23 m) above the high-water mark allowing sailing ships to pass beneath. The height was stipulated by the Admiralty which had insisted on a clearance of at least 75 ft. The approaches to the bridge on both sides accommodated its considerable height and a gradient of 1 in 114 was needed to obtain the necessary clearance beneath the central spans. On the north side of the river, the bridge is approached by a 49-arch viaduct and a short embankment followed by 16 arches. From the south, it is approached by a 33-arch viaduct. The viaduct piers, bridge abutments and the bridge's central piers are of sandstone and the viaduct arches are of brick.

Maintenance of the bridge poses challenges; as it is exposed to high winds, the prevailing conditions must always be considered. The limited space, particularly on the narrow walkway, makes access difficult, sometimes requiring suspended scaffolding and climbing ropes. More elaborate methods of moving supplies and equipment have included bespoke trolleys and lifting frames and helicopters. Maintenance staff wear harnesses and are tied onto elements of the bridge and, on occasion, rescue boats have been on standby in case personnel fall from the bridge.

From the mid-2010s, extensive repairs and modifications have been carried out. The cantilevered walkway's cast iron parapets were removed and restored, its cantilevered beams and bottom chords were grit-blasted, the end plates were removed and replaced for greater strength. It was painted with two-pack epoxy paint, with a polyurethane top coat coloured to match the rest of the structure. Work was carried on bridge's drains and waterproofing, especially the castellated turrets and the timber fenders that protect the piers from damage. Work on the bridge requires authorisation from Halton Borough Council's planning authority and the Marine Management Organisation because of the potential impact on shipping.

== Name ==
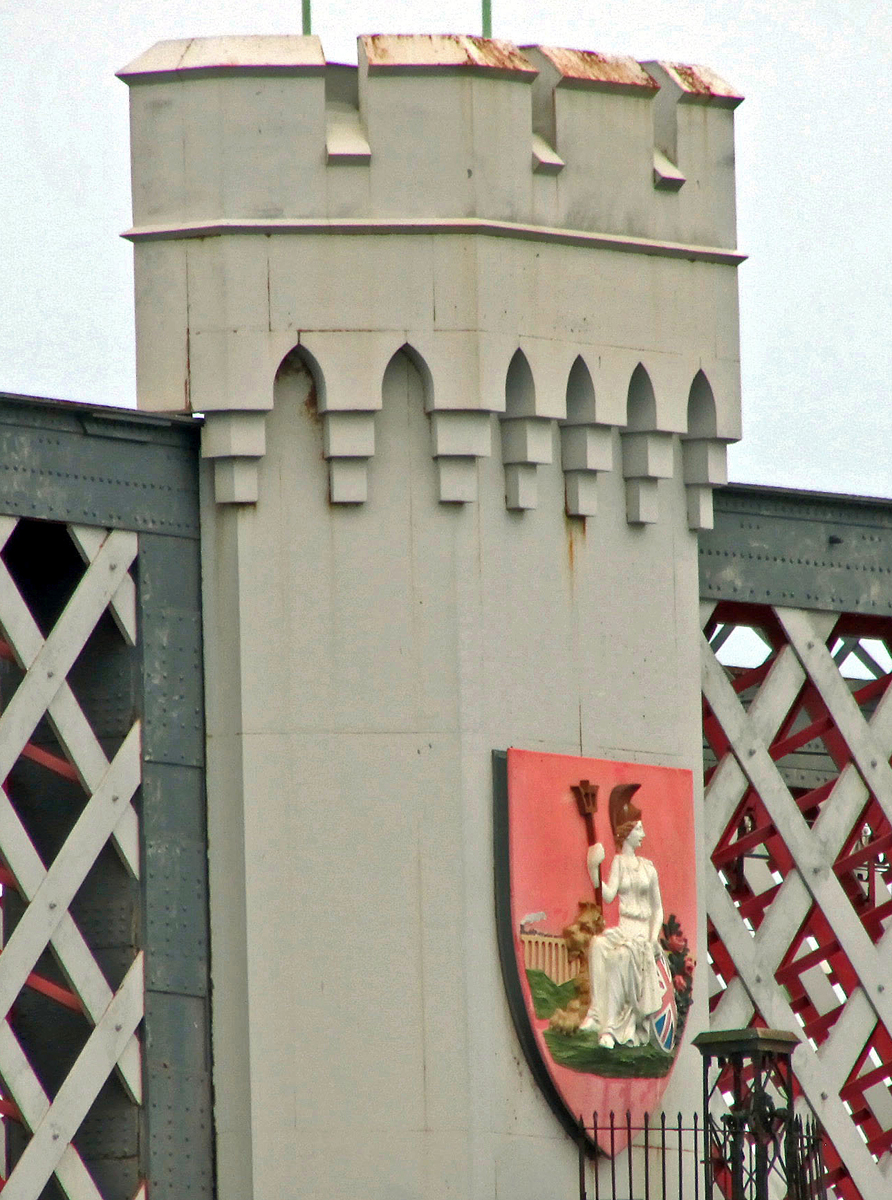
Britannia shield on the western face of the bridge, showing an LNWR loco and train crossing the linked viaduct

The official name of the bridge has been a subject of debate. Locally, it has been called the Queen Ethelfleda Viaduct, but is also called the Britannia Bridge. It has been claimed that it was named after Ethelfleda, a ruler of the historic Anglo-Saxon kingdom of Mercia, and that the southern abutments and pier of the bridge have been built on the site of the Saxon burh that had been erected by her in 915. This connection is alleged to be the reason why the LNWR had opted to have elements of the bridge castellated. There are three shields above the footway showing, from the southern end, the coat of arms of the City of London, and on the central and Widnes end, Britannia (from the crest of the railway company). Because of the presence of the crest, the bridge is also known as the Britannia Railway Bridge, and has also been referred to as "Tueller's Girder".

== Gallery ==
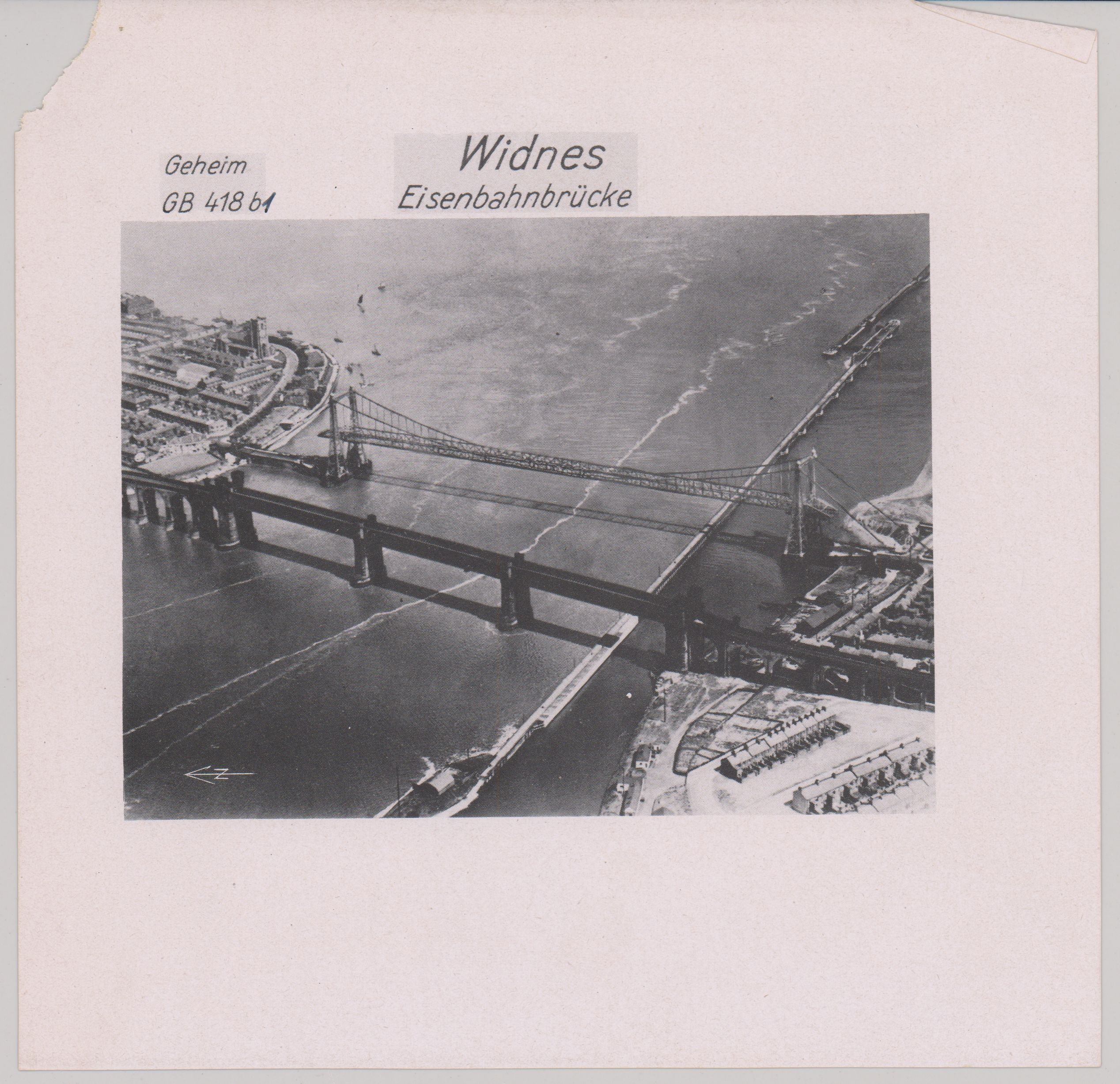
An aerial view of the railway bridge and Widnes–Runcorn Transporter Bridge from a Luftwaffe bombing target dossier, 1939

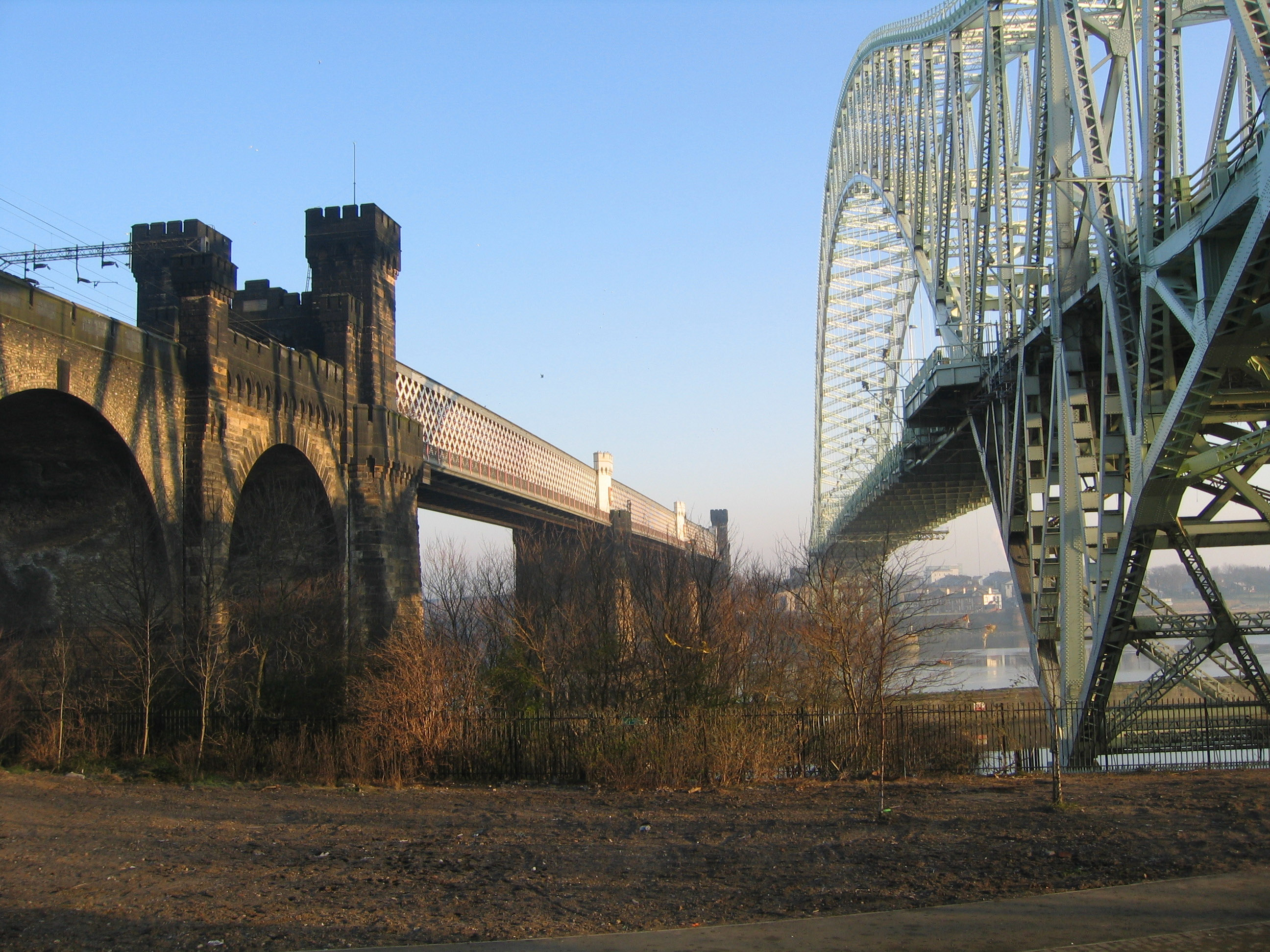
Ground view between the Runcorn Railway Bridge and the Silver Jubilee Bridge, 2004

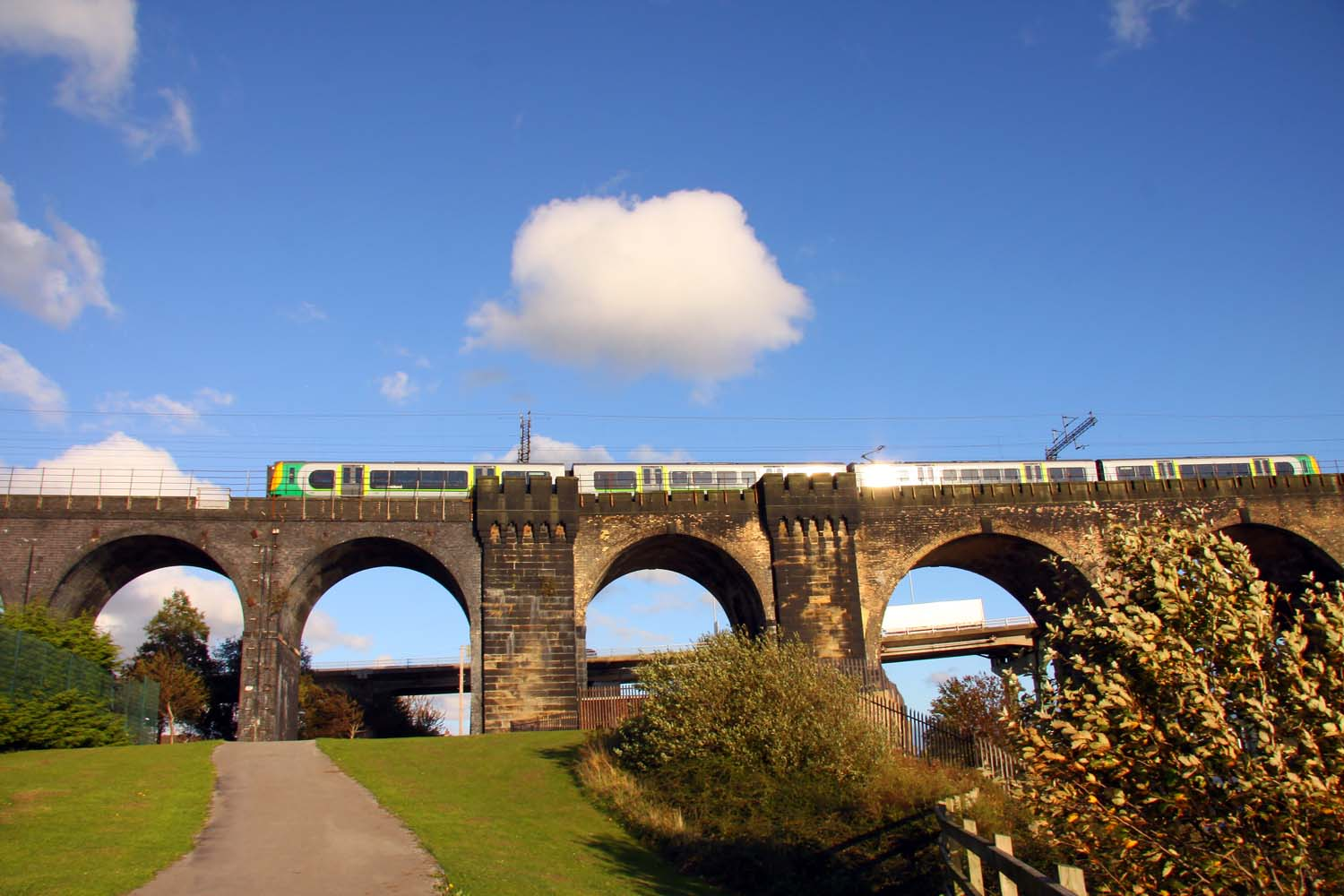
Train moving from the bridge onto Runcorn Gap Viaduct

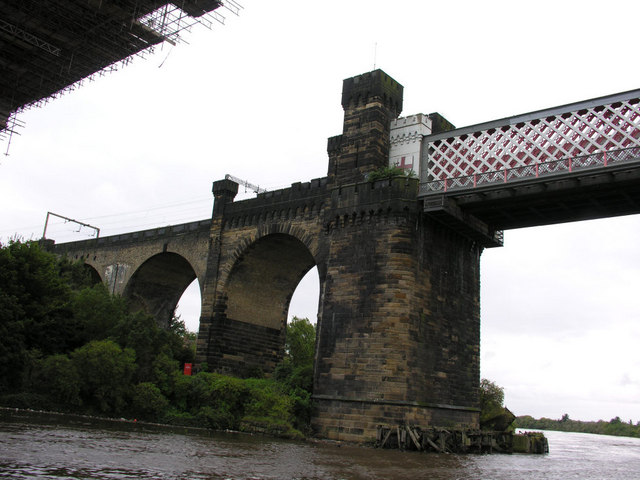
View of the Southern end of the Runcorn Railway Bridge, 2008

== See also ==
- Grade I and II* listed buildings in Halton (borough)
- Listed buildings in Runcorn (urban area)
- Listed buildings in Widnes
- Widnes-Runcorn Transporter Bridge
- Silver Jubilee Bridge
- List of lattice girder bridges in the United Kingdom

Next crossing upstream	River Mersey	Next crossing downstream
Silver Jubilee Bridge	Runcorn Railway Bridge; Grid reference SJ5089483431	Mersey Railway Tunnel
