= Loughton, Shropshire =

Village in Shropshire, England

Coordinates: 52.444°N 2.567°W

Loughton
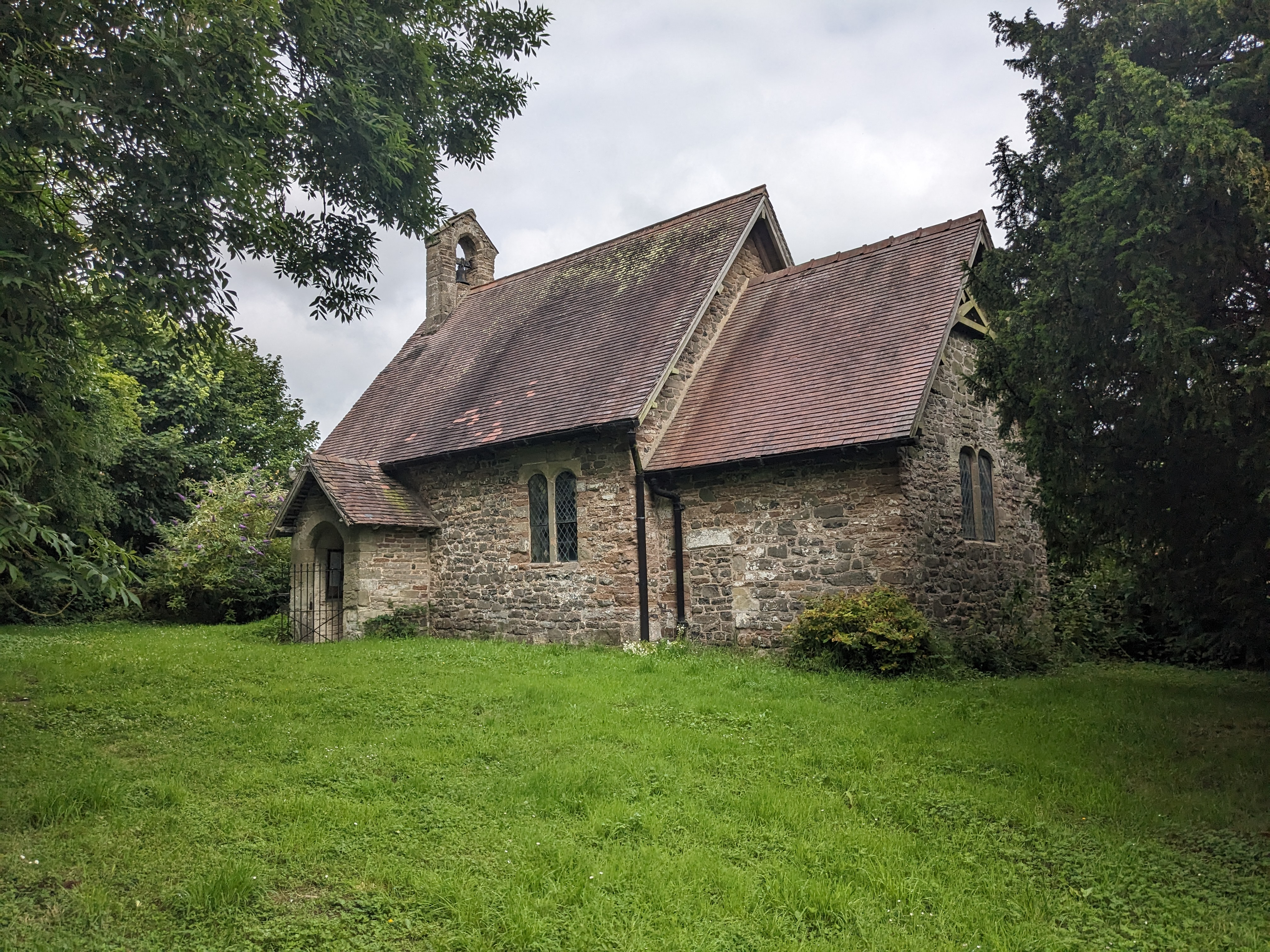
- The 17th-century church of Loughton

- Location within Shropshire
- OS grid reference: SO614830
- Civil parish: Wheathill
- Unitary authority: Shropshire
- Ceremonial county: Shropshire
- Region: West Midlands
- Country: England
- Sovereign state: United Kingdom
- Post town: BRIDGNORTH
- Postcode district: WV16
- Dialling code: 01584
- Police: West Mercia
- Fire: Shropshire
- Ambulance: West Midlands
- UK Parliament: Ludlow

Loughton is a village and former civil parish, now in the parish of Wheathill, in Shropshire, England. In 1961 the parish had a population of 48.

It is situated 9.5 miles (15.3 km) from Ludlow and 10.7 miles (17.2 km) from Bridgnorth, which is the post town in Loughton addresses.

The Church of England parish church in Loughton is still used today, though the school is not. The church is not visible from the road and is accessed by going up three precarious stone steps on the far side of Church Farm, just off the road. In the churchyard is a very old yew tree. Every summer, there is an annual barbecue in the church grounds and every Christmas there is a carol service with punch and mince pies afterwards. The church itself is very plain and simple in design, with no stained glass windows.

== History ==
Loughton was formerly a chapelry in the parish of Chetton, In 1866, Loughton became a civil parish in its own right. On 1 April 1967 the parish was abolished and merged with Wheathill.

== See also ==
- Listed buildings in Wheathill
