= Aston Eyre Hall =

Coordinates: 52.5430°N 2.5123°W

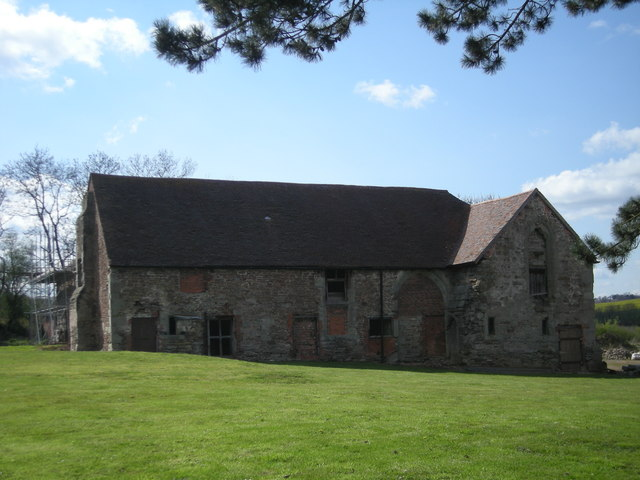
- Aston Eyre Hall
- Interactive map of the Aston Eyre Hall area

General information
- Status: Occupied
- Type: Manor house
- Classification: Grade II*
- Location: Aston Eyre, United Kingdom
- Construction started: Mid-14th century

Technical details
- Material: Stone

Aston Eyre Hall is an unfortified stone manor house at Aston Eyre near Bridgnorth in the English county of Shropshire, United Kingdom. It is a Grade II* listed building.

== History ==
Aston Eyre Hall was built in the mid-14th century, probably for Alan de Charlton, who acquired the estate by marriage to Margery FitzAer and died in 1349.

It consists of a hall range, with a service wing to the south-west and a parlour cross-wing to the north, and a detached gatehouse to the east, across what would have been an unusually large entrance court. The gatehouse has been incorporated into a farmhouse, but tree-ring dendrochronology dating of the surviving timber floors have suggested a felling date of 1341–52. A large timber-framed barn enclosing the courtyard on the north has been similarly dated to 1613.

The hall dais was originally lit from a large window bay, which has been demolished although traces remain. There must have been a central hearth in the hall. Both the parlour wing and the south range had heated upper chambers. The narrow extension of the south range has several slit windows for storerooms, and excavations have revealed the footings of an equally narrow west range, no doubt also used for storage.

== Popular culture ==
The manor was the subject of a season 5 episode of the Channel 4 series Time Team. Filmed between 27 and 29 June 1997, the team attempted to uncover and decode the history and development of the site.
