= Listed buildings in Wheathill =

Wheathill is a civil parish in Shropshire, England. It contains 14 listed buildings that are recorded in the National Heritage List for England. Of these, three are listed at Grade II*, the middle of the three grades, and the others are at Grade II, the lowest grade. The parish contains the villages of Wheathill, Loughton, and Silvington, and is otherwise rural. Almost all the listed buildings are in the villages, and consist of churches, houses, farmhouses, farm buildings, and a sundial, the one listed building outside the villages being a milepost.

== Key ==
Grade	Criteria
II*	Particularly important buildings of more than special interest
II	Buildings of national importance and special interest

== Buildings ==
Name and location	Photograph	Date	Notes	Grade
Holy Trinity Church; 52.43602°N 2.55757°W		12th century	The church was altered in the 14th and 17th centuries, and was restored in 1861, when the porch, bellcote and some windows were added. It is built in stone with a tile roof, and consists of a nave, a south porch, and a chancel, and on the west gable is a bellcote. The chancel contains a Norman window in the north wall, and a 14th-century window and a priest's door in the south wall.	II*
St Michael's Church; 52.41535°N 2.55855°W		12th century	The oldest parts of the church are the tower and the nave, the chancel dating from the 14th century, and with further alterations in the 17th century, the porch being added in 1662. The church is built in stone with a tile roof, and consists of a nave, a south porch, a chancel, and a west tower. The tower has a lancet window and an embattled parapet, and the windows in the body of the church are paired lancets.	II*
Manor Farmhouse and byre 52.41535°N 2.55942°W	—	13th century	The manor house, later a farmhouse, was extended in the 16th century, and is in stone with a tile roof. There are two storeys and an attic, and an L-shaped plan with a four-bay main range, a cross-wing to the rear. Also, at the front is a surviving two-bay medieval range used as a byre, on the right end are a lean-to an further extensions, and on the front is an open gabled porch. Most of the windows are mullioned or mullioned and transomed, and there are also lancet windows, slit windows, and two 20th-century casements. The double-moated site in which the farmhouse stands is a scheduled monument.	II*
Parish Church; 52.44352°N 2.56688°W		1622	The church was restored in 1904 when the porch and vestry were added. It is built in stone with a tile roof, and consists of a nave, a south porch, a lower chancel, and a north vestry. On the west gable is a bellcote. The doorway has a segmental head, and the windows have two lights, each with a segmental head.	II
Upper House Farmhouse and storage range 52.41419°N 2.56119°W	—	16th century	The farmhouse was extended in the 18th century. The original part is in painted timber framing with painted brick infill and stone gable ends, the later part is in rendered stone and brick, and the roofs are tiled. There are two storeys, and an L-shaped plan, the original range with three bays, the later range with two bays at right angles, and there is a single-storey storage range to the right. The windows in the older range are casements, and in the later range most are sashes, and there is a lean-to porch.	II
Church Farmhouse; 52.44377°N 2.56676°W	—	17th century	The farmhouse was altered and extended in the 19th century. It is in stone with brick dressings, at the rear is painted timber framing with brick infill, and the roof is tiled. There are two storeys, an attic and a cellar, a two-bay range and a cross-wing. The windows are casements and there are two gabled half-dormers.	II
Doctor's Cottages; 52.43349°N 2.56057°W	—	17th century	A pair of houses, later combined into one, the building is timber framed with infill partly in painted brick and partly in rendered lath, the rear and side walls are in stone, and the roof is tiled. There is one storey and an attic, a two-bay range with gabled extensions at the ends, and a two-bay cross-wing. Some windows are mullioned, and other are casements.	II
Barn, stables and cowhouses, Manor Farm; 52.41570°N 2.55885°W	—	18th century	The farm buildings are in stone, and have a timber framed loft level with weatherboarding, and a tile roof. There are nine bays, and the ground floor openings have segmental-arched lintels. The openings include various doorways and ventilation slits.	II
Stables, Manor Farm; 52.41540°N 2.55893°W	—	18th century	The stables, later used for other purposes are in stone with quoins and a tile roof. There is a single storey with an attic and a single storey extension. In the main part is a stable door with a brick segmental arch and a gabled dormer, and in the extension is a plain door and a casement window.	II
Stables, Upper House Farm; 52.41391°N 2.56111°W	—	18th century	The stables, later used for other purposes are in stone with a corrugated iron roof. There is a single storey and a loft, and one bay. The openings have segmental-headed lintels, and consist of a stable door, a window, and a loft door.	II
Wall, gateway, overthrow and trough, St Michael's Church; 52.41513°N 2.55810°W		18th century	The stone wall encloses the churchyard on the north, east and south sides. On the east side, steps lead up to the gateway that has oak gates flanked by chamfered oak posts with carved caps and trefoils. Above the gateway is a cast iron overthrow supporting a lamp bracket. On the north side is a niche containing an iron water trough.	II
Old Rectory; 52.43420°N 2.56157°W	—	Late 18th century	The rectory, later a private house, was extended in the 19th century. It is in stone with rendered front and side walls, partly with modillion eaves and with hipped slate roofs, and parapets to the extensions. There are two storeys, a main block of three bays with a rusticated ground floor and a string course, and at the rear is a bathroom extension and a service range. The porch has pilasters, above the door is a fanlight, and the windows are sashes.	II
Milepost; 52.42757°N 2.59884°W	—	Early 19th century	The milepost is on the northwest side of the B4364 road. It is in painted cast iron, and has a top plate inscribed with the name of the parish, and two angled destination plates indicating the distances in miles to Bridgnorth and to Ludlow.	II
Sundial; 52.41476°N 2.55789°W	—	19th century (probable)	The sundial is in the garden of the Old Rectory. It is in sandstone and probably incorporates medieval material. The sundial consists of four colonnettes, a square cap with moulded edge, and a square dial plate.	II
