= Silvington =

Village in Shropshire, England

Coordinates: 52.415°N 2.557°W

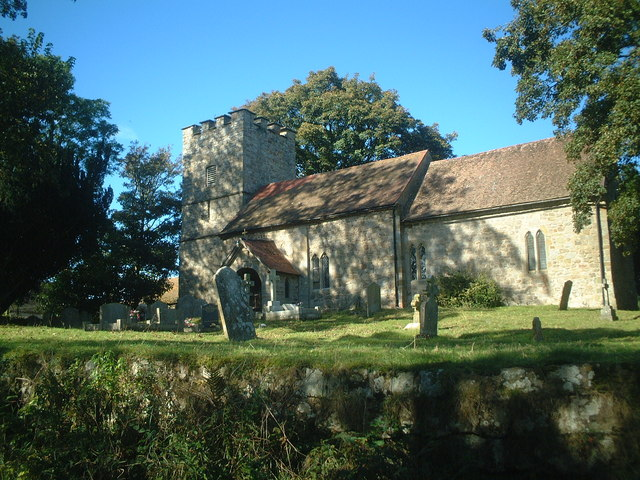
- St. Michael's Church, Silvington

- Location within Shropshire
- OS grid reference: SO621798
- Civil parish: Wheathill
- Unitary authority: Shropshire
- Ceremonial county: Shropshire
- Region: West Midlands
- Country: England
- Sovereign state: United Kingdom
- Post town: KIDDERMINSTER
- Postcode district: DY14
- Dialling code: 01584
- Police: West Mercia
- Fire: Shropshire
- Ambulance: West Midlands
- UK Parliament: Ludlow

Silvington is a village and former civil parish, now in the parish of Wheathill, in Shropshire, England.

The church is dedicated to Saint Michael and is in the Diocese of Hereford. In 1961, the parish had a population of 29.

== History ==
On 1 April 1967, the parish was abolished and merged with Wheathill.

== See also ==
- Listed buildings in Wheathill
