= Acton Burnell Hall =

Country house in Shropshire, England

Coordinates: 52°36′50″N 2°41′22″W

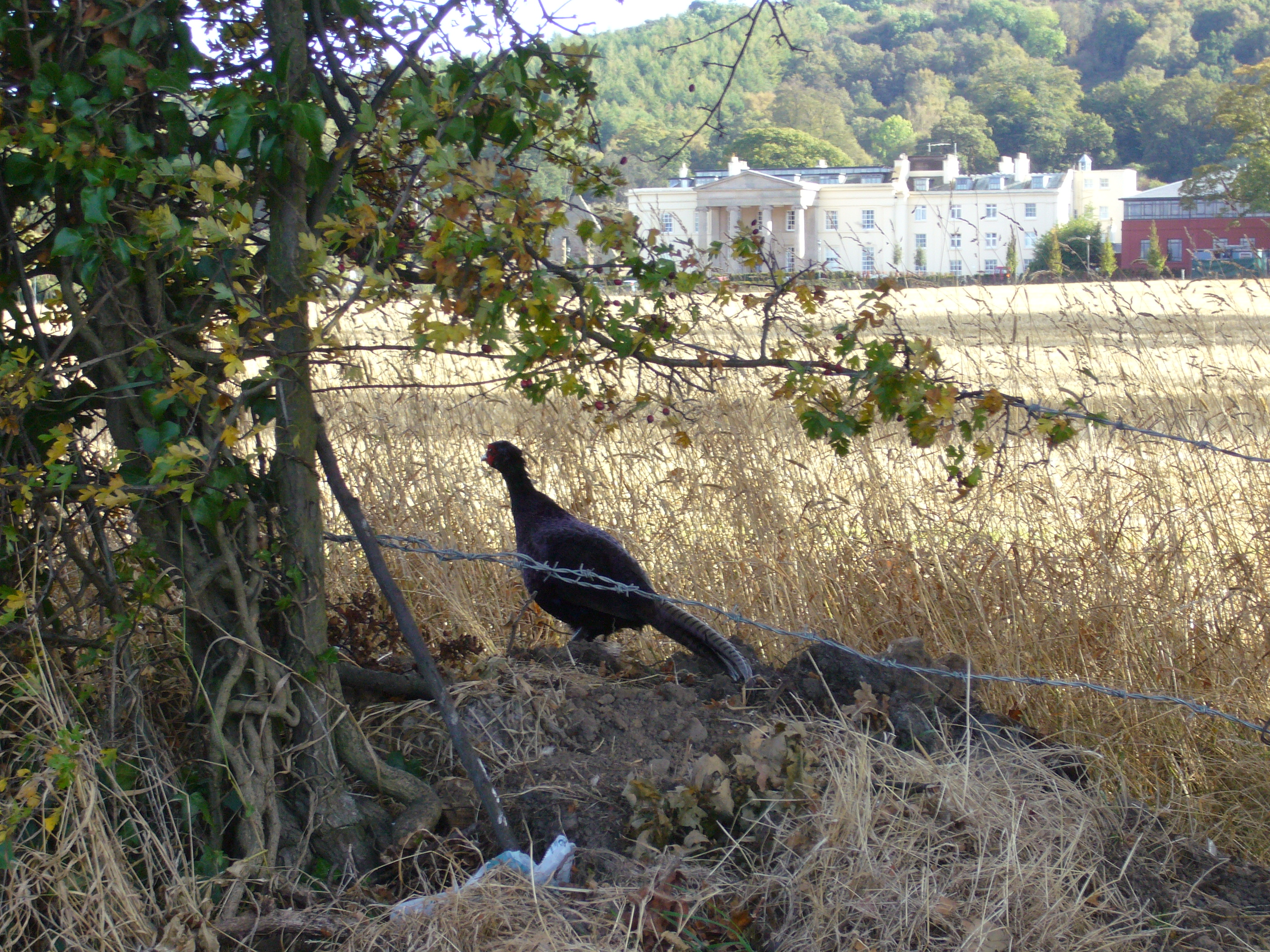
Acton Burnell Hall

Acton Burnell Hall is a 19th-century country house, now used as a private school, located near the village of Acton Burnell, Shropshire, England.

This house was built near to the castle in 1814 by the Smythe family. The hall is in classical style and is a Grade II* listed building. It is surrounded by parkland, with two lakes and a Gothic folly (Sham Castle). This folly has round towers, gothic windows and dates to 1780, standing on a mound in a field surrounded by trees. It was built for Sir Edward Smythe by Joseph Bromfield and used by the Smythe family as a music room.

Acton Burnell Castle was another folly in the grounds. Large entrance doors were knocked through the private residence buildings. A pyramid roof structure was placed on top of a tower, turning it into a dovecote.

Monks from the monastery of St Gregory’s, Douai, took refuge with Edward Smythe, the 5th baronet, until his death, whereupon they moved to Downside, Somerset in 1814.

The relatively modern Hall and surrounding land is now a privately owned college, Concord College. The gable ends of the great barn, where the parliament sat, survive and are situated on the private land.
