= Wenner =

Wenner is a surname. Notable people with the surname include:

- Axel Wenner-Gren (1881–1961), Swedish industrial magnate
- Charles F. Wenner (died 1882), American politician from Maryland
- Christopher Wenner (1954–2021), British journalist
- François Wenner (1889–1964), Lusambo provincial governor, Belgian Congo (1940–1944)
- Jann Wenner (born 1946), creator of Rolling Stone magazine
- Kurt Wenner, street artist
- Max Wenner (1887–1937), known for mysterious death
- Rosemarie Wenner (born 1955), Methodist bishop in Germany
- Violet B. Wenner (1884–1970), portrait painter

== See also ==
- Corliss v. Wenner, 34 P.3d 1100 (Idaho 2001), case decided by the Court of Appeals of Idaho
- Wenner-Gren Center, tower and building complex in Vasastaden, Stockholm
- Louise Wener, English musician and writer
