= Betchcott =

Hamlet in Shropshire, England

Coordinates: 52.583°N 2.834°W

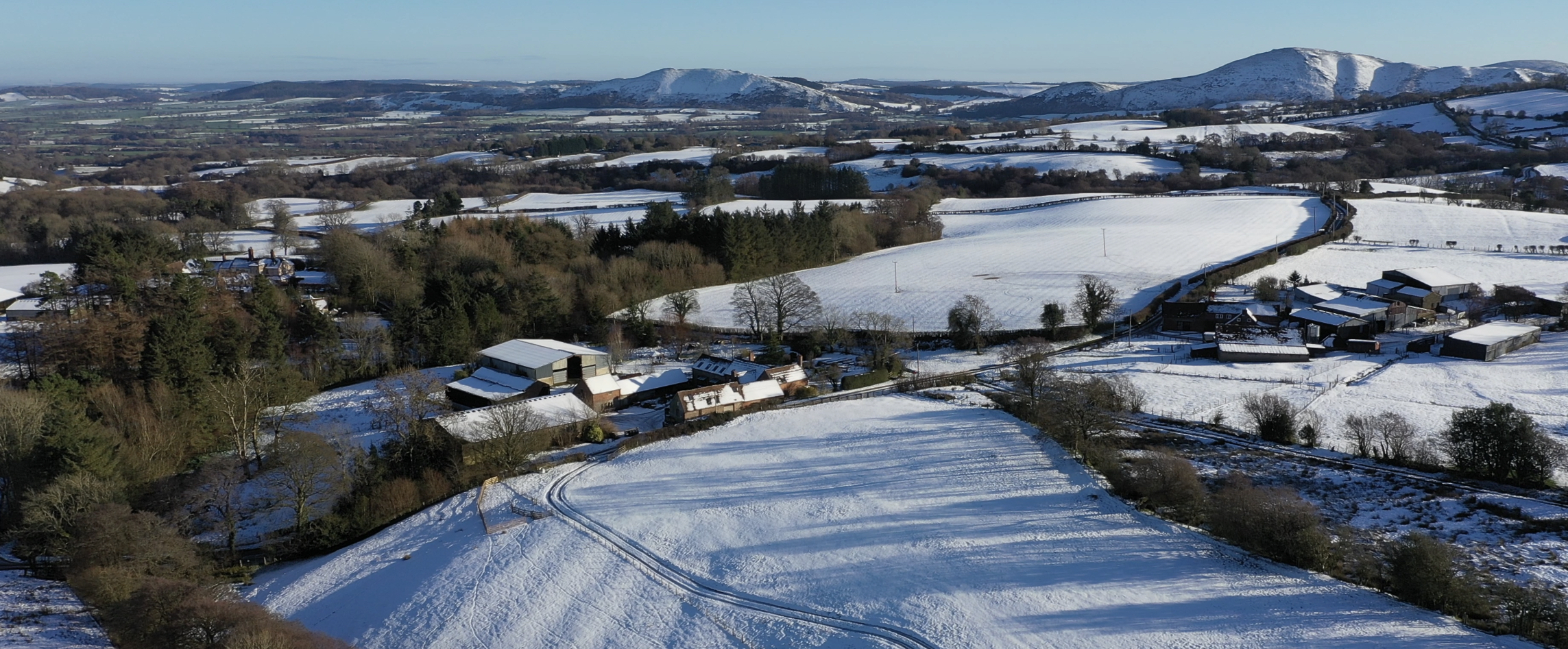
- The hamlet of Betchcott

- Location within Shropshire
- OS grid reference: SO434987
- Civil parish: Smethcott
- Unitary authority: Shropshire
- Ceremonial county: Shropshire
- Region: West Midlands
- Country: England
- Sovereign state: United Kingdom
- Post town: CHURCH STRETTON
- Postcode district: SY6
- Dialling code: 01694
- Police: West Mercia
- Fire: Shropshire
- Ambulance: West Midlands
- UK Parliament: Shrewsbury and Atcham

Betchcott (/bɛtʃkət/) is a hamlet near the villages of Picklescott and Woolstaston in Shropshire, England.

It lies in the parish of Smethcott, in the northern foothills of the Long Mynd. The nearest town is Church Stretton. The hamlet is made up of three farms, Upper Farm, Middle Farm and Batchcott Hall Farm, as well as Batchcott Hall and several other cottages.

Its name is derived from Old English bæce or bece, "brook", referring to a cottage by a brook.

Max Wenner (1887–1937), textile businessman, birder, landowner; possibly a British Secret Service agent assassinated by the Gestapo, lived at Betchcott Hall at time of his death.

== See also ==
- Listed buildings in Smethcott
