= Max Wenner =

British man who died mysteriously in 1937

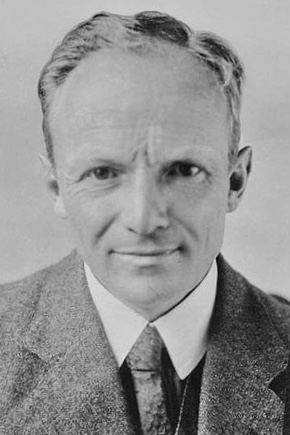
- Max Wenner, c. 1929
- Born: 15 April 1887; Manchester, England
- Died: 4 January 1937 (aged 49); Genk, Belgium
- Cause of death: Fall from height
- Body discovered: 8 January 1937
- Resting place: Genk Municipal Cemetery (Begraafplaats Genk Centrum), Belgium; 50.9566458°N 5.5057892°E
- Years active: 1907–1937
- Known for: Bird photography, lord of the manor of Church Stretton, possible agent of MI6 § Inter-war period
- Spouse: Dolly Spinner
- Relatives: Violet B. Wenner, Christopher Wenner

Max Victor Wenner (15 April 1887 – 4 January 1937) was a Briton of Swiss ancestry, textile business heir, country squire, wildlife photographer, citizen scientist (usually publishing as M.V. Wenner), and possible MI6 agent engaged in European espionage in the interwar period. He fell, jumped or was pushed out of a plane flying over Belgium in 1937. The exact circumstances of Wenner's death remain poorly understood but suggestions of Nazi involvement began shortly after the discovery of his body and have continued to the present day. News articles published in the wake of his death described Max Wenner as a "man of mystery".

== Biography ==
Max Wenner was born 15 April 1887 in Manchester, England (Note: Wenner's exact birthplace was variously listed as Chorlton, Lancashire or Didsbury, Manchester) to a Swiss family with textile industry, transportation and machinery investments. In 1891 at age four he lived with his parents, seven siblings aged 12 years to 12 months, and a governess, in a home staffed by three servants, on The Hill, near the village of Alderley Edge, in Cheshire. His father Alfred Wenner listed his work in 1891 as "shipping merchant" and in 1901 as "shipper of Manchester goods & machinery". Alfred Wenner married twice, first to Louise Egloff and then to her older sister Malvine Egloff. Max, along with Alfred Emil Wenner Jr. and Violet Beatrice Wenner, was a product of the second marriage, to Malvine, who was born in Austria but had Swiss residency. Max Wenner spoke eight languages, including fluent German and may have spent part of his childhood in Vienna.

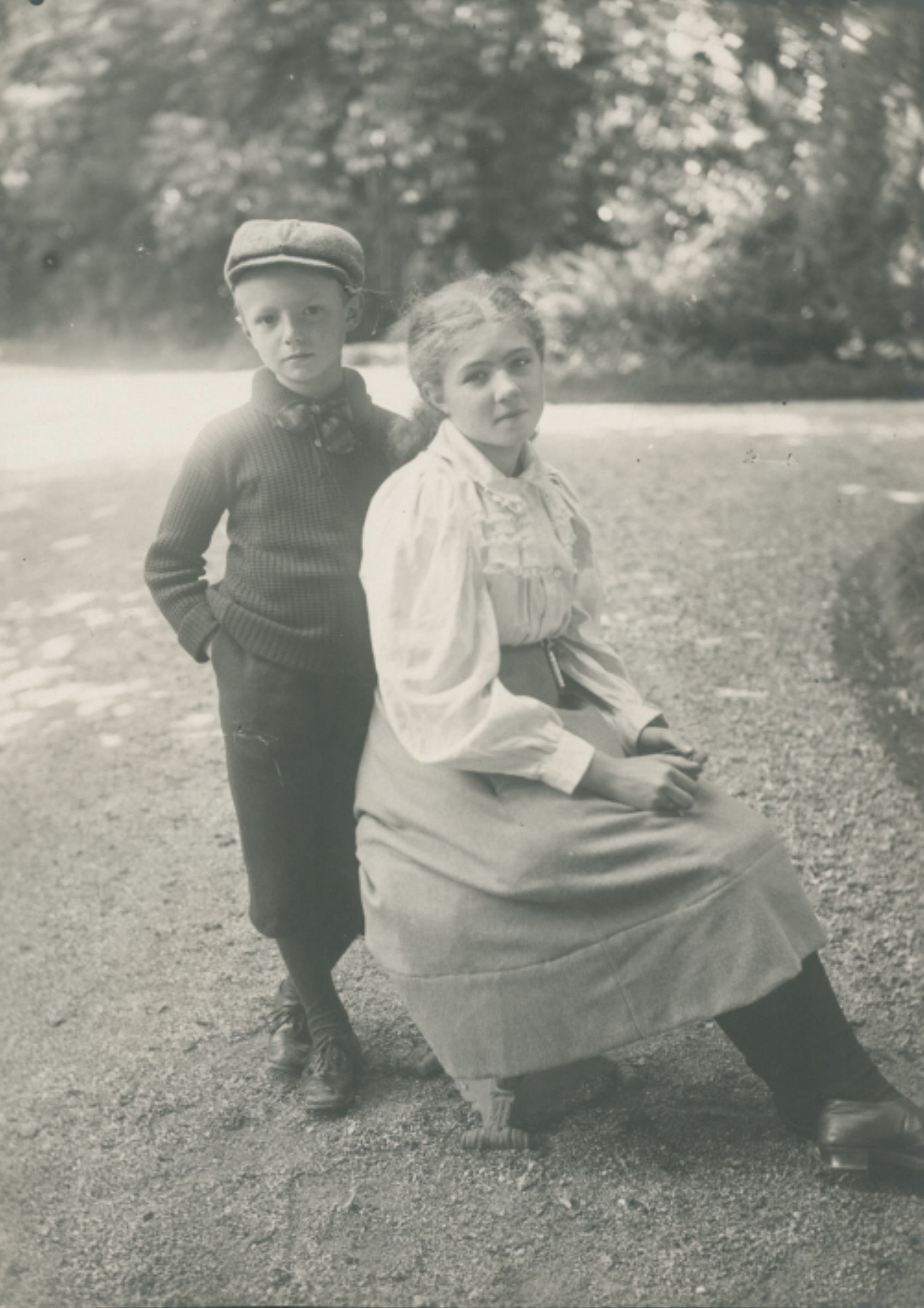
Max Wenner and his sister Violet Wenner, presumably 1890s (Archive of Canton St. Gallen)

Wenner attended Manchester Grammar School from 1900 to 1904, and the College of Technology, Manchester, and was listed as a "non-matriculated student" at Victoria University of Manchester in 1906–07. In 1911, Max lived with his widowed mother and older sister Rose at Bollin Fee, The Gables, and was a groomsman at the wedding of his sister Violet Beatrice Wenner to a young military officer and baron of the Kingdom of Württemberg. Wenner was admitted as a member of the British Ornithologists' Union in 1912, and remained an avid birder for the rest of his life. In 1914 he collected a clutch of three common buzzard eggs from Vienna Forest near Tullnerbach, bird's-nest collection being a then-standard practice of the ornithological subfield oölogy. Wenner's "Notes on Birds" journal from 1909–15 is held in the Alexander Library of the Edward Grey Institute of Field Ornithology at the University of Oxford.

When he was 25 years old, Wenner reportedly "took out one of the earliest flying licenses" at Hendon Aerodrome in 1912. He also served with the Royal Flying Corps during World War I, having obtained Royal Aero Club aviators' certificate 1757 on 17 September 1915 on "Hall Biplane, Hall School, Hendon" as Victor Max Wenner. (Note: The London Gazette reported on 5 October 1915 that Victor M. Wenner was named a second lieutenant (on probation) in the military wing of the Royal Flying Corps on 28 September 1915. The London Gazette reported on 15 October 1915 that "The appointment of Victor Max Wenner to a Second Lieutenancy which appeared in the London Gazette of the 6th October, 1915, is cancelled as from the 13th October 1915.") Circa 1916, he was a "private in the 20th (3rd Public Schools) Batt. Royal Fusiliers, subsequently Flight Sub Lieut., Royal Flying Corps," and apparently served with the RFC until the end of the war in 1918. Max's brother Alfred Wenner was a lieutenant of the Cheshire Regiment during World War I, ending his military career—due to ill health from wounds received—as a captain in October 1919.

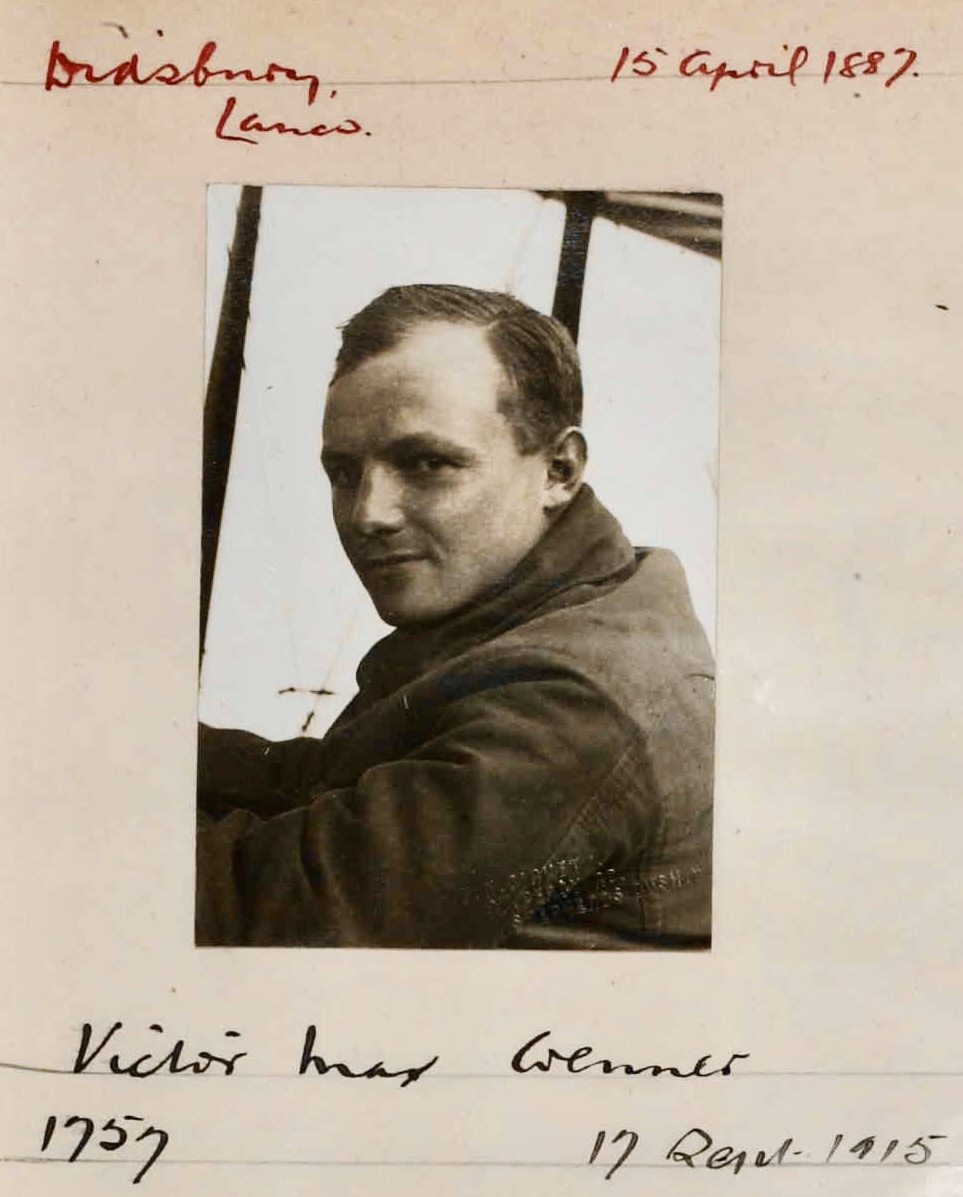
Max Wenner, age 28, Royal Aero Club photo album number five (Ancestry.com)

On 1 November 1922, at the age of 35, Wenner married Martha Alice Spinner, called Dolly or Dollie, at St Martin-in-the-Fields Church on Trafalgar Square, Westminster. Wenner's occupation was listed as ornithologist, Dolly was described as a spinster of full age. Dolly was also from Manchester industrial wealth—she had reportedly inherited somewhere in the vicinity of £200,000 (equivalent to about £17,776,060 in 2025) following the death of her father, "Mr. Ferdinand Spinner, a Manchester shipping merchant." Several of Wenner's nature photographs were published in Thomas Coward's Life of the Wayside and Woodland in 1923. In the late 1920s and early 1930s, Max and Dolly were residents of Garthmeilio Hall, Corwen, Merionethshire (now Llangwm, Conwy) in northern Wales, which has been a Grade II listed building since 1967. Wenner's photographs were again used to illustrate a T.A. Coward book, Bird and Other Nature Problems, published in 1931.

The year 1933 saw him on an epic fishing trip to Iceland with his brother; the pair caught 77 salmon between them. The article about the 1933 fishing at Kjarrá mentions that Max could be irritable and had experienced intermittent depressions since his service in the Great War. (Note: Max's brother Alfred E. Wenner also appears on a newspaper's list of passengers on an Icelandic ship in 1935.)

He became a resident of Shropshire, when he purchased the 17th-century home Batchcott Hall (Note: Sometimes misspelled Bathcote Hall) in the hamlet of Betchcott. In 1934 he bought the manor of Church Stretton and "had a third share in the Long Mynd. He improved the hall, adding a bird sanctuary, fishing lake and ponds." The total extent of his lands was 5,000–6,000 acres (20–24 km^{2}). In 1935, he sued "the Midland Gliding Club, who acquired certain rights on the Long Mynd" and Flight magazine reported, "Mr. Max Wenner, of Batchcott Hall, Leebotwood, was granted by Mr. Justice Crossman an injunction against Mr. C. E. Hardwick and Mr. Alfred Morris to prevent gliding flights from the latter's sheepwalk on the brow of the hill, on the grounds that the gliding interfered with Mr. Wenner's sporting rights and spoiled the grouse shooting." Wenner apparently "entertained many shooting parties but rarely took part in them himself." According to a New Zealand paper arguing the position that Wenner committed suicide due to overwhelming grief over his wife's death, the couple "enjoyed ideal happiness" at Batchcott Hall until Dolly was diagnosed with an unnamed serious illness. She received excellent medical care at home and "for three months Mr Wenner nursed his wife night and day." However, when it came time for Wenner's habitual summer fishing trip to Iceland "where he owned a river" he initially wanted to forgo it and stay with Dolly. She insisted, and he went, but she grew rapidly sicker after his departure. She had lapsed into unconsciousness before his return and died shortly after he arrived. According to the newspaper, "Mr Wenner never recovered from that blow, and he continually reproached himself for leaving his wife at such a critical time. He grew lonely and morose, and acquired the reputation in the neighbourhood of a man of mystery. He made himself very unpopular in the district by shooting foxes and ordering hounds off his land." Wenner's wife Dolly, said to have been an "invalid", died 27 July 1936. Max was the principal beneficiary of his late wife's estate, reportedly worth £90,000, but he was already a "very wealthy" man and was said to have given "large sums" to charity in the months leading up to his death.

A Limburg paper reported that Wenner was thought to be "secretive and sometimes strange" and that he frequently travelled by air, to "Iceland and Switzerland repeatedly, but especially Germany." Writing in March 1937, a New Zealand paper reported, "In the neighbourhood he had the reputation of a man of mystery. He was reserved and uncommunicative and it was believed that he chose to live at Batchcott Hall because of its remoteness...There was one mysterious thing in Max Wenner's life—a room in his Shropshire mansion to which servants were denied access. A kind of attic, it was always locked. It is believed to have contained cases and boxes in which Wenner's private papers were stored."

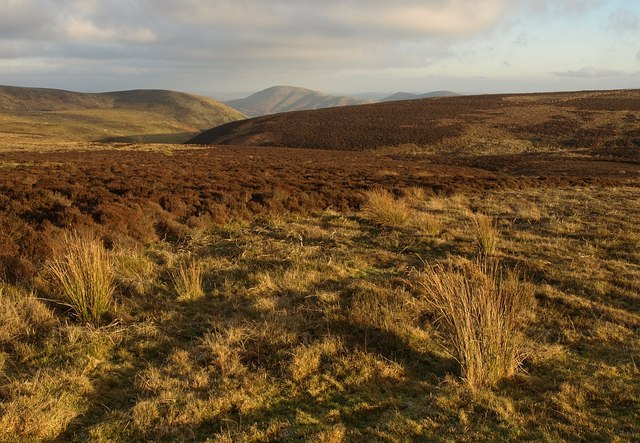
On the "grouse moor" of Long Mynd in winter (Derek Harper, geograph.org.uk)

According to the history of Batchcott Hall, now on offer as a holiday-house rental property:

Max Wenner was a frequent traveller to and from Germany and often hosted shooting parties from Germany and Austria at Batchcott Hall. Guests included the German Ambassador to Britain in the 1930s, von Ribbentrop, who flew to the gatherings in his Luftwaffe Junkers Ju 88 transport plane...Long Mynd being the best grouse shooting area in Britain outside Scotland...Max Wenner had connections to Nazis at the highest levels...Max Wenner's tragic death followed many years of travel between Germany and Britain. Records show that he found himself frequently shadowed and possibly involved in espionage as the appeasement movement declined in influence. Swastika-embossed pfennigs (Note: This may refer to Nazi-era German coinage; see Reichmark) were found throughout Batchcott Hall during its renovations in 2006, some of which appear in the library of the Hall today, together with press cuttings and estate agent's particulars of the sale of the Hall following his death.

The Batchcott Hall history asserts that there was at least one landing strip near the hall, "on the site of the original Midland Gliding Club (closer to Batchcott Hall and not the current Asterton location) or on the lower fields below Batchcott Hall." Both the Batchcott runway and the Asterton runway were demolished in 1939 at the outset of World War II to prevent them from being used by invading aircraft. The author of the 2004 countryside memoir The Prince of Poachers—whose father was the Long Mynd gamekeeper based at Manor Cottage in Ratlinghope—mentioned Max Wenner in his book:

One gets some fantastic winds up on the open moor. I think it must be the ideal spot for a gliding club; there seem to be very few windless days. A German [sic] gentleman, Max Wenner, was a leading light in this gliding idea there. He fell—or was he pushed?—out of a plane over the Channel [sic]. He was staying in a pub in Minsterley. Somehow Father was in on the search of his rooms. I remember seeing a gun in the shape and size of a fountain pen that fired a three-sided bullet.

— Bill Tuer, A Prince Among Poachers

A 2012 letter to The Daily Mirror in response to an article about the misadventures of murder suspect Lord Lucan brought up the tale of Max Wenner. The writer, a resident of Church Stretton, stated, "It was rumoured Wenner was flying wealthy Jews out of Germany for gold and that German foreign minister Ribbentrop was involved. Wenner lived at Batchcott Hall, Leebotwood, Shropshire, and it's said that Foreign Secretary Lord Halifax accompanied him shooting." In 2015, Max's nephew, Michael A. Wenner, a World War II veteran and retired British diplomat living in Houston, Texas, told a news writer that he had never heard anyone in the family mention Max Wenner meeting with Joachim von Rippentrop.

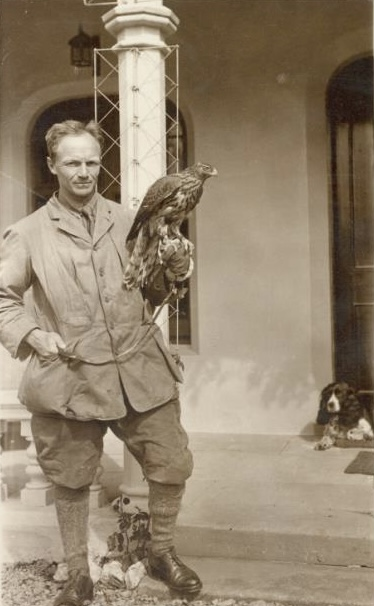
Max Wenner, with a northern goshawk and a springer spaniel, c. 1929 (Archive of Canton St. Gallen)

At the time of his death in 1937, Max Wenner had a 34-year-old German fiancée, Olga Büchsenschütz (Note: Olga's last name appeared in English-language newspapers in an array of spellings, including Bueckenschuetz, Buchsenchutz, Bucksenschultz, et al. This is the spelling provided by the Belgian researchers.) from the Kupferdreh district of Essen. Described as "an attractive brunette", she was said to live in a "small but comfortably furnished house with her aged parents and married sister." When they first met, apparently skiing at Lenzerheide in the Plessur Alps in Switzerland. An Australian newspaper claimed Büchsenschütz had been working as the secretary of the Swedish Consul-General at Düren, but "extensive research in German newspapers could not identify the existence of a Swedish consulate or consul in the city of Düren (which is closer to Aachen than Cologne). There were Swedish consuls-general in Aachen during the time under review (Fritz Mohren, a commodity trader) and Cologne (Richard v. Schnitzler, a banker and later Kurt v. Schröder, Schnitzler's son-in-law and also a banker)."

In December 1936, Wenner had proposed to her and she had accepted; they were to be married in Switzerland in three weeks.

In March 1937, Büchsenschütz recounted their relationship to a New Zealand newspaper:

Two years ago, while at winter sports in Switzerland, she met Max Wenner, and after that they corresponded occasionally...When she heard about Mrs Wenner's death last July, Olga wrote him a sympathetic letter, and since then they have met occasionally. At one of these meetings Mr Wenner proposed marriage and was accepted. Before Christmas it was arranged that they should meet at Cologne to make the final arrangements for the wedding. At Mr. Wenner's suggestion the marriage was to take place in Switzerland, as he was a Swiss by birth, to be followed by a honeymoon round Germany. His fiancée met him at Cologne Aerodrome on New Year's Eve, and they had gone to the Swiss Consul to ascertain the necessary procedure to their approaching marriage. Afterwards they spent some days at her home in Essen. On the morning of his death she kissed him goodbye at Essen Station and then, at his request, telephoned Cologne Airport, asking them to delay the departure of the Croydon airliner until he arrived.

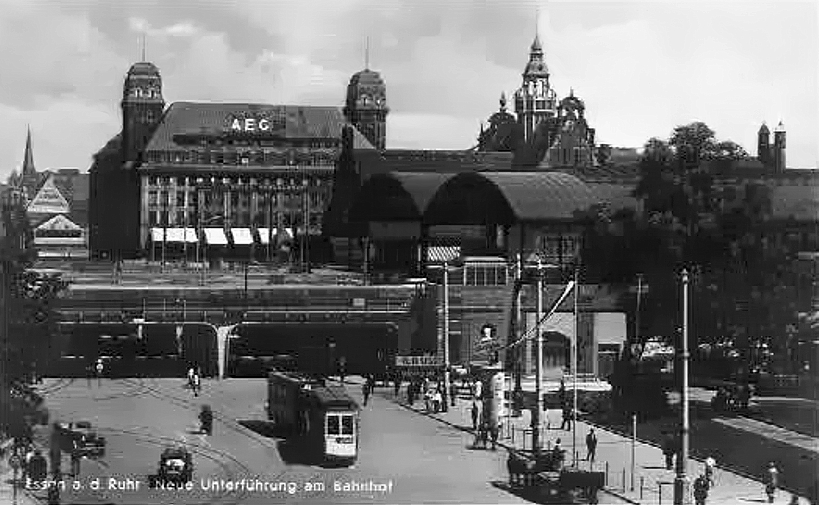
Essen train station before World War II

At the time of Wenner's death Olga was reportedly a private secretary of a director at a large factory of weapons and machines in the Ruhr area. (Note: Per the Belgian researchers, "Lucien Bogers vermeldde in 2002 dat het AG Kupherdrehe uit Essen was." transl. "Lucien Bogers mentioned in 2002 that it was AG Kupherdrehe from Essen." It is unclear what firm is referenced by AG Kupherdrehe but a "large factory of weapons and machines" may refer to the massive Krupp steelworks in Essen, the so-called "weapons forge of the German Reich" (German: Waffenschmiede des Deutschen Reiches) that the Allies later bombed dozens of times during World War II. Krupp was headquartered in Essen and had several sites in the city. The successor conglomerate is ThyssenKrupp AG. Aktiengesellschaft (AG) in German is any publicly-traded corporation.) Another account claimed that she was "private secretary to a well-known artificial silk manufacturer, and has made many trips with him in this capacity to Switzerland and other countries." At the time of his death, Wenner was said to have investments in spinning mills and other cotton manufacturing enterprises.

== Death ==
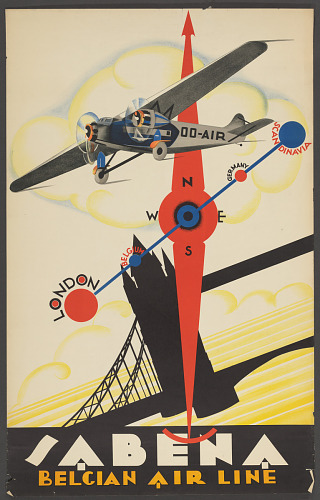
1930s Sabena "Belgian Air Line" poster advertising their European routes (U.S. Air and Space Museum)

On the afternoon of 4 January 1937 Wenner caught a Sabena Airlines flight from Butzweilerhof Flughafen Köln airport in Cologne, Germany to Luchthaven van Haren (French: Aérodrome de Haren) airport in Brussels, Belgium. He apparently arrived via taxi to the Savoia-Marchetti S.73 aircraft with just two minutes to spare before departure. The distance between Cologne to Brussels is less than 200 km (125 mi); the cruising speed of a S.73 was about 270 km/h (170 mph).

=== Disappearance ===
When the plane landed at Haren, Wenner was nowhere to be found. He was presumed to have fallen from a height of about 3,000 feet (910 m) over the Meuse River valley. He had been writing letters and then went to the back of the plane. Some torn fabric near the rear lavatory may have been evidence of a struggle. One history said the torn fabric was the "outside canvas" of the plane. Another said "the lavatory door had been considerably damaged." Still another said "the door in the floor of the luggage locker in the tail of the machine appeared to have been damaged."

A detailed account from within the plane was provided in March 1937 by "Mrs. J.V. Cain, formerly Miss Tinka Jackson, of Davenport [sic], Auckland." John Vincent Cain was a British pilot and petty criminal who would later claim to have delivered weapons and planes in early 1937 to Francisco Franco's Nationalists and other factions of the ongoing Spanish Civil War. Wenner's nephew, Michael A. Wenner, described Cain as "possibly a not too reliable witness" in his memoir. Tinka Jackson Cain of Walton-on-Thames, who on 4 January 1937 had been traveling with Cain, their baby, and a nanny, seemingly provided the extensive biographical detail about Wenner appended to the article, in addition to her eyewitness accounting:

MRS. CAIN'S STORY "We felt a slight lurch, and we immediately guessed something terrible had happened. Our nurse fainted, and I clutched my husband and asked him if there was anything we could do. Fortunately, my little daughter knew nothing." Mr. Cain and another passenger went through to the tail of the plane and found that Mr. Wenner had vanished.

Mr. and Mrs. Cain or other informants had readily on hand the names of other inexplicable mid-air suicides, such as the "beautiful American sisters Jane and Elizabeth du Bois, who in 1935 leaped, in each others arms" out of a plane over Essex after the men they loved, a pair of RFC aviators, were killed in a crash. Another article mentioned a pair of Swiss lovers jumping out of a plane over Basel in 1935, and a Canadian leaping from a plane over the Toronto airport the same year. A contemporary researcher in Church Stretton has surmised that the Max Wenner incident was a copycat crime modeled on the 1928 disappearance of Alfred Loewenstein.

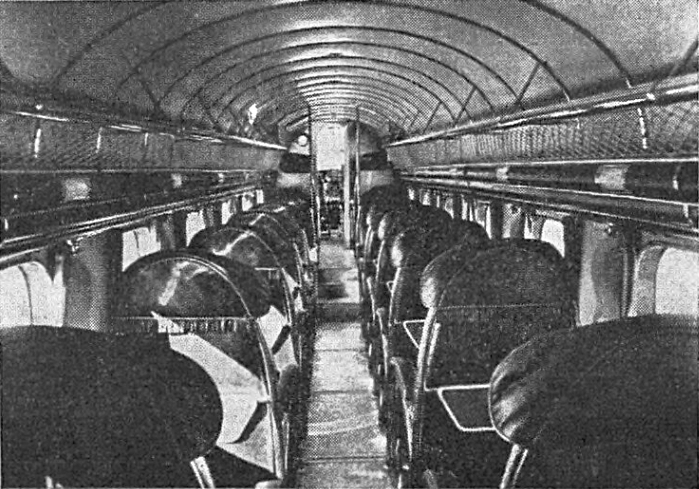
Inside the passenger cabin of a Savoia-Marchetti S.73 (Světozor magazine, 1939)

The day after Wenner's disappearance an anonymous source was quoted in the London tabloid newspaper Daily Mirror,

He was a gifted man and spoke eight languages. He was also a good musician, naturalist, and a keen sportsman...I have known him entertain to dinner an English peer, the Prime Minister of Iceland, and officials of the Portuguese government, but he rarely talked about these people. He hated Hitler and all dictators and was terribly grieved when Italy conquered Abyssinia, for he was a keen supporter of the League of Nations. While he was so upset over the loss of his wife, I feel there is something more behind his death.

The Mirror also reported that Wenner's itinerary in Germany was secret.

=== Discovery ===
On 8 January, Wenner's body was discovered "in the forests of Terboekt in Genk" in the Belgian province of Limburg. According to the article written by Belgian researcher Alex Marut, Wenner's body was found at 50.935606°N 5.539003°E:

A single lantern lit the way of the searchers for what might have been a badly battered corpse. And then it suddenly lay before us, as in a quiet sleep: the eyelids half open, the arms stretched out beside the body, the garments thrown a little from the body, but in no way torn or soiled. The lantern-light shone miserably on the somewhat pale but clean-shaven face of the well-dressed fifty-year-old Englishman. He was neatly clothed in a greyish sports suit, modern brown shirt with white collar, brown silk scarf, colored socks and shiny black shoes. Nothing was damaged on the clothing. Only the buttons of the coat had been torn off, and the collar seemed to have torn slightly loose...On Saturday, January 21, 2012, Gerard Vanalken had a conversation with Louisa Bijnens Terboekt, about the incident 75 years ago: 'I still remember well how in January 1937 a horse with a cart and thereupon a coffin came from the Terboekt woods. It was a cold winter and the unpaved dirt road was hard and frozen...A certain Konings would later find a box with a ring.'

A special correspondent of the London Daily Herald reporting from Tongres, Belgium reported that Wenner's body was found in possession of a still-ticking eight-day watch, his birth certificate (stating that he was born 1887 in Manchester), his wife's death certificate, £75 in bills, and a letter in "fine, clear handwriting with no suggestion of haste" to Büchsenschütz, to whom he wrote, "Dear Olga—Thank you very much. You have been very kind to me. Without you I would have missed the plane." Another report said it was £65 and two letters, "one of which had not been completed." Per the Belgian researchers, Wenner's papers included a marriage permit. A New Zealand paper added that his passport was also accounted for and that all of his papers had been taken into custody of the local magistrate in charge. According to Belgian authorities there was no evidence of wounds received prior to the body falling through the tree cover and landing in the woods. A gendarme returned to the site where Wenner's body landed and found a "box with gold pieces" on approximately 12 January. According to a Belgian newspaper report on 13 January, suicide or accident were both unlikely; the paper speculated that someone familiar with Max Wenner's travel plans had hidden in a compartment in the tail of the plane. When Wenner went back to the lavatory he was injected with something that sedated or weakened him. After a brief struggle, the unknown assailant opened the exterior door and pushed him to his death. A New Zealand paper testified, "Experiments have been carried out with the airliner from which he fell to see if it were possible to fall accidentally, and these have shown that it is extremely difficult to open an outside door of the aircraft by mistake." As for the suicide theory, in addition to Wenner's active plans for a forthcoming wedding, "The housekeeper at Batchcott Hall says that before leaving home Wenner told her to have dinner ready to-night unless she heard to the contrary." In favor of a suicide theory, Wenner's cook-housekeeper Miss E.C. Humphrey told a newspaper that Wenner had been unwell since the death of his wife and that "for some time his nerves had been bad."

=== Autopsy ===
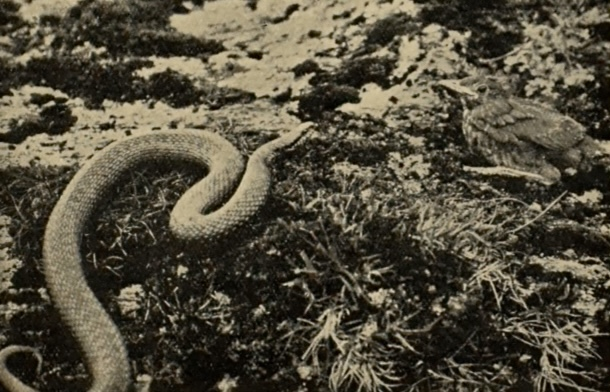
Common viper advancing on a nestling ring ouzel; photo taken by Max Wenner in June 1932 (British Birds magazine)

According to the medical examiner, "Nothing, absolutely nothing, was broken and bruised on the corpse, and the victim bore only a few scratches on the forehead from the fall against the pine boughs...Dr. Chineau's examination revealed that Wenner had landed alive on the floor and died there of suffocation. Fourteen hundred meters he had soared through the air and he was still fully conscious when he landed." The coroner determined the cause of death was suffocation but Belgian broadcaster VBT recently interviewed a medical examiner who found that conclusion a bit odd: "Doctor Wim Van de Voorde regularly performs autopsies for the Limburg prosecutor's office. He believes his colleague drew curious conclusions in 1937. 'It is decided that it would be death by suffocation, which is very doubtful after a fall of 1,400 meters,' says Dr Van de Voorde at an autopsy table. 'Now we would conduct the investigation completely differently.'"

=== Investigation ===
The Belgian authorities seem to have determined that Wenner's death was an unsolvable cold case by spring of 1937. The contemporary Belgian researchers, however, came up with several suspects, including Wenner's German fiancée's brothers, who were said to be ardent Nazis and opposed to the match with a Briton, Wenner's siblings who stood to inherit his fortune, and the Gestapo. According to vrt.be, "Secret German police followed Wenner during his last stay in Cologne until he boarded the plane he fell out of. The pilot of the plane himself also had great Nazi sympathies, because a short time later he made it to hauptsturmführer with the SS."

Telegraf, a Czech-language weekly newspaper published in the Washington, D.C.–Baltimore metropolitan area in the United States, asserted in February 1937 that there was no mystery: Wenner was pushed. The following is a machine translation made by Google Lens:

On the Cologne-Brussels route, a Brit fell out of the plane. They claimed that he committed suicide and jumped out of the plane himself. Now his corpse was found on the Belgian-German border, and in the meantime interesting things about him were revealed. He was an agent of the British secret service and also in the service of the German police. In England, he had a luxurious villa in Bath-Scouthill [recte Batchcott Hall] and in it a laboratory where he conducted experiments in his spare time. In Essen, he had a bride, Olga Buchsenschutz, a private secretary in a large German industrial concern. She declared that Wenner definitely did not commit suicide...Apparently someone on the plane helped him when it was revealed that he was working for the British Secret Service.

=== Estate ===
According to the probate register the effects of Wenner's estate were £32,835 (equivalent to about £1,934,000 in 2025). (Note: To be specific, the listed amount was £32835 8s. 8d. The pre-decimalisation shillings and pence tally out to an additional £0.43.) According to a newspaper report, Wenner's estate was worth £250,000 (equivalent to about £14,700,000 in 2025). He had recently written a codicil that left £2,000 (equivalent to about £118,000 in 2025) to Büchsenschütz, with the remainder to be divided between his brothers, Capt. Alfred Wenner and Mr. Charles Wenner, and his sister, an artist living in the United States, Baroness Violet Wenner. Wenner left the manor of Church Stretton to his "friend and agent William Humphrey, of Stiperstones and later of Walcot" and from Humphrey's estate the land—recognized as an Area of Outstanding Natural Beauty (AONB)—was ultimately conveyed to the National Trust in 1965. (William Humphrey was the father of Wenner's cook-housekeeper Miss E.C. Humphrey.)

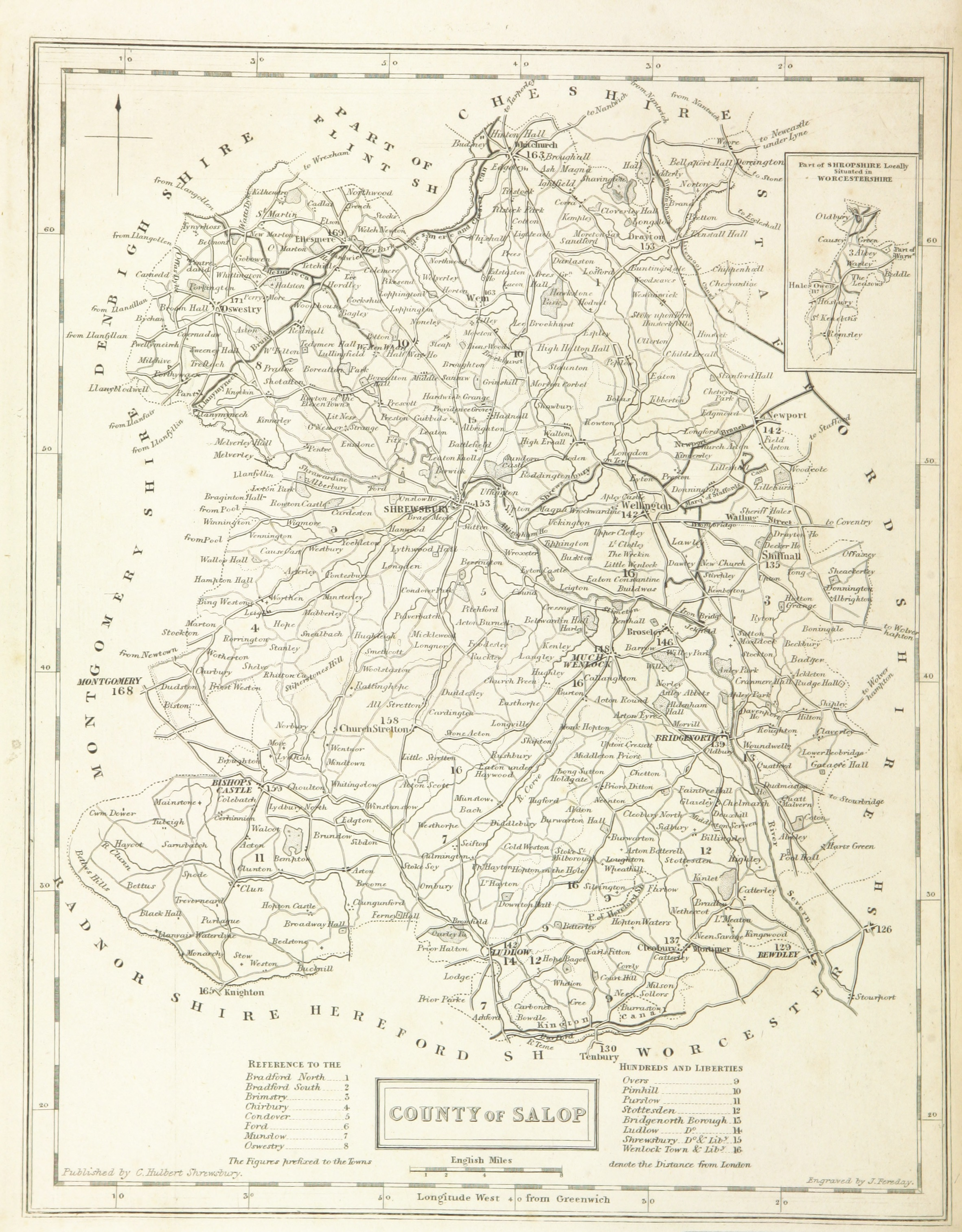
1837 map of Shropshire showing Church Stretton and Stiperstones in the bottom left quadrant (British Library)

=== Burial ===
Max Wenner, age 49, was buried in the municipal cemetery of Genk. His brother Capt. Alfred Wenner was present at the service. A nurse from Wenner's hometown of Manchester who had married a Genk townsman spoke at the funeral because it was thought that she would be most able to speak fluently in English at the service. His grave marker can be found at "in the first row on the right, behind the honorary park of the veterans, in a small plot H" at Genk Municipal Cemetery (Begraafplaats Genk Centrum) on the Hoogstrat road.

=== Aftermath ===
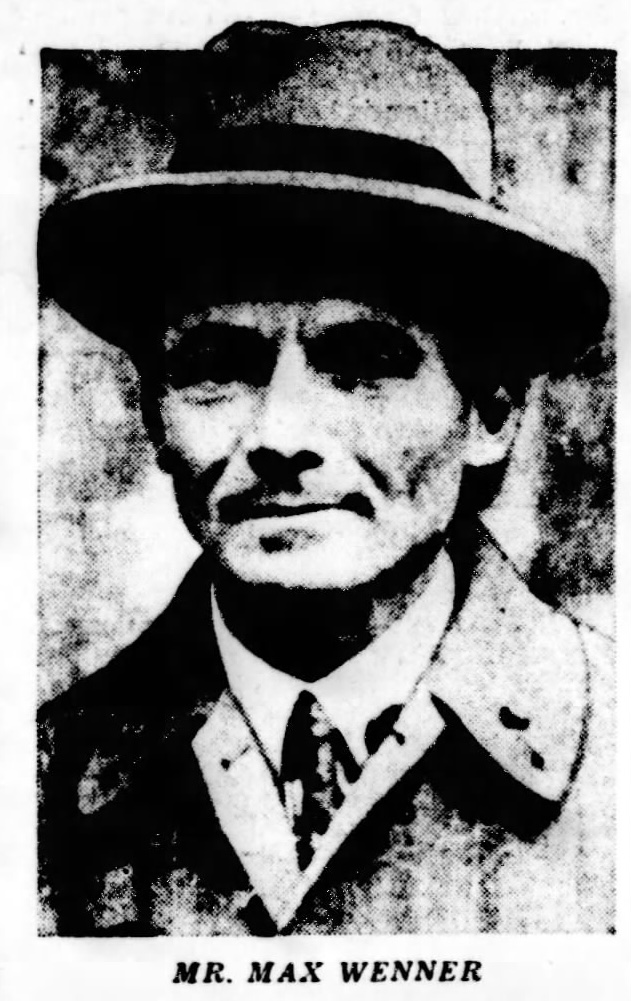
Max Wenner portrait distributed to newspapers after his death (Daily Herald, London)

Wenner's brother claimed to believe that Max Wenner's death was an accident: "The captain indignantly denied any suggestion that his brother was engaged in any political activity which would make him a 'marked man' by Nazi agents. 'He was a country squire who had no interest in politics.'"

On 10 January 1937, six days after Wenner's final flight, a 22-year-old native of Cologne known as Herr Kruft fell 1,220 m (4,000 ft) to his death from an airliner travelling from Düsseldorf. Herr Kruft landed near the village of Pesch minutes before the airliner landed at Cologne. Agricultural workers observed the body of Kruft falling out of the sky; his remains were found 4.8 km (3.0 mi) outside of the city. It was noted that pesch means bad luck in German. (More accurately pech—rather than pesch—is German for "bad luck".)

Wenner's death was reported 10 days after the fact in the Icelandic newspaper Fálkinn, with a headline that translated to "A British friend of Iceland has died":

For the past 5 years, Wenner has been here on land fishing for salmon, either in Grímsá or at Stórhöfði in Borgarfjörður, which he rented. He was known all over the country for his skill with salmon and was one of the best sportsmen in Britain. He loved this country and people very much and wanted to do everything for Icelanders. Many people in this country will miss a friend instead...he had two good Icelandic horses on his farm, which he used daily. Mr. Wenner had planned to come here this summer, as he had done recently. There is still no information on how this tragic accident happened."

A newspaper article from March 1937 about the search for the missing airliner carrying Charles Wolley-Dod noted that in that case Sabena aircraft "patrolled the line usually taken by airliners to Cologne. This part of the [Belgian-German] frontier is sparsely inhabited. It is recalled that it was near this area that the body of Max Wenner, the Shropshire landowner, who fell from a Cologne to Brussels airliner lay for missing for four days in January."

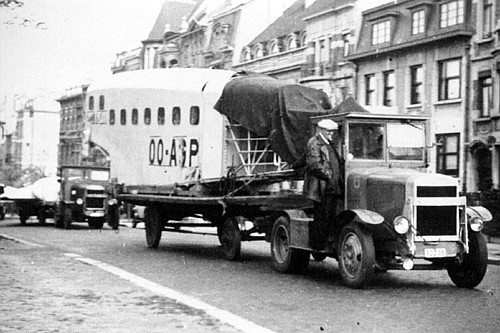
Sabena airplane OO-AGP dismantled for transport on flatbed truck, date unknown (Sierra Bravo Aeropictures, "Coll SBAP")

According to the Belgian researchers, "It is also strange that the Sabena aircraft Savoia-Marchetti S.73 with registration number OO-AGP, shortly after the German invasion of Belgium, was dismantled by the Germans on 16 May 1940 and taken away to an unknown destination. After the war, in 1946 Sabena had to have the registration of the aircraft canceled because the aircraft could not be found." The Flight Safety Foundation citing World Airline Crashes (1996) by Terry Denham says it was "damaged on the ground...destroyed to avoid capture by German forces" on 14 May 1940.

Belgian researcher Alex Marut also writes about the pilot of the flight, Albert Lassois:

About the Belgian pilot of the aforementioned Sabena plane, there is yet more to say. Albert Lassois (nicknamed Albert "the poor") left Sabena in 1937, following the Wenner incident. He became adjutant aviator in the reserves with the 1st regiment in the Belgian Congo, where he joined his fellow Lièger, the pilot Léon Closset. Closset had served October 1934 to June 1937 as a reserve pilot in the Force Publique in the Congo. Both received mention starting September 1940 in espionage dossiers as German agents, but then joined the Walloon Legion voluntarily in July 1941. Closset eventually received the rank of Commandant of Laborers (commandant van de Waalse) for his service; Lassois entered as a sergeant but by June 1943 transferred to the 5th Wallonian brigade of the Waffen-SS as a lieutenant. He concluded his military career in April 1945 with the rank of Hauptsturmführer and died 11 Oct 1968.

== Legacy ==
Wenner's community, in the following years and decades, described his demise as a "tragic death" (1938) and an "air accident" (1965).

Max Wenner had several observations and photographs published in British Birds magazine, as well as at least one article published in the sporting magazine The Field, on the behavior of stoats. Wenner's documented observation in 1911 of a tree pipit was recorded in the Proceedings of the Isle of Man Natural History and Antiquarian Society in 1925; in the early 1930s, in the Hungarian bird journal Aquila, Jakab Schenk cited a "lake loon" nest collection made by Wenner in 1914; his photo of a nesting horned grebe appeared alongside a 1951 Icelandic magazine article by Björn J. Blöndal; and his unpublished bird journal was cited in 1968 in an article on health issues of oystercatchers.

In 1943, Malcolm Saville published Mystery at Witchend, the first book in what would become the long-running Lone Pine juvenile fiction series. The plot involves children evacuated from London during the war and sent to the Shropshire countryside, where they meet Petronella, the lonely daughter of the cantankerous widower who lives at Hatchholt Hall. Together the children explore the wilds of the Long Mynd and ultimately confront Nazi saboteurs. According to the history of Batchcott Hall, the tale of Max Wenner may have been a partial inspiration for the plot of Mystery at Witchend.

Max's brother Alfred E. Wenner died in 1969, and his sister Violet B. Wenner died in 1970. Max Wenner's nephew, Michael A. Wenner (1921–2020), son of Alfred E. and Simone Marguerite (Roussel) Wenner, included some biographical detail on Max in his own 1993 memoir So It Was. Michael Wenner was a "scholar, paratrooper, commando" and diplomat who served as British ambassador to El Salvador; he was also the last surviving veteran of the 151/156 Parachute Battalion of the British Army of World War II. Max's great-nephew and Michael's son Christopher Wenner (1954–2021), also known as Max Stahl, was a notable documentary filmmaker and television presenter.

== See also ==
- British avifauna
  - List of birds of Great Britain
  - British Birds Rarities Committee
