= Castle Bank (castle) =

Motte-and-bailey castle in Woolstaston, Shropshire

Coordinates: 52.58063°N 2.81282°W

Castle Bank is a medieval motte-and-bailey castle, found 150 m (490 ft) north-west from Woolstaston Hall in Woolstaston, Shropshire (grid reference SO450985).

== Remains ==
All that remains of Castle Bank are the earthworks for the motte and bailey, which have been partially destroyed by the construction of a reservoir at the northern edge of the bailey. The motte itself is nearly 30 ft (9.1 m) diameter across the summit point, which stands at 10 ft (3.0 m) above the ditch which surrounds it. This surrounding ditch is 2 ft (0.61 m) deep on the north-east edge, although it has disappeared almost everywhere else. The bailey, which keeps to the shape of the motte, is defined by a 6 ft (1.8 m) tall scarp.

Excavations done in 1965 unearthed an abundance of ceramic pottery, all of which was dated to somewhere between 1200 – 1300, suggesting that Castle Bank was at least occupied during this period. Alongside this, a post hole was also found on the outer lip of what remains of the ditch, likely belonging to the bailey palisade. Due to the absence of later pottery, it has been inferred that the castle itself was likely abandoned sometime during the early 14th century, although it has been noted that the surrounding ditch likely remained opened until it was deliberately filled in the early 17th century.

== Heritage status ==
Castle Bank is designated as a scheduled monument, being first listed on 16 December 1974.

== See also ==
- Castles in Great Britain and Ireland
- List of castles in England
