= Violet B. Wenner =

Anglo-American artist (~1884–1970)

Violet Beatrice Wenner
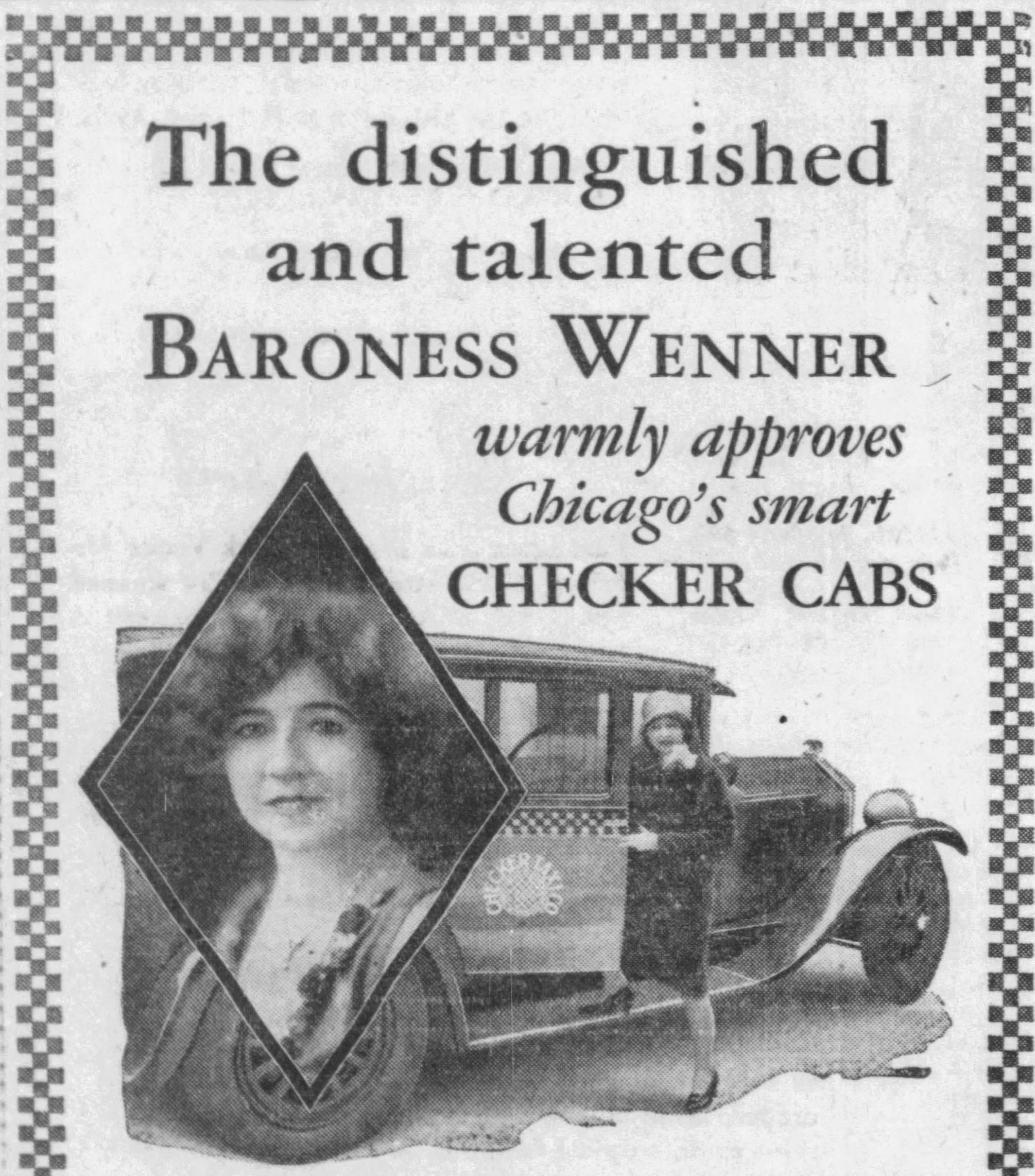
- Baroness Wenner endorsement for Checker Cabs, 1929
- Born: Manchester, England, UK
- Spouse: Baron Adolf von Sternenfels (1911–1920, divorced)
- Relatives: Max Wenner, Christopher Wenner

Baroness Violet Beatrice Wenner (1884 – December 7, 1970) was an English-American artist known for her portraiture. She painted a wide range of prominent individuals, including crowned heads of Europe, American politicians, scientists and industrialists.

== Biography ==
Wenner was born in the first quarter (January, February or March) of 1884 in Manchester, England, to a Swiss father Alfred Wenner and his Austrian-born second wife Malvine Egloff and grew up on The Hill near Alderley Edge, Cheshire. Her brother was Max Wenner. In later life, she made a wide array of claims about the specific year of her birth within the 1880s.

Wenner had an exhibit of her work at Pisco's Gallery in Vienna in about 1908. Wenner, who studied with Sir Walter Crane in England, and Heinrich von Angeli in Vienna, in Munich and in Paris, was also said to be a talented harpist.

Wenner was married in 1911 near the family home in Alderley Edge to a captain of the Ulanen and gentleman in waiting to the King of Württemberg, Adolf Conrad von Sternenfels, Baron Von Sternenfels. Von Sternenberg was elsewhere described as adjutant general to the king of Battenberg.

The couple divorced (Note: Photographs and some records belonging to one "Sternenfels, Adolf von, Freiherr [Baron]" are online at the Baden-Württemberg state archive.) in approximately 1920 and the Baroness moved to the United States in 1922, where she became a naturalized citizen in 1931. She acknowledged that her U.S. citizenship made her title null and void but nonetheless she was always referred to in print as Baroness Wenner. Wenner spent some time in New York but primarily lived and worked primarily in Chicago, Illinois. Her residence of many years was the Italian Court Building at 619 N. Michigan on the Magnificent Mile. A suitcase stolen from the vestibule of her apartment in 1940 contained US$3,500 (equivalent to about $78,550 in 2024) of jewelry, including a platinum bracelet set with diamonds and sapphire, and a string of pearls. When the Italian Court Building was due to be demolished in the late 1960s, she moved to the St. Clair Hotel. She had a large collection of crystal and porcelain objects of the Napoleon III period that she sold to a Florida museum.

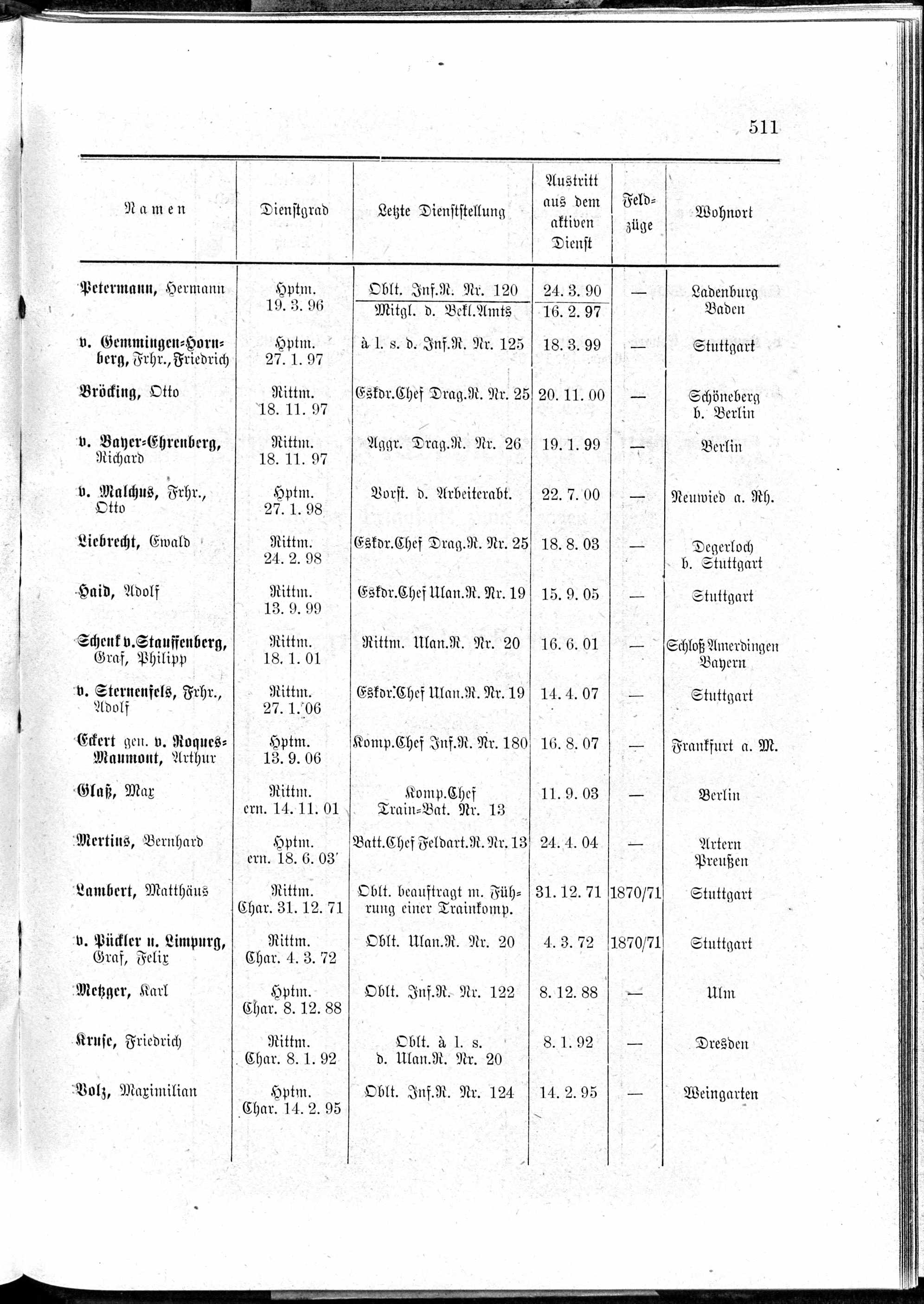
Wenner's then-future husband Adolf v Sternenfels Frhr in a German military directory published 1907, listed immediately below a relation of Claus von Stauffenberg

Wenner painted Col. George A. Whiting, Allan Mowbray, Mrs. Ossip Gabrilowitch, Kaiser Wilhelm, "the great scientist Eugene Steinbach" [Eugen Steinach?], Bishop Charles Palmerston Anderson, Amy Leslie, the Duchess of Teck and her children, Count Ferdinand Zeppelin, the queen of Württemberg, King William II of Württemberg, Governor Len Small of Illinois, Professor Steinmetz, Otto H. Kahn, Harold F. McCormick, William Hohenzollern, Emperor Franz Joseph, Franklin Roosevelt, Eleanor Roosevelt, Herbert Hoover, Clara Clemens, Maria Jeritza, and Charles Curtis. Baroness Wenner worked in oils, pastels, charcoal, and pen and ink.

== See also ==
- Max Wenner, her younger brother
- German-language Wikipedia: Alphabetical list of Swabian noble families - S
