= Listed buildings in Smethcott =

Smethcott is a civil parish in Shropshire, England. It contains 21 listed buildings that are recorded in the National Heritage List for England. Of these, one is listed at Grade II*, the middle of the three grades, and the others are at Grade II, the lowest grade. The parish contains the villages of Smethcott, Betchcott, and Picklescott, and is otherwise rural. The listed buildings consist of houses, farmhouses and farm buildings and associated structures, a public house, and a church.

== Key ==
Grade	Criteria
II*	Particularly important buildings of more than special interest
II	Buildings of national importance and special interest

== Buildings ==
Name and location	Photograph	Date	Notes	Grade
New Hall Farmhouse; 52.60390°N 2.80357°W	—	Early to mid 16th century	The farmhouse was extended in about 1600, and rebuilt and remodelled in the 19th century. It is partly timber framed with brick nogging and partly in brick, and has a tile roof. There is an L-shaped plan, with a two-bay range, and a later two-bay range at right angles. The brick porch has a stone-coped pedimented gable, the doorway has a four-part rectangular fanlight, and the windows are casements.	II
Barn and cartshed, Hall Farm; 52.59043°N 2.83543°W	—	16th century	The building was altered in the 19th century. It is timber framed with cruck construction on a red sandstone plinth, and with weatherboarding. It is partly rebuilt in red brick, and has a corrugated iron roof. The barn has three bays and contains boarded doors, and the later cowshed to the right has two bays. Inside are four full cruck trusses.	II
Middle Farmhouse; 52.58205°N 2.83376°W		Mid 16th century (probable)	The farmhouse was altered and extended in the 18th and 19th centuries. It has a timber framed core, and is encased in red brick, partly rendered, and has tile roofs. There is one storey and an attic, a two-bay range, a two-bay cross-wing to the left, and a gabled brick rear wing. The doorway has a segmental head, the windows are casements, and there are two gabled semi-dormers.	II
Cow house, Middle Farm; 52.58212°N 2.83396°W	—	16th century (probable)	A barn, later a cow house, it was altered and extended in the 17th and 19th centuries. It is timber framed with cruck construction on a red sandstone plinth with weatherboarding, and has been partly rebuilt in red sandstone and red brick, and has a tile roof. There are three bays, and it contains various openings. Inside there are two full cruck trusses.	II
The Bynords; 52.59387°N 2.80894°W	—	Mid to late 16th century	The house was altered in the 19th and 20th centuries. It is in rendered timber framing, partly refaced, rebuilt and extended in painted brick, and with a tile roof. There are two storeys and a partial semi-basement, a range of three bays, and a 19th-century rear wing with a lean-to in the angle. The windows are casements.	II
Coppice Farmhouse; 52.60602°N 2.82186°W	—	Late 16th century	The farmhouse was altered and extended in the 17th and 19th centuries. It is timber framed with brick nogging on a sandstone plinth, it has been partly rebuilt and extended in painted and rendered sandstone and brick, and has slate roofs. The farmhouse is party in one storey and an attic, and partly in two storeys. It consists of a two-bay original range, with two 17th-century gabled wings at the front, and a 19th-century gabled wing at the rear. Between the wings is a timber-framed porch and a doorway with a moulded architrave, the windows are casements, and there is a small staircase window.	II
Hall Farmhouse; 52.59030°N 2.83553°W	—	Late 16th century	The farmhouse has been altered and partly rebuilt. It is timber framed with red brick nogging on a high sandstone plinth, partly clad in metal sheeting, largely rebuilt in brick and sandstone, and partly rendered. It has a tile roof, two storeys, and an H-shaped plan consisting of a two-bay hall range and projecting two-bay cross-wings. At the rear is a stair turret in the angle of the western cross-wing. There is a porch with a hipped roof, the windows are casements, and there is an eyebrow dormer.	II
Bank Farmhouse and farm buildings 52.58980°N 2.83285°W	—	Early to mid 17th century	The farmhouse was remodelled and extended in the 18th century. It has a timber framed core, and is encased in red sandstone with red brick dressings, a dentilled eaves cornice, and a tile roof. The house has two storeys and three bays. The doorway has a moulded architrave and a lean-to porch, and the windows are casements, those in the ground floor with segmental heads. To the right is a cowhouse with a blocked loft door in the gable end, and to the left is a lower later cowhouse partly incorporated into the house.	II
Stone House; 52.58989°N 2.83592°W	—	Early to mid 17th century	A farmhouse, later a private house, that has been altered and extended. It is in red sandstone with dressings in grey sandstone, and has a tile roof. There is one storey and an attic, and a T-shaped plan, consisting of a main range, a two-bay gabled cross-wing to the left, and a 20th-century extension recessed to the left. The windows vary, and include square windows, a mullioned window with a hood mould and datestone above, and casement windows. Inside there are timber framed cross walls.	II
Cow house, Hall Farm; 52.59051°N 2.83527°W	—	17th century	A granary, later a cow house, it is timber framed with red brick nogging, and has been partly rebuilt in red sandstone. It has a corrugated iron roof, and two bays.	II
Standish Cottage; 52.59010°N 2.83200°W	—	Mid 17th century	A farmhouse, later a private house, that has been altered and extended. It is timber framed with brick nogging, partly rendered and partly rebuilt and extended in painted sandstone and brick. The house has one storey and an attic, and a tile roof. It consists of a hall range of one bay and a later bay to the right, and a projecting two-bay gabled cross-wing to the left. The windows are casements, and there are three raking dormers.	II
The Bottle and Glass Public House; 52.59016°N 2.83501°W		Mid 17th century	A house, later a public house, it has been altered and extended. The public house is timber framed with brick nogging, the front and side walls have been rebuilt and the building extended in painted sandstone with brick dressings, and the roof is tiled. There is one storey and an attic, three bays, with an extension to the west, and a 20th-century flat-roofed extension to the rear. The doorway has a segmental head, the windows are casements with segmental heads, and there are four gabled eaves dormers.	II
Barn, Underhill Hall; 52.60273°N 2.84324°W	—	Mid 17th century	The barn, which was altered later, is timber framed with red brick nogging, some rebuilding in red sandstone with red brick dressings, the left gable end has weatherboarding, and there is a corrugated iron roof. The barn has three bays, and it contains two doorways, one blocked, six casement windows, and three pitching holes.	II
Barns west of Standish Cottage; 52.59012°N 2.83238°W	—	Mid to late 17th century	The barns are timber framed with weatherboarding and corrugated iron roofs. They have an L-shaped plan consisting of a three-bay barn and a single-bay barn forming a wing at the south. The barns contain doorways, including inserted garage doors, and external steps lead to a loft door in the gable end.	II
Barn, pump and trough, New Hall Farm; 52.60406°N 2.80417°W	—	c. 1700	The barn is timber framed with weatherboarding on a red sandstone plinth, the southeast end wall has been rebuilt in brick, and the roof is tiled. There is an exposed truss in the left gable end. The barn contains doors, loft doors and honeycomb vents. Adjoining the barn are a 19th-century cast iron pump and a grey sandstone trough.	II
Underhill Hall; 52.60275°N 2.84261°W	—	c. 1700	A farmhouse, later a private house, it incorporates a 17th-century core. It is in painted sandstone, with a painted red brick front, a plat band, a dentilled eaves cornice, and a slate roof. There are three storeys, a front of seven bays, and a two-storey rear wing. On the front is a two-storey gabled porch that has a round-arched entrance with panelled piers, moulded imposts, and a moulded architrave. Inside the porch are benches, and the windows are casements.	II*
Jordan House; 52.58974°N 2.83484°W	—	Early to mid 18th century	The cottage is in red sandstone, painted at the front, and has a tile roof. There is one storey and an attic, and two bays. On the front is a gabled porch, the doorway has a segmental head, the windows are casements with segmental heads, and there are two gabled eaves dormers.	II
The Gatehouse; 52.58992°N 2.83462°W	—	Early to mid 18th century	A cottage, at one time an inn, possibly incorporating earlier material. It is in painted sandstone with brick dressings, a dentilled eaves cornice, and a tile roof. There is one storey and an attic, and three bays. The windows are casements, and there are three gabled semi-dormers.	II
Parish House; 52.59491°N 2.82274°W		Mid to late 18th century (probable)	Originally squatters' cottages, they possibly incorporate an earlier core. They consist of a row of three cottages in painted sandstone with a thatched roof. The cottages have one storey and an attic, and each cottage has one bay. The windows are casements, and there is an eyebrow dormer.	II
Church of St. Michael and All Angels; 52.58940°N 2.81415°W		1849–50	The church was rebuilt on the site of an earlier church incorporating 12th-century material. It is in red sandstone with dressings in grey sandstone, and a tile roof with ridge cresting. The church is in Decorated style, and consists of a nave and a chancel in one cell, and a south porch. At the west end is a timber framed bellcote, with copper sheathing in the lower part, lattice openings, and a tented pyramidal copper cap with a weathervane. The 12th-century incorporated material includes the tympana of the nave north doorway, the priest's doorway in the chancel, and a north window in the chancel.	II
Pump, New Hall Farm; 52.60397°N 2.80351°W	—	Mid to late 19th century	The pump, which is to the north of the farmhouse, is in painted cast iron. It has a fluted circular shaft with a spout, a fluted top with a double-curved handle, and a fluted domed cap with a spike finial.	II
