= Lalage Bown =

English educator (1927–2021)

Lalage Bown OBE FRSE FAcSS
- Born: Lalage Jean Bown; 1 April 1927; Croydon, England
- Died: 17 December 2021 (aged 94); Shrewsbury, England
- Education: Wycombe Abbey School, Cheltenham Ladies' College, Somerville College, Oxford
- Occupation: Educator
- Known for: Adult education leadership, feminism, decolonisation

Lalage Jean Bown OBE FRSE FAcSS (23 May 1927 – 17 December 2021) was an English educator, feminist and women's literacy advocate.

== Biography ==
The eldest of the four children of Dorothy Ethel Watson and Arthur Mervyn Bown, an Indian Civil Servant who worked in Burma (now Myanmar), Lalage Bown was born in Croydon, south London, on 23 May 1927, and she grew up in Shropshire at Woolstaston. She was educated at Wycombe Abbey School and at Cheltenham Ladies' College, and went on to earn a bachelor's degree in modern history and a MA from the University of Oxford where she studied at Somerville College. Bown also took post-graduate studies in adult education and economic development.

== Career ==
In 1974, Bown became a Commonwealth Visiting Professor at the University of Edinburgh and then went to Ghana, where she taught at the University College of the Gold Coast in Ghana. Later she taught at Makerere University College in Uganda, the University of Ibadan and Ahmadu Bello University in Nigeria, the University of Zambia and the University of Lagos. She played an important role in establishing adult education and literacy programmes in the UK and in Africa. She was the founding secretary of the African Adult Education Association and of the Nigerian National Council for Adult Education (NNCAE) Bown was the first organizing secretary of the International Congress of Africanists. In 1973, she published Two Centuries of African English, which became an important resource for African universities.

Bown returned to the United Kingdom in 1981 and became head of the Department of Adult and Continuing Education at the University of Glasgow. After retirement she settled in Shrewsbury, where she was an active Rotarian.

Bown died on 17 December 2021, aged 94, at the Royal Shrewsbury Hospital, having had a fall at home. Her funeral took place at Emstrey Crematorium, Shrewsbury, on 28 January 2022. Her ashes were scattered in the churchyard at Woolstaston.

== Work in adult education ==
Bown's impact on teaching, and specifically adult education was significant and longstanding across her career. In her first teaching post she challenged the faculty to re-think the content of their curriculum suggesting that it was important for African students to encounter writing by and about African people. her 1973 book, Two Centuries of African English features writing by Ignatius Sancho, Olaudah Equiano, Jomo Kenyatta, Julius Nyerere and Chinua Achebe.

She was a passionate advocate for women's literacy, and she said that "even the simplest acquisition of literacy can have a profoundly empowering effect personally, socially and politically. When it comes to women, there is a huge change in their self-worth and confidence."

Her Handbook of Adult Education for West Africa established a starting point for wider discussions about the scope of adult education beyond basic literacy. One reviewer noted that the "most important aspect of this book, however, is probably that it was written at all. One hopes that it will stimulate other Third World scholars to further develop their own adult education literatures based upon their own cultural systems. This is an excellent beginning."

A special issue of Adult Education in Nigeria in 1997 hailed her as "the mother of Adult Education in Africa".

Her work in social activism and de-colonisation of the curriculum continued in Scotland Under her leadership University of Glasgow department for Continuing Education offered one of the largest programmes in the UK. In 1990, she established an Equal Opportunities Training Unit to provide training for the police and Glasgow District Council. She was widely regarded as a leading speaker and representative of adult education in the UK and maintained a high profile internationally.

== Honours and awards ==
In 1975, she was awarded an honorary doctorate by the Open University. In 2002, she received an honorary DLitt from the University of Glasgow. She used the opportunity to urge the university to strengthen its service to adult learners who wanted access university knowledge, but not always necessarily to study for a full degree.

She received the William Pearson Tolley Award from Syracuse University in 1975, the first woman to receive that award. She was named an Officer the Order of the British Empire in 1977. She was also named a fellow of the Educational Institute of Scotland. Bown was named a fellow of the Royal Society of Edinburgh in 1991. She was awarded an honorary doctorate from the University of Chester in 2018.

Bown was inducted into the International Hall of Fame for Adult and Continuing Education in 2009 and was joint deputy executive chair of the Council for Education in the Commonwealth from 1999 to 2006.

Bown received the Distinguished Africanist Award from the African Studies Association of the United Kingdom (ASAUK).

By those who met Bown she was known as "a woman of sartorial flair". A collection of her clothes was donated to the Victoria and Albert Museum in response to the Africa Fashion call-out in 2022. The collection includes busuuti made of Barkcloth and boubou designed by Shade Thomas-Fahm.

In April 2024, a one-day conference in Bown's honour, entitled "Education for All: Challenging Orthodoxies and Fostering Inclusion", inspired by and exploring her work, took place at Somerville College, Oxford.
