= Woolstaston =

Village in Shropshire, England

Coordinates: 52.580°N 2.809°W

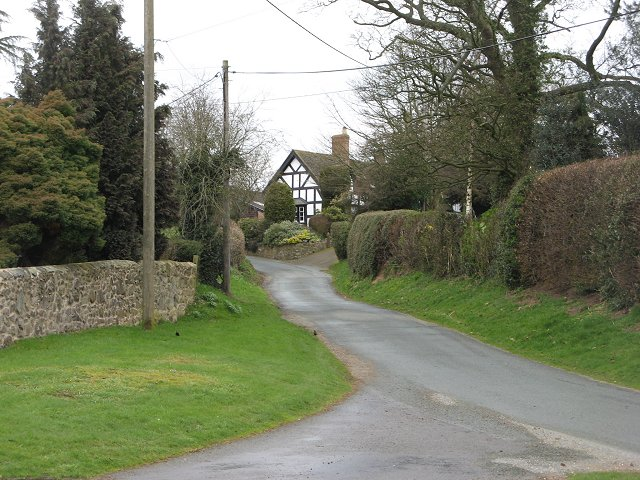
- Woolstaston village

- Location within Shropshire
- OS grid reference: SO451983
- Civil parish: Woolstaston
- Unitary authority: Shropshire
- Ceremonial county: Shropshire
- Region: West Midlands
- Country: England
- Sovereign state: United Kingdom
- Post town: CHURCH STRETTON
- Postcode district: SY6
- Dialling code: 01694
- Police: West Mercia
- Fire: Shropshire
- Ambulance: West Midlands
- UK Parliament: Shrewsbury and Atcham

Woolstaston is a small village and civil parish in Shropshire, England, south of Shrewsbury and north of the nearest town, Church Stretton.

It is located in the northern foothills of the Long Mynd and is situated near Leebotwood, Smethcott and Picklescott. The parish is geographically very small, covering only the village, the lanes leading to it and a small part of the Walkmills area to the north-east. The area also contains the Rectory Farm Bed & Breakfast.

The village has a Church of England parish church dedicated to St Michael, dating to the 13th century but restored in its present form in 1864-65 when a transept, vestry and bell turret were added.

To the north-west side of the village, there is an earthworks, which are the remains of Castle Bank, a medieval motte-and-bailey castle that was occupied sometime during the 12th to 13th century, and which was abandoned during the early 14th century. The northern edge of the bailey is destroyed, due to a reservoir being built on it.

Lalage Bown (1927-2021), educator, feminist and women's literacy advocate in Africa, was brought up in Woolstaston and her ashes were scattered in the churchyard.

== See also ==
- Listed buildings in Woolstaston
