= John Vincent Cain =

Minor British fraudster (1907–1940)

John Vincent Cain (1907 – 7 August 1940) was a British civilian aviator, AWOL soldier, convicted petty criminal, and confidence man who appeared as an unreliable narrator in newspaper coverage of 1930s European international relations. He may (or may not) have been involved in delivering planes and weapons to both sides of the Spanish Civil War. He was also apparently a passenger on the plane from which Max Wenner fell to his death in 1937. He himself committed suicide when about to be arrested in 1940.

== Biography ==
Born in 1907, at Romford, Essex, son of Ernest Harry Cain and his wife Ada Eleanor (née Newman), Cain's schooling in childhood was disturbed by ill-health, he attended a preparatory school from where, aged 12, he was expelled after a sexual incident with one of its masters. He was found another school where at 16 he was reportedly involved in "another unfortunate incident". Cain was reportedly convicted on "false pretences" charges in 1927 at which time he moved to Australia and New Zealand for seven years.

On return to England, his brother Harold Newman Cain employed him within his business as a travelling salesman and he enjoyed some success until he left it in 1936 after losing the confidence of customers through lying and dishonesty. Cain then began a career flying planes from Brooklands to the Continent for £15 a week. He later joined the British army, ending up reportedly as a lance-corporal in the London Scottish Regiment, although the Commonwealth War Graves Commission (CWGC) records him as a private. Between January and April 1937, Cain was, according to himself, involved in providing weapons and planes to Francisco Franco's Nationalists and the opposing Republicans in the ongoing Spanish Civil War. He told the Kingston bankruptcy court in 1938 that "he and another pilot flew American planes from Littoria Aerodrome, Rome, to Spain, where they were sold to the Spanish government and Gen. Franco. He flew other planes from France, but none from England. He was paid by Mr. Drecquer. Cain added that he also took armaments to Spain in a ship chartered by Drecquer at Havre." Cain and Drecquer also allegedly planned to fly films of the coronation of George VI to the United States, with a hoped-for profit of £45,000 (equivalent to about £2,650,350 in 2025), but their plane supposedly crashed during a test so the plan was never carried out. Drecquer, of whom little other record can be found, was described as an American financier or "company promoter." According to Cain, Drecquer committed suicide sometime between 1937 and 1938.

A detailed account from within the Sabena airliner from which Max Wenner fell on 4 January 1937 was provided to a New Zealand newspaper in March 1937 by "Mrs. J. V. Cain, formerly Miss Tinka Jackson, of Devonport, Auckland." Mr. and Mrs. Cain, who then lived at Walton-on-Thames, Surrey, their daughter and nanny were all traveling together that day.

In April 1937, Cain ("an Australian") and a British airman named Ken Waller made the newspaper because they used a speedboat to follow the French ocean liner SS Île de France down Southampton Water and boarded her off the Isle of Wight. They were earlier barred from boarding the ship because "their passports were not visaed for the United States, where they had urgent business."

Cain "was known to many leading fliers as a lavish entertainer." In March 1938 he pleaded guilty in West London Police Court to obtaining almost £300 under "false pretences" by offering shares in Imperial Airways and another company to a businessman but then disappearing without providing the stock certificates. He was sentenced to serve three months in prison per charge, to be served consecutively. Detective-Sergeant Broom told the bankruptcy court in April 1938 that Cain was "so full of deceit he almost deceives himself" and that "this man is extremely fond of luxury and seems unable to adjust his mode of living to his circumstances." In May 1938, he had unpayable debts amounting to £9,130 9s. 11d.

=== Death ===
On 2 August 1940, Cain fled his home at 48 Upper Berkeley Street in west London in a car in company with a woman friend, Edith Leslie Knight, trailed by the police. He drove west into Wales then back into England where they stayed overnight in a hotel at Shrewsbury, Shropshire, on 6-7 August.

On 7 August 1940, they left the hotel and Cain drove the car out of town before forcing Knight to leave the car with him. In the grounds of Ranslett House, a farm at Eaton Constantine, near Shrewsbury, Cain shot himself in the head in front of two police detectives who were coming to investigate why he had told the woman (but not the wife he had in 1937) he was going to shoot her, put her body in the car, and set fire to it. After Cain's public suicide it was reported, "Cain, who was a lance-corporal in a London regiment, had been absent from his unit for some time. Scotland Yard was interested in his recent activities, and Special Branch officers visited the neighbourhood, but it is officially denied that Cain was engaged in espionage." He had told the woman he threatened to kill that, variously, he had an important job with the Air Ministry, he had a dangerous job and thus needed a revolver, two of his friends who were said to have committed suicide were actually killed by German agents, England was presently being invaded on three fronts, he was a German, he had held important machinery (or a set of stolen plans) from Birmingham that had already been sent to Germany, and that he would be flying to Germany soon in a plane hidden in a field or that he needed to go to "an open field in a certain area" where a German plane would pick him up. The inquest into his death was adjourned and held on 9 September 1940 to allow time for Special Branch investigations to be completed.

Cain is buried in the Shrewsbury General Cemetery, in extension Plot 10. His grave is among those which bear a CWGC military headstone that are in a Second World War war graves plot.

== Reputation ==
After his death, one newspaper in Newcastle, New South Wales, Australia, wrote: "Fair-haired and slightly built, Cain always gave the impression of becoming one of the leading air aces, but his ventures came to naught. He was a mystery, even to his closest friends, most of whom had lost touch with him in recent years. Some were astonished to learn he had joined the Army."

A 1946 book called They Came to Spy by Stanley Firmin mentions Cain as an example of "the sort of thing Intelligence officers in Britain had to deal with."

Information reached the Special Branch that a man giving the name John Vincent Cain was travelling the country with a woman and posing as a British Secret Service agent. Two officers were accordingly put on his tail and he was kept under the closest observation. It was noted that he seemed to be possessed of ample funds, stayed at good hotels with his companion and was fond of making long journeys by road, the motive of which was not very clear...The view taken by Scotland Yard was that in view of the information Cain must have gathered during his trips about the countryside it was imperative that the inquest on him be held in camera. Scotland Yard found that he was no secret service man at all but merely an adventurer with a glib tongue and quick and fertile imagination. He had, in fact, served several terms of imprisonment for fraud, and on this latest series of tours had impressed with lively stories of his work as a member of a Government security department. To those who knew anything of the work of British Intelligence these stories were sheer fantastic inventions. Every one of them, however, had to be investigated down to the last detail. And though, as it proved, the investigation was nothing but a waste of time, it was necessary for it to be done before the man could be written off as nothing but a trickster having not even the smallest connection with espionage work.

== See also ==
- Harold Cole
- Fritz Joubert Duquesne
- Sidney Reilly
- Battle of Britain
  - Bristol Blitz
  - Liverpool Blitz
  - London Blitz
  - Hull Blitz
- International response to the Spanish Civil War
