= Smethcott =

Civil parish in Shropshire, England

Coordinates: 52.593°N 2.811°W

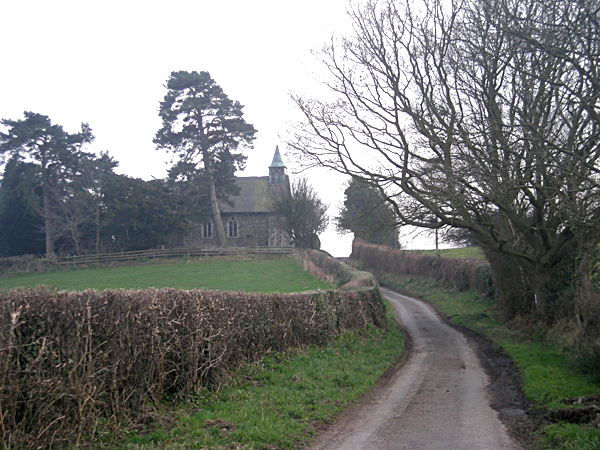
- Smethcott church

- Location within Shropshire
- Population: 254 (2011)
- OS grid reference: SO450998
- Civil parish: Smethcott
- Unitary authority: Shropshire
- Ceremonial county: Shropshire
- Region: West Midlands
- Country: England
- Sovereign state: United Kingdom
- Post town: CHURCH STRETTON
- Postcode district: SY6
- Dialling code: 01694
- Police: West Mercia
- Fire: Shropshire
- Ambulance: West Midlands
- UK Parliament: Shrewsbury and Atcham

Smethcott (sometimes Smethcote) is a civil parish and dispersed hamlet near the village of Picklescott, in Shropshire, England. The population of the civil parish at the 2011 census was 254.

The name Smethcott has an Old English origin, and means "cottage(s) of the smiths". It was listed as a manor in the Domesday Book, where (spelt "Smerecote") it is recorded as having been held by Eldred, the tenant of its former owner Edmund, who now himself held it from a member of the Anglo-Norman nobility. A 13th century motte-and-bailey castle existed at Smethcott, of which now only the earthworks remain in a field near the church. The motte hill rises to an altitude of 247 metres (810 ft).

The church, which is dedicated to St Michael and All Angels, was largely rebuilt in 1850 though retains some Norman features. The parish's war memorial, a stone cross, is in the churchyard and there is also a Roll of Honour inside the church.

The village school closed in 1964 and today the nearest services (pubs, shops, etc.) are found in Picklescott and Leebotwood.

The rural parish is situated in the northern foothills of the Long Mynd and includes Picklescott and the hamlet of Betchcott. The nearest town is Church Stretton. To the south is the village and parish of Woolstaston, with the Betchcott Brook forming the parish boundary.

== See also ==
- Listed buildings in Smethcott
