= Charles Wolley-Dod =

British pilot, aviation executive (1892–1937)

Charles Wolley-Dod OBE
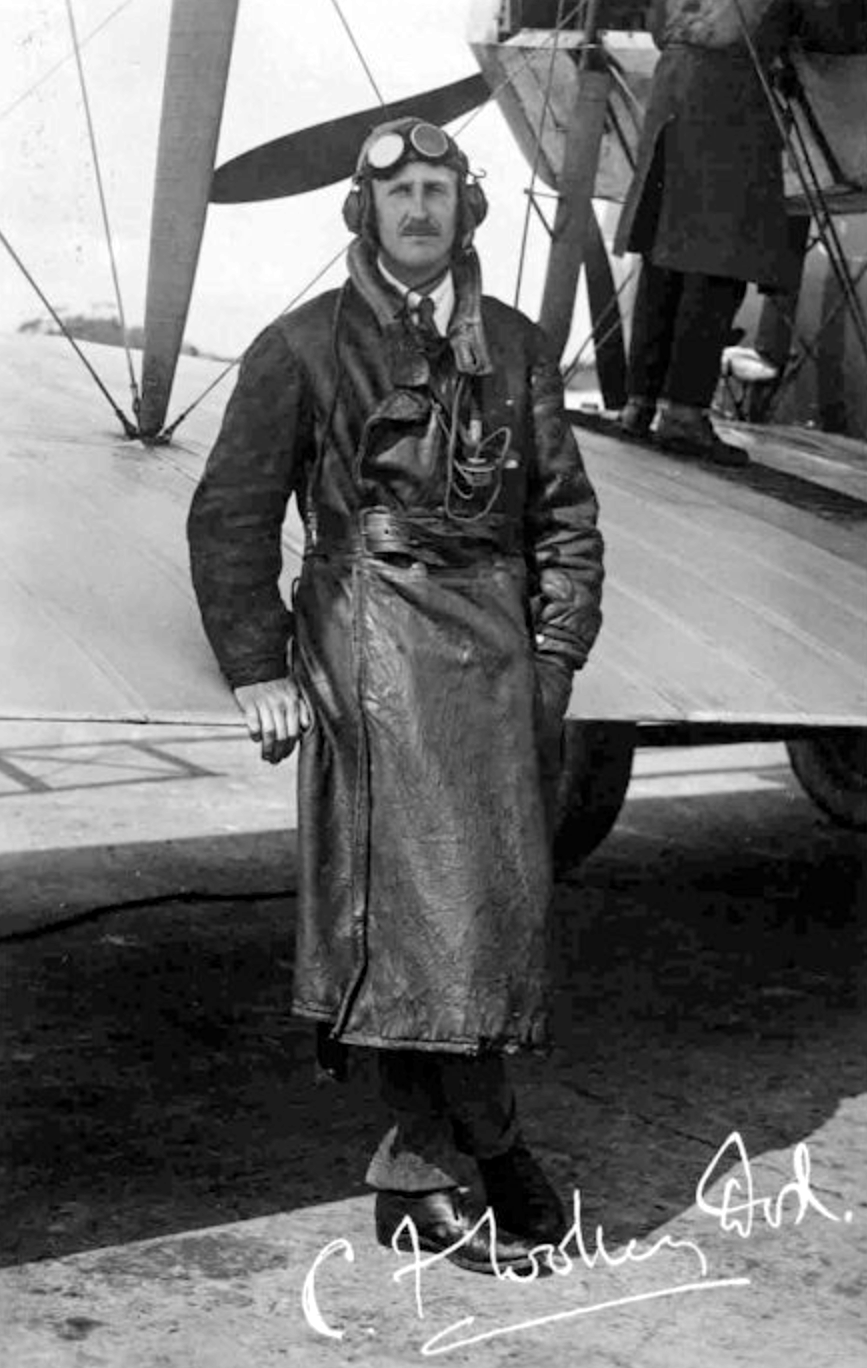
- Born: 25 August 1892; Lahore, Punjab, British India (now Pakistan)
- Died: 15 or 16 March 1937 (aged 44); Elsdorf, Nazi Germany
- Cause of death: Aircraft accident
- Education: Rugby School
- Known for: First planned civilian flight from England to India (1927)

Captain Charles Francis Wolley-Dod OBE (25 August 1892 – 15 or 16 March 1937) was a British pilot and aviation executive. A pioneer of commercial aviation, he was among the first pilots employed by Imperial Airways and later served as its European manager. During the airline's formative years (1924–1939), he played a leading role in establishing and developing its long distance air routes between London and destinations in South Africa, the Middle East, and India.

Wolley-Dod had a reputation for his sense of direction over Europe, rarely requiring the use of a map. In 1927, he co-piloted the aircraft that took Sir Geoffrey Salmond, Sir Samuel Hoare and Lady Maud Hoare in Imperial's first planned civilian flight from London to Delhi.

Wolley-Dod was killed "on flying duty ... just before the Second World War" about 20 miles (32 km) west of Cologne. Under-Secretary of State for Air Sir Philip Sassoon reported to Parliament that the cause of the crash was unknown. Why an important Imperial Airways manager was flying over Germany in 1937 remains unclear.

== Early life ==
Charles Francis Wolley-Dod was born to Francis and Annette Mary (Clarke) Wolley-Dod in 1892, in Lahore, British India (now Pakistan), one of four siblings, along with two brothers and one sister. His uncle Owen Cadogan Wolley-Dod was a career officer of the Lancashire Fusilliers. Another uncle, Anthony Hurt Wolley-Dod, was also a soldier and a noted botanist. His grandfather was Rev. Charles Wolley-Dod of Edge Hall, and the ornithologist John Wolley was his great-uncle.

Wolley-Dod was educated at Rugby School, Warwickshire, and initially settled in Canada where he took up farming. He then joined the military and was first an infantryman with 3rd Battalion, the Sherwood Foresters, before he began pilot training at the age 24 with Royal Flying Corps (RFC). He eventually served as a flying instructor for the Spanish Royal Air Force. He served the RFC in 75(HD) Squadron RFC until 1919. His younger brother Douglas Wolley-Dod was killed in action in France in 1915. A third uncle, Frederic Hova Wolley-Dod, was also a soldier and naturalist; he died of illness overseas in 1919.

In 1923, Wolley-Dod became a pilot for Imperial Airways. Two years later he married Janet Evelyn Gripper with whom he had a son.

== Later life ==
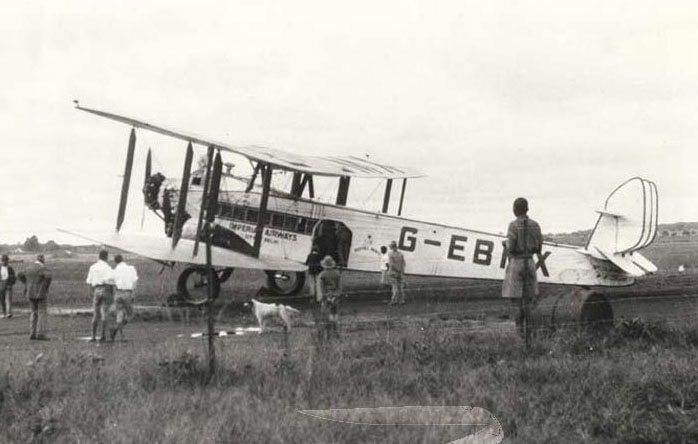
Imperial Airways DH.66 Hercules City of Delhi

In 1926, he helped develop Imperial's commercial routes so that a route to Baghdad became available, and by 1931, a route to Delhi. He was one of two pilots who flew RFC senior commander Sir Geoffrey Salmond, Cabinet member Sir Samuel Hoare, and Lady Maud Hoare in Imperial's first planned civilian flight from London to Delhi in 1927 in a de Havilland Hercules. He became an Officer of the Most Excellent Order of the British Empire in 1927.

In 1929, he represented Imperial Airways on the development of flight-proving routes from South Africa, performed jointly with the Air Ministry. When the North African division was created, Wolley-Dod was appointed in charge of it. He later crashed Alan Cobham's modified de Havilland Giant Moth biplane. In 1933, Imperial Airways appointed Wolley-Dod their European manager.

== Aircraft accident and death ==
=== Departure ===
On Monday, 15 March 1937, Wolley-Dod boarded a dual-pilot DH.86 (De Havilland Express), registration G-ACVZ "Jupiter" with 25-year-old wireless operator Gwyn Evans Langman, and 44-year-old pilot George Barker Holmes. (Note: Whilst news reports and mentions in the House of Commons cited the aircraft as belonging to Imperial Airways, researchers at Croydon Airport (Joanna Bogle and colleagues), clarify that the aircraft belonged to the Railway Air Services, and that it was a regular internal mail flight.) (Note: Some sources list Holmes' age as 43. Holmes had served with the Royal Flying Corps from 1917 to 1927, and then worked as a forest-fire patrol pilot and air surveyor in Canada and the United States before joining Imperial Airways in 1932. He was a resident of Croydon and had a wife and child. His grave marker reads "In memory of my husband Captain George Barker Holmes who fell over Cologne 16th March 1937 age 44" and has a Royal Air Force winged crown with the motto Per ardua ad astra.) A regular non-stop flight service that carried passengers and mail to Cologne's Butzweilerhof Flughafen Köln airport ( 50.984806°N 6.891417°E) would typically carry 10 passengers, that day, there were no passengers or mail, but the aircraft was required in Cologne for returning passengers. Also, due to waiting for a weather forecast, the aircraft left Croydon Airport (Imperial's operating base in south London, 51.356389°N 0.117222°W) at around 9:30 pm, instead of the usual scheduled 7:00 pm. According to Under-Secretary of State for Air Sir Philip Sassoon, "The pilot was heard at 10.58 pm to inform Brussels that he was flying in good visibility." (In 1937 the Brussels airfield used by Sabena and Imperial Airlines was Haren Airport, 50.880278°N 4.419167°E.) The plane was reported over Hasselt, Belgium, (50.97°N 5.375°E) at 11:18 pm.

=== Search for missing plane ===
According to the Gloucester Citizen, after the Jupiter's last transmission "anxiety had been felt because of the mountainous nature of the country between Brussels and Cologne," and in the same report, "then came silence and anxiety for there had been a gale and snowstorms, although the night was clear at Brussels." The following morning, several planes—an Imperial liner from Croydon and several aircraft of the Sabena Air Line in continental Europe—were dispatched to search for the missing flight crew. A Nottingham newspaper stated that "several Belgian military planes and all available machines of the Sabena air line went out early" to search. The Belgian planes searched the area between Hasselt and the Belgian-German border; according to the Midland Daily Telegraph, they also "patrolled the line usually taken by airliners to Cologne. This part of the frontier is sparsely inhabited. It is recalled that it was near this area that the body of Max Wenner, the Shropshire landowner, who fell from a Cologne to Brussels airliner lay missing for four days in January." The Imperial plane "Ava" was piloted by Capt. L.A. Walters, "one of the Company's senior commanders" and carried other Imperial Airways officials. According to the Evening Standard of Stoke-on-Trent, two German Deutsche Luft Hansa planes were also sent to search between Cologne and the frontier.

=== Wreckage ===
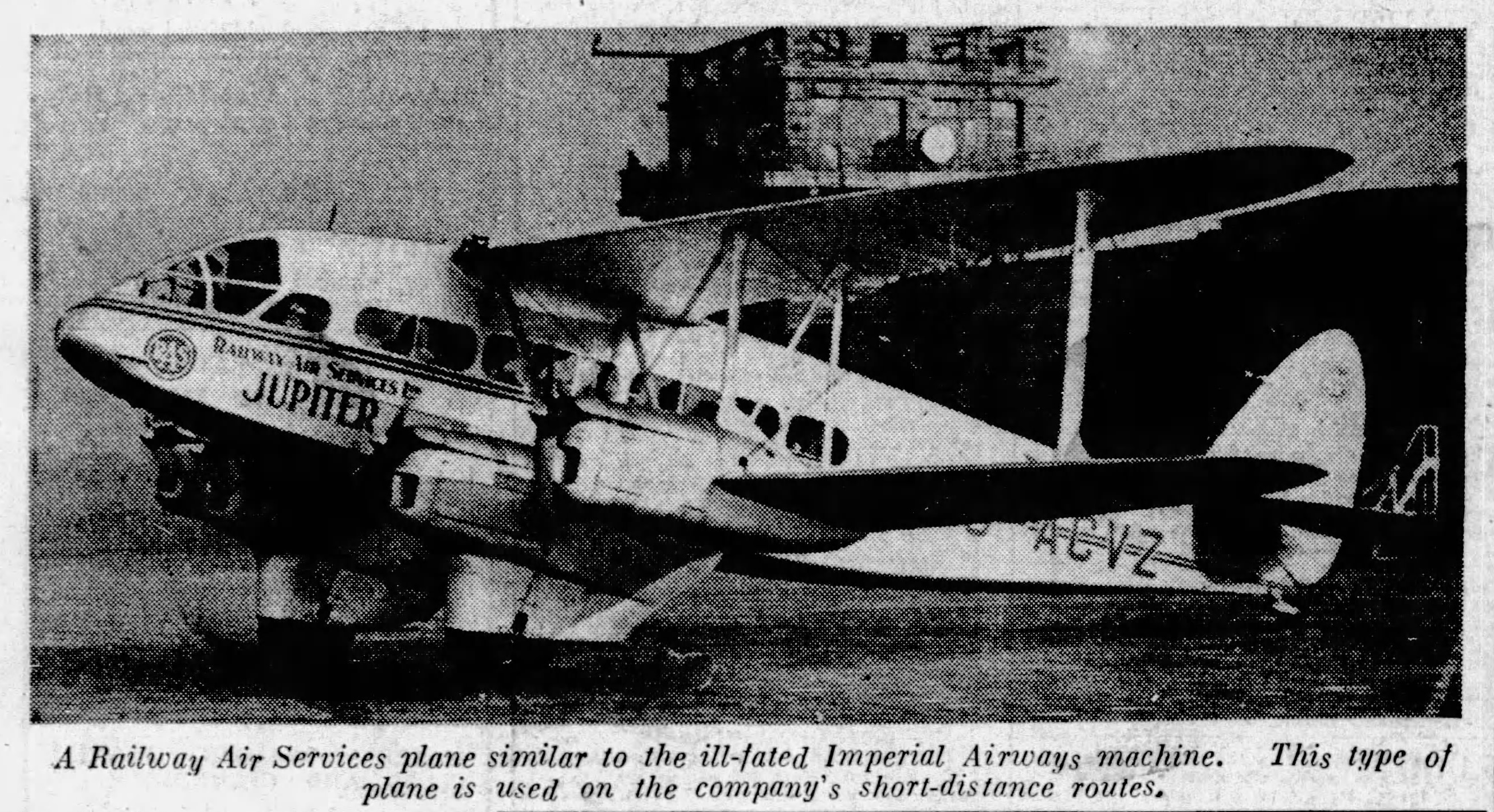
DH.86 (De Havilland Express) registration G-ACVZ "Jupiter" (Note: The machine was one of three DH.86s built to carry one pilot only)

At around 10 am on 16 March, a woodcutter "on his way to work" found the burnt wreckage. When he arrived "surrounding trees were smouldering". According to The Times, the wreck was found roughly 20 mi (32 km) west of Cologne. According to the Bureau of Aircraft Accident Archives, "Descending to Cologne Butzweilerhof Airport the aircraft crashed in unknown circumstances in Elsdorf (50.933333°N 6.566667°E), some 42 km [26 mi] northwest of the airport." The BAAA lists the time of the accident as 23:20 [local time] and the flight type as "Charter/Taxi (Non Scheduled Revenue Flight)." According to some contemporary reports, the wreckage was said to be found near a hunting lodge in a pinewood in Hambach Forest, west of Memmingen (47.9925°N 10.243611°E) Germany, a significant distance off track from its routine course. The flight typically would have gone over the Black Forest and part of the Swabian Jura. Another newspaper stated that the wreckage was found near "Elstorfer Borge, Wurtemberg, in the hilly region on the borders of the Swabian Alps, far out of her course, and far beyond her destination ... Memmingen, near where the Jupiter crashed is 250 mi (400 km) southeast and beyond Cologne." Another report said the wreckage was found "near Bergheim (50.966667°N 6.65°E) a small village west of Cologne" and several paragraphs later, "The plane had flown far beyond its destination and a long way out of its course when it crashed, possibly from a shortage of petrol." A third said the wreckage was "near a hunting lodge at Elstorfer Borge in the district of Burkheim (48.101111°N 7.598056°E), Wurtemburg. This is near the town of Memmingen." Lastly, one outlet claimed the "search was made more difficult by the nature of the countryside, which has numerous small pine-woods, deep heather and gorse, and a good deal of marshy ground." It is unclear what led to the apparent confusion between Burkheim-Bergheim and Eltsorfer Borge-Elsdorf, other than conflation of similar place names.

All three on the flight had been killed in the accident. It was reported that their watches stopped at 12:24. The plane carried five hours worth of fuel for what would usually be a four-hour non-stop journey. The Leicester Evening Mail report on the discovery of the wreckage stated, "Its fuel supplies would have only lasted until about 2 am." According to the Crewe Chronicle, the fuel on board "must have been exhausted by 2.30 am after which anxiety began to be felt." The Telegraph air correspondent noted that the DH.86 biplane was fitted with four Gypsy-Six 200 horsepower engines and had a cruising speed of 155 mph (249 km/h).

One newspaper report stated that "according to a police sergeant who found the wreckage ... at that time it was snowing and a gale was blowing. The plane seemed to have touched the treetops and then crashed." Parts of the plane were scattered over a 100 yd (91 m) radius. Two of the plane's engines lay at the foot of a large elm tree that had been damaged in two places by the crash. Seemingly according to the same police sergeant, as reported in the Evening Despatch, "All the occupants were burned beyond recognition."

According to the Manchester Guardian, a reporter for the Reuters news service visited the crash site on the afternoon of 16 March.

The wreck might never have been found had it not been for the woodcutter. I found the remains in the middle of the wood after ploughing my way through tracks for about an hour. The pilot seems to have been forced down by snow showers which fell throughout the night. The plane apparently hit a large elm tree that took the brunt of the impact. This tree, of a diameter of two feet, was broken in two places. Below lay two of the motors. The scene was as if someone had made a large bonfire in the wood. There was hardly anything left of the machine, which was completely burned out. The occupants must have been killed on the spot.

A Daily Telegraph correspondent also personally visited the scene:

When I arrived there was nothing to be seen but a large heap of ashes. The occupants had been thrown clear when the machine crashed. A large elm tree had been broken by impact and under lay two of the four engines. It is believed the pilot may have been forced down by snow showers and that the plane hit the top of the trees.

The Manchester Guardian also stated that "two carts later today conveyed coffins" to the scene of the disaster, "several miles from Bergheim" "in a hilly wood, about 30 mi (48 km) from [Cologne]," and that "there was no eye-witness of the crash."

Sassoon appeared before Parliament later that day on matters of national finance and was asked about the missing plane. He reported the loss of the plane and the crew and stated, "The cause of the accident is not yet determined. As far as we can ascertain there were rain and sleet moving eastward at the time over Belgium, but not general ice conditions." The plane had no deicing equipment. When MP Abraham Lyons asked, "Was this machine on a special mission or on part of the regular service?" Sassoon replied, "It was a regular service, I believe."

At the time of Wolley-Dod's death, he was a resident of Horley, Surrey. Wolley-Dod's probate record stated that his date of death was 16 March. An important figure at Imperial Airways, why Wolley-Dod was on a flight owned by the Railway Air Services and flying over Germany remains unknown.

== Legacy ==
By 1929, Wolley-Dod had become well known for his sense of direction over Europe and rarely required the use of a map. In Beyond the Blue Horizon: On the track of Imperial Airways, Alexander Frater describes Wolley-Dod as "legendary".

== See also ==
- 1933 Imperial Airways Diksmuide crash
- 1933 Imperial Airways Ruysselede crash
