= Jakab Schenk =

Hungarian ornithologist (1876 - 1945)

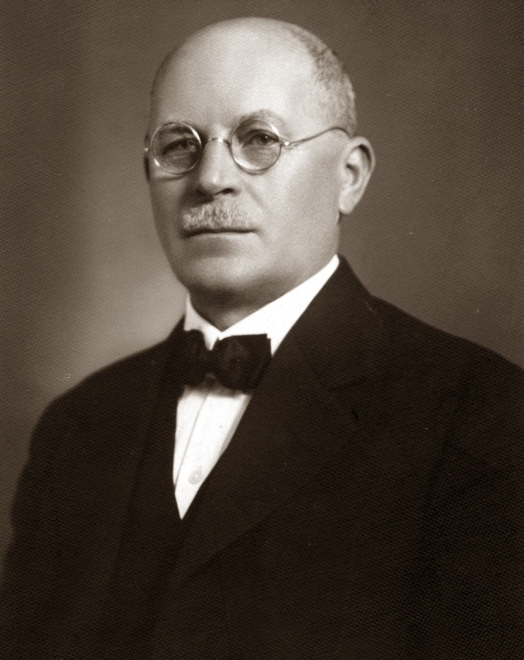

Jakab Vönöczky Schenk (June 2, 1876 – February 22, 1945) was a Hungarian ornithologist who helped establish a systematic bird ringing project in the region from 1908. He translated Hungarian articles into German and edited the journal Aquila from 1905.

== Life and work ==
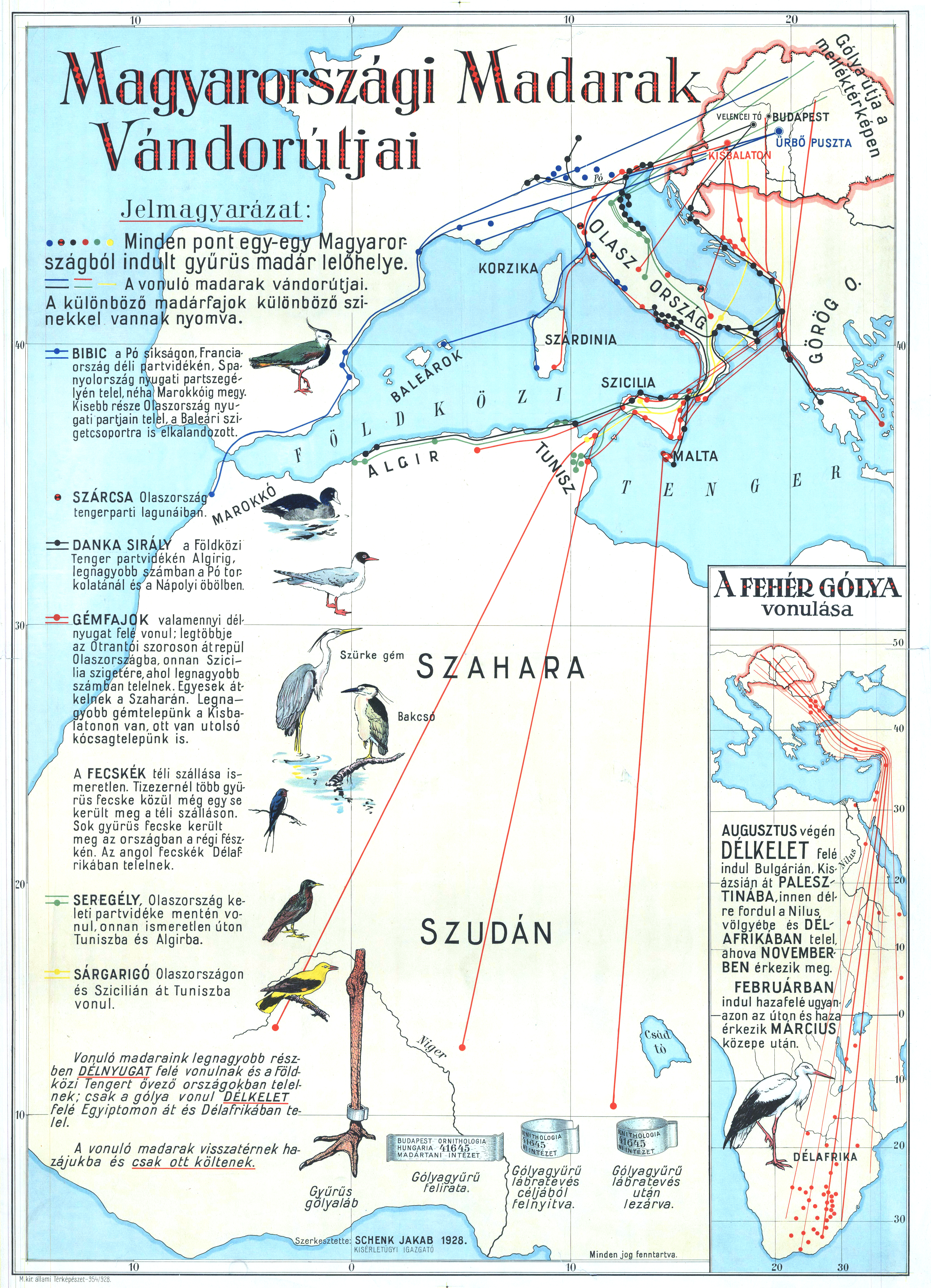
Migration map by Schenk, 1928

Schenk was born in Óverbász where his father was a master mason. As a young boy he enjoyed visiting the reed-beds to observe birds. He studied at Szarvas and then at the University of Cluj and graduated in Budapest in 1899. He was interested in mathematics and trained as a mathematics teacher, he was encouraged to take up ornithology by Otto Herman. He first joined military service with the Austro-Hungarian 14th infantry posted in Niederdorf, Tyrol. After demobilization in 1901 he joined back Herman as a secretary and helped edit the journal Aquila and also by translating content into German. In 1908 he began bird ringing exercises on white storks in Hungary, making it the third country after Denmark and Germany to conduct systematic ringing. He also became secretary at the ornithology centre and in 1927 became its director with Titusz Csörgey as assistant. He conducted surveys on the populations of white storks from 1909 to 1915. A white stork that he ringed was shot in Natal and the recovery became a major news event in 1909. He was involved in the conservation of egrets breeding in Kis Balaton. A major publication in 1928 was a map of bird migration in Hungary, a poster of which became famous and was exhibited in every Hungarian school. After retirement he moved during World War II to live with his son in Kőszeg where he died from a heart attack.
