= Italian Court Building =

Residential-retail, Chicago (1920–1968)

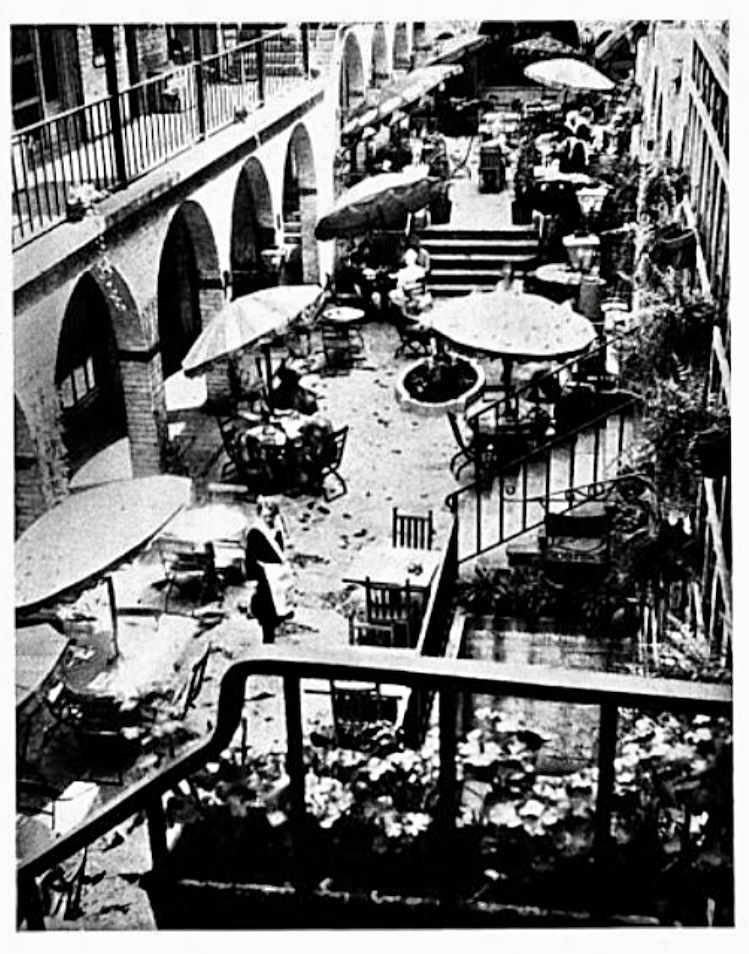
Courtyard and arcade of the Italian Court Building, Chicago (The Forecast magazine, 1930)

The Italian Court Building at 619 N. Michigan Avenue near Ontario on Chicago's Magnificent Mile was a 20th-century mixed-use building in the state of Illinois in the United States.

Designed by architect Robert Seeley DeGolyer, the Italian Court Building was initially two separate walk-up brick residential buildings; they were converted into a single unified structure with ground-floor retail in 1919–20. The courtyard had a central fountain and was surrounded by an arcade. Three floors were dedicated to offices. The building, described as "charming" and "much-beloved," housed a number of studios and became something of an artists' colony, serving as a "gathering spot for Chicago's bohemian artists and...the venue for poetry readings by Carl Sandburg, Robert Frost, and others." Le Petit Gourmet restaurant in the building, part of the Home Delicacies Association network of female-owned small businesses, was also said to be "charming" and was something of a landmark in its own right.

Jane Addams' Hull-House Shop was located in the building from 1932 to 1937. A guide to Chicago created for visitors to the 1933 World's Fair described the building at that time:

"On the east side stands the ITALIAN COURT BUILDING, occupied by studios and art shops. Among them is the Indian Trading Post, conducted by Fred Leighton, offering American Indian rugs, blankets, pottery, jewelry and other objects. A picturesque feature here is the Italian Court itself, like some old-world nook. Luncheons and dinners are served in the court, alfresco. In the basement of the building is Le Petit Gourmet, an outstanding restaurant founded by Mrs. William Vaughn Moody, widow of the Chicago poet."

The building was demolished in 1968 and replaced with a commercial skyscraper.
