= Picklescott =

Village in Shropshire, England

Coordinates: 52.590°N 2.835°W

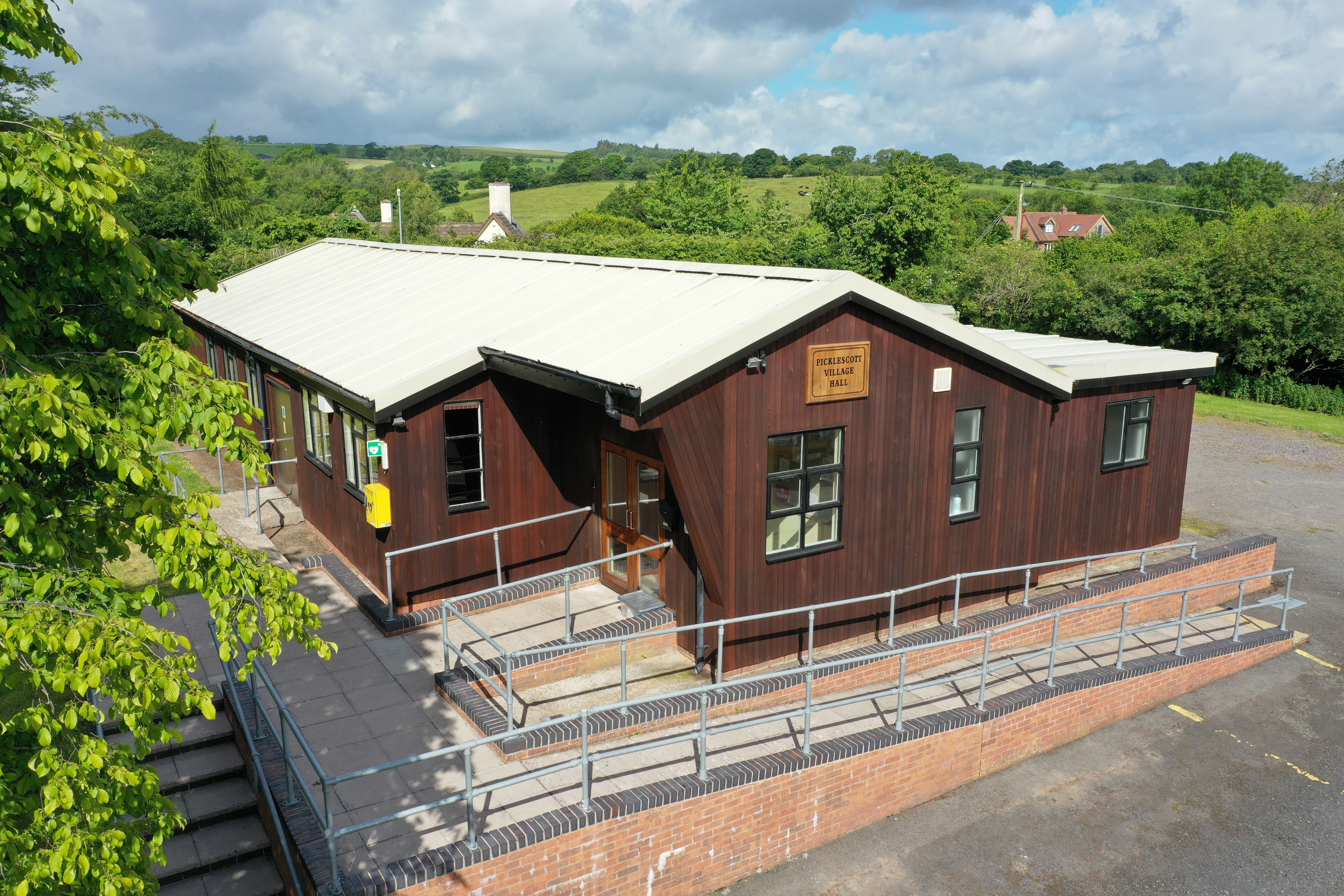
- Picklescott Village Hall June 2022

- Location within Shropshire
- OS grid reference: SO434995
- Civil parish: Smethcott
- Unitary authority: Shropshire
- Ceremonial county: Shropshire
- Region: West Midlands
- Country: England
- Sovereign state: United Kingdom
- Post town: CHURCH STRETTON
- Postcode district: SY6
- Dialling code: 01694
- Police: West Mercia
- Fire: Shropshire
- Ambulance: West Midlands
- UK Parliament: Shrewsbury and Atcham

Picklescott is a village in Shropshire, England.

It is located in the northern foothills of the Long Mynd, approximately 5 kilometres (3 miles) northwest of Church Stretton and 11 kilometres (7 miles) south of Shrewsbury.

Picklescott lies in the parish of Smethcott, now a hamlet to its east. To the south of the village is the hamlet of Betchcott.

There is a public house in Picklescott - the Bottle and Glass - a traditional country pub, which serves local real ales and food, and a Village Hall built in 1967 with additions in 2004.

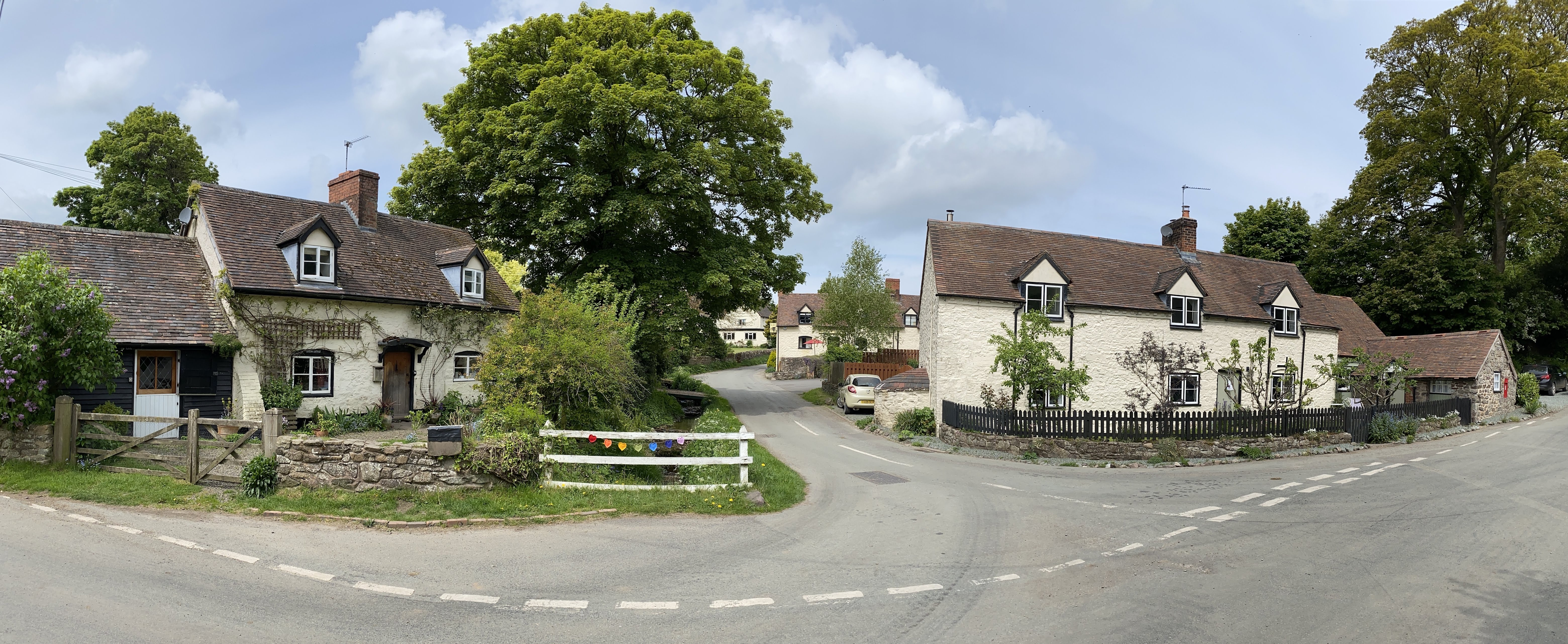
Picklescott Village photographed in 2021

== See also ==
- Listed buildings in Smethcott
