= Corliss v. Wenner =

Corliss v. Wenner, 34 P.3d 1100 (Idaho 2001), was a case decided by the Court of Appeals of Idaho that rejected the common law distinctions between lost, mislaid, and abandoned property and treasure trove.

== Decision ==
Four pounds of gold coins dating from 1857 to 1914 were found during the excavation of a driveway in Blaine County, Idaho. The court awarded the property to the owner of the property where the coins were found, instead of to the finder, and rejected the distinctions between categories of lost property as anachronistic in situations in which personal property is buried or hidden on privately owned realty.
