= Listed buildings in Woolstaston =

Woolstaston is a civil parish in Shropshire, England. It contains eight listed buildings that are recorded in the National Heritage List for England. Of these, three are listed at Grade II*, the middle of the three grades, and the others are at Grade II, the lowest grade. The parish contains the village of Woolstaston and the smaller settlement of Walkmills, and is otherwise rural. All the listed buildings are in the settlements, most of which are houses, farmhouses and farm buildings, and all of which are timber framed or have a timber framed core. The other listed buildings are a church and the surviving wing of a former country house.

== Key ==
Grade	Criteria
II*	Particularly important buildings of more than special interest
II	Buildings of national importance and special interest

== Buildings ==
Name and location	Photograph	Date	Notes	Grade
St Michael's Church; 52.58134°N 2.80979°W		Early 13th century	The church was restored in 1864–65 when the transept, vestry and bellcote were added. The church is built in sandstone and has a sandstone slate roof. It consists of a nave with a south porch, a south transept, and a chancel. The bellcote is square and timber framed, and has a pyramidal cap, a lead spirelet, and a weathervane.	II*
Bowdler's House; 52.58056°N 2.80947°W		Late 14th century	A farmhouse, later a private house, it was altered in the 16th century, remodelled in about 1878, and extended in the 20th century. The original part is timber framed with cruck construction and plastered infill, there is some rebuilding in red brick, and the remodelling is in painted brick. The house consists of a hall range with one storey and an attic and three bays, a gabled cross-wing with two storeys and three bays, a single-story extension to the right, and a large 20th-century addition to the southeast. The windows are casements, and there are gabled dormers. Inside the hall range are two full cruck trusses.	II*
Barn and shed, Bowdler's House; 52.58069°N 2.80914°W	—	Late 16th century	The barn is timber framed with cruck construction, it is weatherboarded on a sandstone plinth, and has a corrugated iron roof. There are three bays, and inside are four full cruck trusses. The shelter shed, at right angles, dates from the 19th century, and is in sandstone, with a sandstone slate roof, and it has an open front of four bays.	II
Castle Hill Farmhouse; 52.58732°N 2.78508°W	—	Mid 17th century	The farmhouse was extended in the 20th century. The earlier part is timber framed with painted brick infill on a brick plinth, and the extension is in painted brick with applied timbers. There is one storey and an attic, a front of three bays, a one-storey outbuilding to the right with a sandstone plinth, and a flat-roofed extension to the rear. On the front is a gabled porch, the windows are casements, and there are three gabled eaves dormers.	II
Rectory Farmhouse; 52.58128°N 2.81123°W		Mid 17th century	The farmhouse was later altered and farm buildings incorporated. It is timber framed with plastered infill, partly rendered, with applied timbers, partly on a sandstone plinth, and with a tile roof. There is one storey and an attic, and seven bays. On the front is a gabled porch and a lean-to porch, in the left gable end is a canted bay window, the windows are casements, and there are six gabled eaves dormers.	II
Barn, Castle Hill Farm; 52.58747°N 2.78517°W	—	Mid to late 17th century	The barn is timber framed with weatherboarding and some red brick infill, on a plinth of brick and sandstone, and it has a corrugated iron roof. There is one storey and a loft, and three bays. The barn contains two doorways and a raking left dormer.	II
Former farm buildings 52.58043°N 2.81031°W		Mid to late 17th century	Originally cow houses and a cart shed, later converted for other uses, the building is timber framed with red brick infill on a sandstone plinth, and partly rebuilt in sandstone, with some weatherboarding and a tile roof. There are two storeys and six bays. It contains doorways, casement windows, and gabled dormers.	II
Woolstaston Hall and wall 52.58043°N 2.81107°W		c. 1671	The south wing of a former country house, the rest was demolished in about 1784, and with some 19th-century additions. The house is in red brick, partly painted, with sandstone dressings, on a plinth, with a band, chamfered quoins, and a hipped tile roof. There are two storeys an attic and a basement, seven bays, a one-bay wing at the rear, and two gabled wings on the right. Three steps lead up to a central doorway that has panelled pilasters containing grotesque heads, an entablature with garlands, a pulvinated frieze, a moulded cornice, and a triangular pediment flanked by urns. The windows are sashes and there are gabled dormers. To the east is part of a forecourt wall in red brick on a sandstone plinth with sandstone dressings, containing a doorway and a pair of cast iron gates.	II*
