= Christopher Wenner =

British journalist and television presenter (1954–2021)

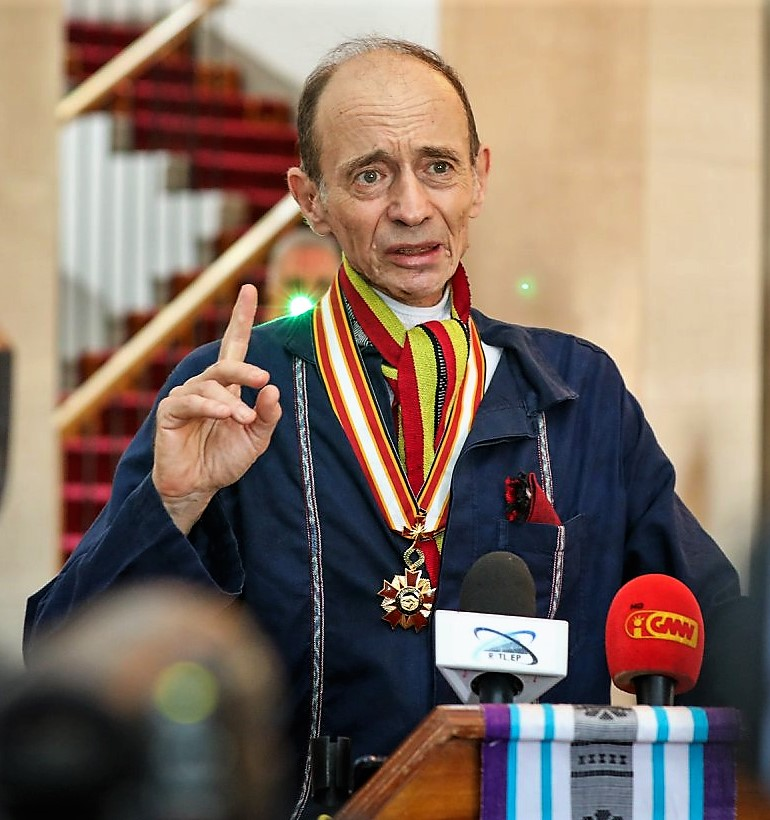
- Wenner in 2019
- Born: Christopher Max Wenner; 6 December 1954; Kensington, West London, England
- Died: 28 October 2021 (aged 66); Brisbane, Queensland, Australia
- Other name: Max Stahl
- Citizenship: Timor-Leste (honorary)
- Education: Stonyhurst College, Lancashire
- Alma mater: Balliol College, Oxford
- Occupations: Television presenter War correspondent Journalist
- Known for: Blue Peter; Channel 4 News (ITN) (international war coverage)
- Children: 4

Christopher Max Wenner, known as Christopher Wenner and later as Max Stahl (6 December 1954 – 28 October 2021), was a British journalist and television presenter. He was best known for filming an East Timorese demonstration and its aftermath that became known as the Santa Cruz massacre. His coverage of East Timor's struggle for independence is listed in UNESCO's Memory of the World international register as a "turning point" in the birth of a new nation.

== Early life ==
Wenner was born in Kensington, West London, England. He was the third of the four sons of Michael Alfred Wenner (1921–2020), a British author, company director, former diplomat who served as Ambassador to El Salvador (from 1967 to 1971), and Gunnilla Ståhle (1931–1986), who was Swedish. The surname he later used as a war correspondent was a variation on his mother's maiden name.

== Education ==
Wenner was educated at Stonyhurst College, a boarding independent school near Clitheroe in Lancashire, which he left in 1973, followed by an English Language & Literature degree at Balliol College, Oxford, where he acted in the Dramatic Society.

== Life and career ==
On 14 September 1978, Wenner joined the British children's television programme Blue Peter, replacing John Noakes, who had left three months earlier. However, he left on 23 June 1980 (on the same day as his co-presenter Tina Heath), after the production team decided not to renew his contract as he was "deeply unpopular with the viewers."

Wenner returned to acting, taking a part in the 1984 Doctor Who adventure The Awakening, although in the final cut, his role was reduced to that of a non-speaking character. He then focused on journalism, although he returned to Blue Peter in 1983 and 1998 to celebrate the show's birthdays.

In 1985, whilst working as a war correspondent in Beirut, he went missing; he turned up again, safe and well, after 18 days. He had been detained by militiamen for 24 hours who had warned him off reporting a story about the hashish trade, and he had gone into hiding in a friend's house. In 1991, he entered East Timor, then occupied by Indonesia, with the documentary maker Peter Gordon to film a diving video. There, he was informed that a pro-democracy demonstration would be taking place during a funeral at the Santa Cruz cemetery in the capital, Dili. He shot footage of the demonstration, preceding and during what would become known as the Santa Cruz massacre. As soldiers advanced, in a well-organised operation against a huge crowd of East Timorese engaged in peaceful protest, he filmed inside the cemetery among the dead and the dying. To avoid confiscation of his footage, he then buried it in a grave. After being questioned for nine hours, he returned under cover of darkness to exhume the footage. It was that footage that brought the plight of the East Timorese to world attention. In 1992, Yorkshire Television's First Tuesday episode "Cold Blood – the Massacre of East Timor", produced by Gordon and co-directed by Gordon and Wenner, was awarded the Amnesty International UK Media Award.

In 1999, Wenner returned to East Timor under the name "Max Stahl". He entered the country covertly by hiring fishing boats, in order to avoid the Indonesian military. This time he filmed Indonesian-backed violence on women and children in a refugee camp. For his coverage, he won the 2000 Rory Peck Award for Hard News.

In 2013, Wenner's audiovisual material on East Timor's struggle for independence was added to UNESCO's Memory of the World Register as "On the birth of a nation: turning points". The material is kept at the Max Stahl Audiovisual Centre for Timor-Leste (Portuguese: Centro Audiovisual Max Stahl em Timor-Leste) (CAMSTL). In December 2016, CAMSTL entered into a protocol with the National University of Timor-Leste and the University of Coimbra (UC) aimed at preserving the material in the form of an online image archive. In February 2019, Wenner gave a public presentation of the archive following its installation at the UC. Since then, the archive has been accessible for research and educational projects.

In December 2019, the National Parliament of Timor-Leste voted unanimously to grant Wenner Timorese citizenship in recognition of his role in the fight for Timorese liberation.

Wenner was one of the first Western journalists to recognize the scope of tensions in Chechnya. He travelled there with cameraman, filmmaker and author Peter Vronsky in 1992 to report on the break-away republic and nuclear weapons materials smuggling for the Canadian-produced television special The Hunt for Red Mercury.

In 1998, whilst working as an ITN journalist for Channel 4, Wenner was beaten by Serb civilians during a mass protest.

== Awards and honours ==
On 22 November 2019, Wenner was awarded the Order of Timor-Leste by President Francisco Guterres. In 2000 he won the Rory Peck award for his reports.

== Personal life ==
Wenner was a father of four, and ran his own production company while continuing his career in journalism. In April 2012, it was reported that he had been receiving treatment for throat cancer. On 28 October 2021, the President of Timor-Leste, José Ramos-Horta, announced that Wenner had died from cancer at a hospital in Brisbane, Australia, at the age of 66.
