= Gone to Earth =

Gone to Earth may refer to:

- Gone to Earth (novel), a 1917 novel by Mary Webb which was the basis for the 1950 film
- Gone to Earth (film), a 1950 film by the British-based director-writer team of Powell and Pressburger
- Gone to Earth (Barclay James Harvest album), by Barclay James Harvest
- Gone to Earth (David Sylvian album), a 1986 solo album by David Sylvian
- "Gone to Earth", a song by the American Analog Set from their 1996 album The Fun of Watching Fireworks
- "Gone to Earth", a song by Goldfrapp from their single "Black Cherry"
