= Leighton and Eaton Constantine =

Civil parish in Shropshire, England

Coordinates: 52.647°N 2.577°W

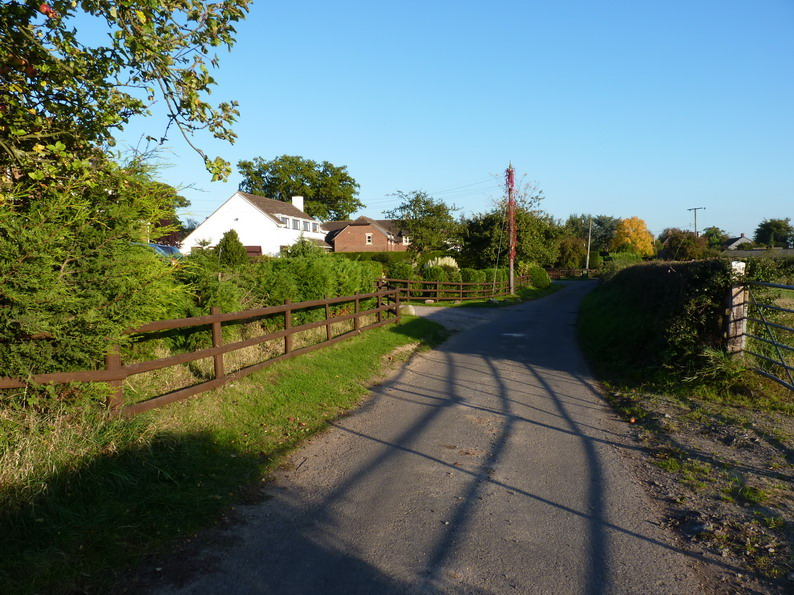
- The lane into Garmston, a hamlet in the parish of Leighton and Eaton Constantine

- Location within Shropshire
- Population: 467 (2011)
- OS grid reference: SJ 61256 05331
- Unitary authority: Shropshire
- Ceremonial county: Shropshire
- Region: West Midlands
- Country: England
- Sovereign state: United Kingdom
- Post town: Shrewsbury
- Postcode district: SY5
- Police: West Mercia
- Fire: Shropshire
- Ambulance: West Midlands
- UK Parliament: Shropshire

Leighton and Eaton Constantine is a civil parish in Shropshire, England. It consists of the village of Leighton, together with the smaller villages or hamlets of Eaton Constantine, Upper Longwood and Garmston.

The parish, which had a population of 420 at the 2001 census, 467 at the 2011 Census, rising from just 206 in 1911, is around six miles southwest of Telford and 26 miles from Birmingham.

== Leighton ==
The village is situated along the River Severn, on the Shrewsbury and Worcester turnpike road near the Severn Valley Railway, and comprises 2,151 acres (870 ha). The village itself is small, and comprises just a few houses, a church, a pub (the Mill at Leighton) and Hall. There are several black and white buildings which line the Shrewsbury to Ironbridge road which runs through the village, and provides the main transport link for the villagers. There is also a good deal of vegetation, such as trees and shrubbery lining the roads, some of the which also form part of the Leighton Hall estate, which is a red-brick building built in around 1778. Standing at the entrance to the hall is Leighton Lodge, which is significant as it is the birthplace of Shropshire author Mary Webb who wrote Precious Bane and various other stories about Shropshire.

The village church, St Mary's Church, is also within the Parkland although it does predate its neighbour by around 60 years.

The village has a public house, The Mill at Leighton, a Grade II Listed Building which featured on Channel 4's Time Team programme in 2002, revealing a furnace in its cellar used in the local iron industry; its site has origins dating back 1,000 years including a corn mill dating back to the Domesday Book period. In 2021 it was leased as a community enterprise in name of The Leighton Pub Company.

== St Mary's Church ==
The church has been key feature in Leighton since being restored in around 1716, after being rebuilt on the site of a Norman church. The two iron tombstones in the Nave, dated 1677 and 1696 were cast in the village where iron was smelted from at least 1650. On the south of the chancel arch is an heraldic device which were common around the 1800s, and this particular one was a memorial of the head of the manorial family. The church registers begin in 1661, and in the Church porch, there are records of the various benefactions for the poor of the parish. Inside the church are many memorials to the Leighton family including an effigy possibly dating from the 13th century. It depicts a knight in chain mail. Other effigies are dedicated to the Kynnersley family. A wooden plaque in the porch forms the parish's First World War memorial. The writer Mary Webb was christened there.

== Housing ==
This table shows how the number of houses in Leighton has changed and increased since 1831.

Year	No. of houses
1831	74
1841	80
1851	67
1881	67
1891	59
1901	63
1921	56
1931	59
1951	116
1961	116

In 2012, the average house value in Leighton was £360,967, compared to the UK average house price of £228,385. Amongst the local houses there are 37 listed buildings in the village, including the post office and Leighton Hall as well as some private residential houses. Leighton Hall is a large Grade II listed manor house overlooking the River Severn and the Welsh hills from its south-facing gardens.

== Notable people ==
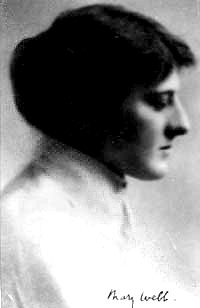
Mary Webb, born in Leighton in 1881

Antiquary Edward Williams (1762-1833) was baptised at Leighton in 1762.

Cricketer William Wingfield was vicar of Leighton from 1863 to 1901.

Mary Webb, born at Leighton Lodge in 1881 and lived there before moving to Much Wenlock at age one, was an English romantic novelist and poet of the early 20th century, who set all six of her novels in South Shropshire. The 1950 Michael Powell and Emeric Pressburger production of Webb's Gone to Earth was filmed in the area.

Admiral Sir Richard Onslow was born at Garmston in 1904.

== See also ==
- Listed buildings in Leighton and Eaton Constantine
