= Cold Comfort Farm (film) =

1995 British TV film

- US theatrical release poster
- Based on: Cold Comfort Farm by Stella Gibbons
- Screenplay by: Malcolm Bradbury
- Directed by: John Schlesinger
- Starring: Eileen Atkins; Kate Beckinsale; Sheila Burrell; Stephen Fry; Freddie Jones; Joanna Lumley; Ian McKellen; Miriam Margolyes; Rufus Sewell
- Music by: Robert Lockhart
- Country of origin: United Kingdom
- Original language: English

Production
- Producers: Alison Gilby; Richard Broke
- Cinematography: Chris Seager
- Editor: Mark Day
- Running time: 95 minutes
- Production company: Thames Television

Original release
- Network: BBC
- Release: 1 January 1995

Cold Comfort Farm is a 1995 British comedy film directed by John Schlesinger and produced by the BBC and Thames Television, an adaptation of Stella Gibbons' 1932 book of the same name, the film stars Kate Beckinsale, Joanna Lumley, Ian McKellen and Rufus Sewell. Originally broadcast on 1 January 1995 on the BBC, it was Schlesinger's final film shot in his home country of Britain, and was picked up for theatrical release by Gramercy Pictures in North America, where it was a small success.

== Plot ==
After the death of her parents, Flora Poste finds herself with nowhere to live. Her small annual income is inadequate for her needs, and her friend the divorcee Mary Smiling tells her she will have to get a job. Flora, however, aspires to be a writer, and rather than seeking employment she opts to send letters to her many relatives to see if any would be prepared to take her in. Through Mary, Flora meets Charles Fairford, who develops feelings for her.

Receiving no positive replies from her city-based relations, Flora extends her search to her "dreadful" country relatives. She is intrigued by a letter from a cousin, Judith Starkadder, inviting her to Cold Comfort Farm in Sussex. Judith states that it is her duty to take Flora in to atone for some unspecified wrong the Starkadders once did to Flora's father.

Arriving at the Starkadder's dilapidated farm, Flora meets its family of eccentric inhabitants, who initially only refer to her as "Robert Poste’s Child". The family is controlled from her bedroom by the reclusive matriarch Aunt Ada Doom – who claims to have seen "something nasty in the woodshed". Judith, Ada's daughter, is married to Amos, a local fire-and-brimstone preacher of the Quivering Brethren sect, who refuses to allow anything about the farm to be changed without Aunt Ada's consent (which is never granted). Their sons Reuben and Seth are forced to take on most of the work. Also living with the family is Elfine Starkadder, an unworldly young woman who spends much of her time communing with nature.

Resolutely cheerful and practical, Flora sets to work to transform the dysfunctional family. Taking it upon herself to care for the reclusive Aunt Ada, she gradually introduces her to the potential pleasures of the outside world, bringing her fashion and travel magazines. Amos remains obdurate, but Flora convinces him that he could save vastly more souls as a travelling preacher than he is able to merely by preaching locally; eventually he departs to take his sermons on the road. Seth, she realises, has little interest in farming, but is fascinated by the movies. She introduces him to a Hollywood producer, Earl P. Neck, who is impressed with Seth's film star looks and who casts him in his latest movie, taking him also away from the farm. Reuben fears Flora's influence and believes she intends to take the farm away from the family, but softens when she explains that he is the natural person to take overall charge.

Flora learns of Elfine Starkadder's affair with Dick Hawk-Monitor, son of the local squire, and of her despair that he is unable to marry her due to her lowly social status. With the help of Mary and Charles, Flora reinvents Elfine's image and introduces her to high society. She smuggles Elfine into Dick's 21st birthday celebrations where, in spite of his parents' continued disapproval of the match, Dick publicly proposes to Elfine.

Reuben becomes the head of the family, and enjoys his new role; he naively proposes to Flora, and she gently declines. Aunt Ada is becoming more receptive to new ideas, and Flora secures her approval of Elfine's marriage.

On Elfine's wedding day Aunt Ada unexpectedly appears, sumptuously dressed, and announces that she intends to travel and will shortly be leaving for France. She is about to reveal the wrong done to Flora's father, when she is interrupted by the arrival of Charles in his private plane. Flora declares her love for him, she climbs into the cockpit, and they depart from Cold Comfort Farm together.

== Cast ==
- Kate Beckinsale as Flora Poste
- Joanna Lumley as Mary Smiling
- Ian McKellen as Amos Starkadder
- Rufus Sewell as Seth Starkadder
- Eileen Atkins as Judith Starkadder
- Sheila Burrell as Ada Doom
  - Myfanwy Hill as young Ada Doom
- Stephen Fry as Mybug
- Freddie Jones as Adam Lambsbreath
- Miriam Margolyes as Mrs Beetle
- Ivan Kaye as Reuben Starkadder
- Jeremy Peters as Urk
- Maria Miles as Elfine Starkadder
- Christopher Bowen as Charles Fairford
- Louise Rea as Meriam Beetle
- Sophie Revell as Rennet
- Rupert Penry-Jones as Dick Hawk-Monitor
- Angela Thorne as Mrs Hawk-Monitor
- Harry Ditson as Earl P. Neck
- Frederick Jaeger as Dr. Adolf Müdel
- Trevor Baxter as Sneller

== Production ==
The film was edited at Rank Film Laboratories, part of The Rank Organisation. The film itself reached a length of 2,902 metres, and ultimately became 105 minutes long in movie format. The soundtrack was created through development of pre-existing pieces remixed for the film. The majority of the songs used in the film were arranged by Robert Lockhart. The soundtrack was recorded at Lansdowne Studios in London, and was rerecorded at Twickenham Film Studios.

Director John Schlesinger was the only one who thought it would work in North America cinemas and so had to put up the money himself to blow up the print from 16mm to 35mm; he took the new format to the Toronto Film Festival, where its success led to a North American release.

The production visited Kent where they filmed at Kent & East Sussex Railway which provided the trains for Flora's journey from London, and Northiam station in East Sussex for the fictional railway station of Beershorn Halt.

Further scenes were filmed in Brightling in East Sussex, and Twickenham Studios in London.

The Royal Military Canal was also used for scenes where Flora and Elfine walk and chat.

== Reception ==
During its theatrical release in North America, the film grossed $5,682,429 in total. Cold Comfort Farm received generally positive reviews. On Rotten Tomatoes, it has an approval rating of 83% based on reviews from 40 critics. The website's critics consensus reads, "Cold Comfort Farm sends up high-minded classics with a wit and impressive restraint that rivals its inspirations." Metacritic, which uses a weighted average, assigned the film a score of 82 out of 100, based on 16 critics, indicating "universal acclaim".

Emanuel Levy of Variety wrote: "The fun that Schlesinger and his first-rate ensemble must have had while working on this production is infectious, for there isn't one dull -- or quiet -- moment in the film."
