= Cold Comfort Farm =

1932 novel by Stella Gibbons

- First edition
- Author: Stella Gibbons
- Language: English
- Genre: Comic novel
- Publisher: Longman
- Publication date: 8 September 1932
- Publication place: United Kingdom
- Media type: Print (hardback)
- Pages: xii, 307 pp
- ISBN: 0-14-144159-3 (current Penguin Classics edition)

Cold Comfort Farm is a comic novel by English author Stella Gibbons, published in 1932. It parodies the romanticised, sometimes doom-laden accounts of rural life popular at the time, by writers such as Mary Webb. The novel was awarded the Femina Vie Heureuse Prize in 1933.

== Plot summary ==
Following the death of her parents, the book's heroine, Flora Poste, finds she is possessed "of every art and grace save that of earning her own living". She decides to take advantage of the fact that "no limits are set, either by society or one's own conscience, to the amount one may impose on one's relatives", and settles on visiting her distant relatives at the isolated Cold Comfort Farm in the fictional village of Howling in Sussex. The inhabitants of the farm – Aunt Ada Doom, the Starkadders, and their extended family and workers – feel obliged to take her in to atone for an unspecified wrong once done to her father.

As is typical in a certain genre of romantic 19th-century and early 20th-century literature, each of the farm's inhabitants has some long-festering emotional problem caused by ignorance, hatred, or fear, and the farm is badly run. Flora, being a level-headed, urban woman in the dandy tradition, determines that she must apply modern common sense to their problems and help them adapt to the 20th century – bringing metropolitan values into the sticks.

== Inspirations ==
As parody of the "loam and lovechild" genre, Cold Comfort Farm alludes specifically to a number of novels both in the past and contemporarily in vogue when Gibbons was writing. According to Faye Hammill's "Cold Comfort Farm, D. H. Lawrence, and English Literary Culture Between the Wars", the works of Sheila Kaye-Smith and Mary Webb are the chief influence: she considered that the farm is modelled on Dormer House in Webb's The House in Dormer Forest, and Aunt Ada Doom on Mrs. Velindre in the same book. The farm-obsessed Reuben's original is in Kaye-Smith's Sussex Gorse, and the Quivering Brethren on the Colgate Brethren in Kaye-Smith's Susan Spray. Others see John Cowper Powys's rural mysticism as a further target, as featured in his Wessex novel Wolf Solent (1929): "He felt as if he enjoyed at that hour some primitive life-feeling that was identical with what those pollarded elms felt."

The speech of the Sussex characters is a parody of rural dialects (in particular Sussex and West Country accents – another parody of novelists who use phonics to portray various accents and dialects) and is sprinkled with fake but authentic-sounding local vocabulary such as mollocking (Seth's favourite activity, undefined but invariably resulting in the pregnancy of a local maid), sukebind (a weed whose flowering in the Spring symbolises the quickening of sexual urges in man and beast; the word is presumably formed by analogy to 'woodbine' (honeysuckle) and bindweed) and clettering (an impractical method used by Adam for washing dishes, which involves scraping them with a dry twig or clettering stick).

Her portrayal of libidinous Meyerburg, "Mr Mybug", may have been aimed at Hampstead intellectuals (particularly Freudians and admirers of D. H. Lawrence), but has also been seen as antisemitic in its description of his physiognomy and nameplay.

== Responses and influence ==
Sheila Kaye-Smith, often said to be one of the rural writers parodied by Gibbons in Cold Comfort Farm, arguably gets her own back with a tongue-in-cheek reference to Cold Comfort Farm within a subplot of A Valiant Woman (1939), set in a rapidly modernising village. The upper-middle-class teenager Lucia turns from writing charming rural poems to a great Urban Proletarian Novel: "… all about people who aren't married going to bed in a Manchester slum and talking about the Means Test." Her philistine grandmother is dismayed: she prefers "cosy" rural novels, and knows Lucia is ignorant of proletarian life:

That silly child! Did she really think she could write a novel? Well, of course, modern novels might encourage her to think so. There was nothing written nowadays worth reading. The book on her knee was called Cold Comfort Farm and had been written by a young woman who was said to be very clever and had won an important literary prize. But she couldn't get on with it at all. It was about life on a farm, but the girl obviously knew nothing about country life. To anyone who, like herself, had always lived in the country, the whole thing was too ridiculous and impossible for words.

Elizabeth Janeway responded to the lush ruralism of Laurie Lee's memoir Cider with Rosie by suggesting an astringent counterblast might be found by "looking for an old copy of Stella Gibbons's Cold Comfort Farm".

== Characters ==
In order of appearance:

In London:

- Flora Poste: the heroine, a nineteen-year-old from London whose parents have recently died
- Mary Smiling: a widow, Flora's friend in London
- Charles Fairford: Flora's cousin in London, studying to become a parson

In Howling village Sussex:

- Judith Starkadder: Flora's cousin, wife of Amos, with an unhealthy preoccupation for her own son Seth
- Seth Starkadder: younger son of Amos and Judith, handsome and over-sexed, with a passion for the movies
- Ada Doom: Judith's mother, a reclusive, miserly widow, owner of the farm, who constantly complains of having seen "something nasty in the woodshed" when she was a girl
- Adam Lambsbreath: 90-year-old farm hand, obsessed with his cows and with Elfine
- Mark Dolour: farm hand, father of Nancy
- Amos Starkadder: Judith's husband and hellfire preacher at the Church of the Quivering Brethren ("Ye're all damned!")
- Amos's half-cousins: Mica, married to Susan; Urk, who expects to marry Elfine and is devoted to water-voles; Ezra, married to Jane; Caraway, married to Lettie; Harkaway
- Amos's half-brothers: Luke, married to Prue; Mark, divorced from Susan and married to Phoebe
- Reuben Starkadder: Amos's heir, jealous of anyone who might stand between him and his inheritance of the farm
- Meriam Beetle: hired girl and mother of Seth's four children
- Mrs Beetle: Meriam's mother, cleaning lady, rather more sensible than the Starkadders
- Elfine: an intellectual, nature-loving girl of the Starkadder family, who is besotted with the local squire Richard Hawk-Monitor of Hautcouture (pronounced "Howchiker") Hall
- Mrs Murther: landlady of The Condemn'd Man public house
- Mr Meyerburg (whom Flora thinks of as "Mr Mybug"): a writer who pursues Flora and insists that she only refuses him because she is sexually repressed; he is working on a thesis that the works of the Brontë sisters were written by their brother Branwell Brontë
- Claud Hart-Harris: urbane friend of Flora's whom she summons to accompany her, Seth and Elfine to a ball at Hautcouture Hall
- Mrs Hawk-Monitor: initially far from being pleased at her son's choice of bride
- Rennett: unwanted daughter of Susan and Mark
- Dr Müdel: psychoanalyst
- Mr Neck: film producer

Animals at Cold Comfort Farm:

- Graceless, Aimless, Feckless, and Pointless: the farm's cows and Adam Lambsbreath's chief charge
- Viper: the horse, who pulls the trap which is the farm's main transportation
- Big Business: the bull, who spends most of his time inside the barn

== Futurism ==
Although the book was published in 1932, the setting is an unspecified near future, shortly after the "Anglo-Nicaraguan wars of 1946". It refers to future social and demographic changes, such as the changing neighbourhoods of London: Mayfair has become a slum and Lambeth is fashionable.

The book contains technological developments that Gibbons thought might have been invented by then, such as TV phones and air-taxis, so the novel has been compared to science fiction.

== Prequel and sequel ==
- Christmas at Cold Comfort Farm (actually a collection of short stories, of which Christmas was the first) was published in 1940. It is a prequel of sorts, set before Flora's arrival at the farm, and is a parody of a typical family Christmas.
- Conference at Cold Comfort Farm, a sequel, was published in 1949 to mixed reviews.

== Adaptations ==
Cold Comfort Farm has been adapted several times, including twice by BBC television.

- In 1968 a television serial was made, dramatised by David Turner in three 45 minute episodes. It starred Alastair Sim as Amos, Fay Compton as Aunt Ada, Sarah Badel as Flora Poste, Rosalie Crutchley as Judith, Brian Blessed as Reuben and Peter Egan as Seth. Joan Bakewell was the narrator. This BBC adaptation was released on VHS but as of April 2014 is no longer available commercially.
- In 1981, the BBC produced a four-part radio adaptation by Elizabeth Proud, who also narrated. Patricia Gallimore played Flora, and Miriam Margolyes played Mrs. Beetle. In January 1983, a 2-part sequel, There Have Always Been Starkadders at Cold Comfort Farm, set several years later and based on Conference at Cold Comfort Farm, when Flora is married with several children, was broadcast, with Patricia Gallimore again playing Flora.
- The 1995 television film was generally well received by critics. Janet Maslin wrote in The New York Times that this screen version "gets it exactly right". The film stars Kate Beckinsale as Flora, Joanna Lumley as her friend and mentor Mary Smiling, Rufus Sewell as Seth, Ian McKellen as Amos Starkadder, Eileen Atkins as Judith, Stephen Fry as Mybug, and Angela Thorne as Mrs Hawk-Monitor. Freddie Jones, who had played both Urk and Dr Mudel in the 1968 version, appeared as Adam Lambsbreath, while Miriam Margolyes again played Mrs. Beetle. The 1995 version was produced by BBC Films and Thames International, and was directed by John Schlesinger, from a script by novelist Malcolm Bradbury. It was filmed on location at Brightling, East Sussex. In 1996 and 1997, this version also had a brief theatrical run in North America, Australia and some European countries. Schlesinger reportedly used his own money to enlarge the 16mm BBC version of the film to 35mm before being distributed by Gramercy Pictures.

== Other uses of title ==
The book inspired Mellon family heiress Cordelia Scaife May to name her home "Cold Comfort", and to name her philanthropic foundation Colcom Foundation.

== Critical reception ==
BBC News included Cold Comfort Farm on its list of the 100 most influential novels.
