= Eaton Constantine =

Village in Shropshire, England

Coordinates: 52.652°N 2.597°W

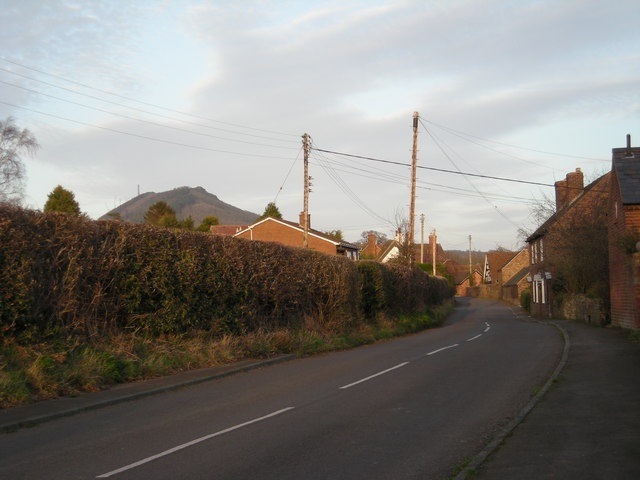
- Eaton Constantine, with The Wrekin in the distance

- Location within Shropshire
- OS grid reference: SJ596062
- Civil parish: Leighton and Eaton Constantine
- Unitary authority: Shropshire
- Ceremonial county: Shropshire
- Region: West Midlands
- Country: England
- Sovereign state: United Kingdom
- Post town: SHREWSBURY
- Postcode district: SY5
- Dialling code: 01952
- Police: West Mercia
- Fire: Shropshire
- Ambulance: West Midlands
- UK Parliament: Shrewsbury and Atcham

Eaton Constantine is a small village and former civil parish, now in the parish of Leighton and Eaton Constantine, in Shropshire, England. It is located just off the B4380 road, between Atcham and Buildwas, near The Wrekin hill. In 1931 the parish had a population of 200. On 1 April 1934 the parish was abolished and merged with Leighton.

Near Eaton Constantine are the remains of a Roman vexillation fortress and three marching camps near a bend in the River Severn. The fortress lies in open farmland on a low south-eastward projecting spur between Ranslett House and Eye Farm. It was defended by a triple-ditch system measuring about 920 x 1,050 feet (c.280 x 320m) within the defences, which enclosed an area of just under 22¼ acres (c.9ha). This substantial defensive system indicates that this was no ordinary marching encampment, and its size would have been sufficient to house a substantial force of around 2,500 Roman legionaries and auxiliary soldiers. The fortress was probably occupied by a contingent of Legio XIV Gemina, together with a couple of auxiliary cavalry units.

== Etymology ==
The place-name 'Eaton Constantine' does not refer to the Roman military presence; 'Eaton' means 'island town or settlement', and the land was held by Thomas de Cotentin from Cotentin Peninsula (in Normandy) in 1242.

== Notable people ==
The theologian Richard Baxter (1615–1691) lived here in his boyhood. His childhood home, now called Baxter's House (a private residence), is a 16th-century timber-framed house in the centre of the village.

Minor British fraudster and AWOL soldier John Vincent Cain (1907-1940) committed suicide in the grounds of Ranslett House (also a private residence) when apprehended by police.

== See also ==
- Listed buildings in Leighton and Eaton Constantine
