= The Loves of Joanna Godden =

- UK release poster by John Minton
- Directed by: Charles Frend
- Written by: H.E. Bates; Angus MacPhail
- Based on: the novel Joanna Godden by Sheila Kaye-Smith
- Produced by: Michael Balcon
- Starring: Googie Withers; Jean Kent; John McCallum; Derek Bond
- Cinematography: Douglas Slocombe
- Edited by: Michael Truman
- Music by: Ralph Vaughan Williams
- Distributed by: Ealing Studios
- Release date: 9 June 1947
- Running time: 89 minutes
- Country: United Kingdom
- Language: English
- Budget: £167,073
- Box office: £82,908 (UK)

The Loves of Joanna Godden is a 1947 British historical drama film directed by Charles Frend and produced by Michael Balcon. The screenplay was written by H. E. Bates and Angus MacPhail from the novel Joanna Godden (1921) by Sheila Kaye-Smith.

It stars Googie Withers, Jean Kent, John McCallum, Derek Bond, Chips Rafferty and Sonia Holm. Some scenes were shot by director Robert Hamer when Frend was ill, though he was uncredited. The music was composed by Ralph Vaughan Williams.

== Plot ==
In Edwardian Britain, a young woman has three suitors who seek her hand in marriage.

When Joanna Godden's father died, he bequeathed her a farm in Romney Marsh in Kent. Joanna is determined to run the farm herself. Her neighbour Arthur Alce (John McCallum), laughs at her ambitions, but loves her. Choosing a new shepherd, she allows physical attraction to a man to overcome her judgment as a farmer, and her scheme for cross-breeding sheep is unsuccessful. Her wealth gone, she turns to Arthur Alce for help – but not love; that she accepts from Martin Trevor (Derek Bond), a visitor from the world beyond the Marsh. But on the eve of their marriage, Martin dies.

== Cast ==
- Googie Withers as Joanna Godden
- Jean Kent as Ellen Godden
- John McCallum as Arthur Alce
- Derek Bond as Martin Trevor
- Henry Mollison as Harry Trevor
- Chips Rafferty as Collard
- Sonia Holm as Louise
- Josephine Stuart as Grace Wickens
- Frederick Piper as Isaac Turk
- Douglas Jefferies as Huggett

and the people of Romney Marsh.

== Production ==
The film was based on Joanna Godden, a novel by Sheila Kaye-Smith originally published in 1921. The book was popular enough for Kaye-Smith to write a sequel, Joanna Godden Married, published in 1926.

After World War Two, Ealing Studios decided to film the novel, with a screenplay written by H. E. Bates and Angus MacPhail. The film had an ending different from the novel.

The studio cast Googie Withers to star; she had been a hit in Pink String and Sealing Wax. Lead roles were given to Australians John McCallum, who had been put under long-term contract to Rank, and Chips Rafferty, who had just starred in The Overlanders for Ealing.

The casting of Withers and Kent was announced in July 1946. Filming took place in August and September 1946, with location filming in Kent.

Withers and McCallum fell in love during filming and later married. They named their first child "Joanna" in honour of the film.

== Reception ==
The film earned distributor's gross receipts of £82,908 in the UK of which £159,642 went to the producer.
