= Precious Bane =

1924 novel by Mary Webb

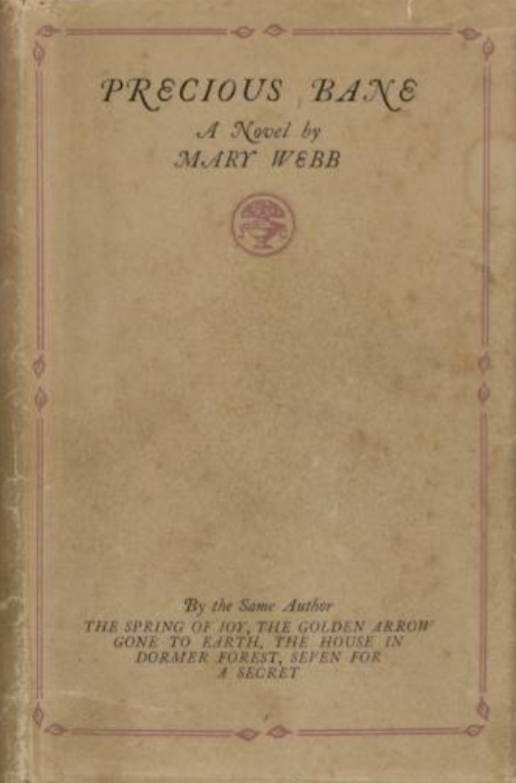
- First edition (publ. Jonathan Cape)
- Author: Mary Webb
- Language: English
- Publisher: Jonathan Cape
- Publication date: 1924
- Dewey Decimal: 823.912
- LC Class: PR6045.E2 P7

Precious Bane is an historical romance by Mary Webb, first published in 1924. It won the Prix Femina Vie Heureuse Prize in 1926. Webb wrote it while living in Hampstead Grove in London. It is noted for its graceful prose, in which human tragedy and lyrical descriptions of nature are interwoven, although neither is co-opted to reflect on the other. The beauty of nature, as a thing of value in itself, is an important theme and a source of the narrator’s spiritual strength.

== Synopsis ==
The story is set in rural Shropshire during the Napoleonic Wars. It is narrated by the central character, Prue Sarn, whose life is blighted by having a cleft lip. Only the weaver, Kester Woodseaves, perceives the beauty of her character, but Prue cannot believe herself worthy of him. Her brother Gideon is overridingly ambitious to attain wealth and power, regardless of who suffers while he does so. Gideon is set to wed his sweetheart Jancis, but he incurs the wrath of her father, the cruel and scheming self-proclaimed wizard Beguildy. An act of vengeance by Beguildy makes Gideon reject Jancis and tragedy engulfs them both. Prue is wrongly accused of murder and set upon by a mob, but Kester defies them and carries Prue away to the happiness she believed she could never possess because of her deformity.

=== Setting ===
The setting for the story has been attributed to the Meres of northern Shropshire, but is more likely to have been the area around Bomere Pool which was closer to the author's own home at Spring Cottage on Lyth Hill. The travel writer S. P. B. Mais recorded being taken to the pool to see the location of “Sarn” in the 1930s. These locations remained very rural at the time the novel was written, and Mary Webb was herself very much part of local country life there in the 1920s. Webb uses the rural setting to isolate Prue Sarn and her fellow characters from the larger world; at one point Prue tells us, "four years went by, and though a deal happened out in the world, naught happened to us.

=== Title ===
The title of the story has a double meaning. It is taken from John Milton's Paradise Lost (Book I, lines 690-692):

Let none admire
That riches grow in Hell; that Soyle may best
Deserve the precious bane.

It refers to the love of money, which, as Prue records, blights love and destroys life, but the title also refers to Prue's deformity, which she comes to recognize as an important source of her spiritual strength. In one of the most moving passages in the book, she relates: "...there came to me, I cannot tell whence, a most powerful sweetness that had never come to me afore... as if some creature made all of light had come on a sudden from a great way off, and nestled in my bosom.... Though it was so quiet, it was a great miracle, and it changed my life.... If I hadna had a hare-lip to frighten me away into my own lonesome soul, this would never have come to me.... Even while I was thinking this, out of nowhere suddenly came that lovely thing, and nestled in my heart, like a seed from the core of love."

== Main characters ==
The critic G. K. Chesterton wrote that the characters in this novel "live a hard life; they probably on occasion live a hungry life; they are quite capable in some circumstances of living a gross or ferocious life. But they do, in a very deep sense, live a full life."

- Prue Sarn – The narrator of the novel is in her teens when we first meet her. She is loving towards her mother, obedient to her demanding brother. The natural world of Shropshire offers her some consolation to the back-breaking work on the farm, and the fact that she can read and work with numbers is a source of pride and solace. Her "hare-shotten" lip is her own bane, and she bears it at times with dignity, at other times with deep feelings of shame. The English poet and critic Glen Cavaliero writes that "...Prue is spirited and stoical, with a vein of humor and no self-pity: her hare-lip is a source of wonder to her as much as heartbreak."
- Gideon Sarn – A few years older than Prue, he inherited both his father's farm and cruel temperament. He is Prue's opposite number, taking no delight in nature, and showing little affection for his aging mother. Above all else he is motivated by money, and relentlessly works the farm, and Prue, to get ahead. His single-minded determination to become rich is symbolized in part by his decision to put most of his fields in wheat (called corn in the book in accordance with British usage), the crop that was at the time the most lucrative.
- Beguildy - Owner of a neighboring farm, a man more committed to his wizardry and spells than to his fields and crops. A poor or more likely lazy farmer, he is often gone for days at a time, working charms and spells believed to heal the sick and injured in the community. He teaches Prue to read, write and work with numbers, but shows little care for his wife and daughter.
- Jancis Beguildy - The wizard's daughter and Gideon Sarn's intended wife, plump, blonde with a lush, pleasing mouth always forming a lovely "oh."
- Missis Beguildy - Beguildy's wife who fears her husband and yet does not hesitate to collude with Gideon and Jancis in their plans to be together. She is crafty in her methods to get her husband out of the house for days at a time, and she is sharp in her observations of the people in the community.
- Kester Woodseaves - He is a skilled itinerant weaver, making his living by traveling through Shropshire, weaving in the homes and farms. He is intelligent and compassionate - he prevents a bull baiting from taking place on a market day in town, but pays dearly for his efforts. He is a discerning judge of character, quickly recognizing Prue's qualities despite her deformed lip.

== Adaptations ==
A planned film adaptation by the Rank Organisation in 1947, to be directed by Robert Siodmak and featuring Ann Todd and David Farrar, was abandoned when the star Robert Donat withdrew from the production. In 1957 the book was made into a six-part BBC television drama series starring Patrick Troughton and Daphne Slater. In March 1957 Earl St John of Rank said his company might make a film of the novel starring Virginia McKenna but none was made.

Under its French title Sarn, it was produced as a television play by French Television ORTF in 1968, with Dominique Labourier as Prue, Josep Maria Flotats as Gedeon and Pierre Vaneck as Kester; the director was Claude Santelli.

In 1989 it was again adapted for British television by the BBC, directed by Christopher Menaul and starring John Bowe, Clive Owen and Janet McTeer.

== Bibliography ==
- Greco, Joseph. The File on Robert Siodmak in Hollywood, 1941-1951. Universal-Publishers, 1999.
- Wade, Christopher. The Streets of Hampstead. Camden History Society, 2000.
