= Lyth Hill Local Nature Reserve =

Nature reserve in Shropshire, England

Coordinates: 52.655°N 2.787°W

Lyth Hill is a Local Nature Reserve in Shropshire, England which contains valuable habitats for wildlife and is associated with the novelist and poet Mary Webb.

== Location ==
Lyth Hill is located south of the large village of Bayston Hill, just south of the larger town of Shrewsbury, at grid reference SJ 475070.

== Recreational activities ==
There are several walking paths, ranging from easy to difficult, with a specially designed route for families.

Sky watching at Lyth Hill is common due to the low light pollution levels.

== Wildlife ==
The site has a variety of habitats, including woodland, scrub, and grassland areas which are valuable to wildlife and act as a refuge area from the surrounding towns. The meadows have been managed by grazing a small herd of Dexter cattle.

== History ==
In the past this was a site of ropemaking, with a windmill built in 1835 by John Carter being used to make the hemp and flax fibres employed in the trade. Around 1920, a subsequent owner of the mill, named Hayway, removed the machinery. A house called Rope Walk on that part of Lyth Hill was the home from 1956 until his death in 1977 of Major General Eric Miles.

In 1917, the poet and novelist Mary Webb bought a plot on Lyth Hill, where she built a small bungalow named Spring Cottage. While living there she wrote the novel The House in Dormer Forest (1920) and delighted in the Shropshire countryside, which she was to recall in later novels and poems.

An archaeological survey of the countryside site in 2005 found former field boundaries and paths that are no longer used or seen as landscape features. One feature that was regarded as noteworthy was a disused quarry.

In September 2011 a Shropshire sky watch team, who had set up their cameras to witness the re-entry of a research satellite, instead reported a strange phenomenon—a red beam of light flashing down at the ground, accompanied by a crackling electric sound. After further investigation, it was suggested that this may have been caused by a military helicopter with the ability to fire lasers at the ground.
