= The House in Dormer Forest =

1920 novel by Mary Webb

- 1929 US edition (publ. E. P. Dutton)
- Author: Mary Webb
- Language: English
- Genre: Regional drama
- Publisher: Hutchinson (UK); George H. Doran (US)
- Publication date: 1920
- Publication place: United Kingdom
- Media type: Print

The House in Dormer Forest is a 1920 romance novel by the British writer Mary Webb. It was part of a wave of regional novels set across Britain, in Webb's case in her native Shropshire. She wrote it while living at her home near Bayston Hill. It was one of several works that inspired the later parody novel Cold Comfort Farm by Stella Gibbons.

== Synopsis ==
The plot follows the lives of the Darke family, now headed by Solomon Darke, who have lived in the now crumbling Dormer House since the Elizabethan Era.

== Bibliography ==
- Baldick, Chris. Literature of the 1920s: Writers Among the Ruins, Volume 3. Edinburgh University Press, 2015.
- Radford, Andrew. The Lost Girls: Demeter-Persephone and the Literary Imagination, 1850-1930. BRILL, 2007.
- Stringer, Jenny & Sutherland, John. The Oxford Companion to Twentieth-century Literature in English. Oxford University Press, 1996.
