= Joanna Godden =

1921 novel by Sheila Kaye-Smith

- Author: Sheila Kaye-Smith
- Language: English
- Genre: Thriller
- Publication date: 1921
- Publication place: United Kingdom
- Media type: Print

Joanna Godden is a 1921 thriller novel by the British writer Sheila Kaye-Smith. It is a drama set amongst the sheep farmers of Romney Marsh in Kent.

== Adaptation ==
In 1947, the novel served as the basis for the film The Loves of Joanna Godden directed by Charles Frend and starring Googie Withers in the title role.

== Bibliography ==
- Margaret Butler. Film and Community in Britain and France: From La Règle Du Jeu to Room at the Top. I.B.Tauris, 2004.
