= Listed buildings in Leighton and Eaton Constantine =

Leighton and Eaton Constantine is a civil parish in Shropshire, England. It contains 37 listed buildings that are recorded in the National Heritage List for England. Of these, two are at Grade II*, the middle of the three grades, and the others are at Grade II, the lowest grade. The parish contains the villages of Leighton, Eaton Constantine, and Garmston, and the surrounding countryside. Most of the listed buildings are houses, cottages and farmhouses, a high proportion of which are timber framed. The other listed buildings include two churches, one of which has listed memorials in the churchyard, a country house and associated structures, a milestone, and five cast iron pumps.

== Key ==
Grade	Criteria
II*	Particularly important buildings of more than special interest
II	Buildings of national importance and special interest

== Buildings ==
Name and location	Photograph	Date	Notes	Grade
Baxter's House; 52.65251°N 2.59403°W	—	14th century	A farmhouse, later a private house, it was remodelled and extended in the 16th century. The house is timber framed with brick infill and a tile roof. There is a T-shaped plan, consisting of the original three-bay hall range with one storey and an attic, and the later gabled cross-wing, which has two bays, two storeys and an attic. The upper floor and the attic of the gable end are jettied with moulded bressumers. The gable end contains mullioned and transomed windows, the windows in the hall range are casements, and there are two gabled eaves dormers. The house was at one time the home of the theologian Richard Baxter.	II*
Home Farmhouse; 52.64408°N 2.56996°W	—	Mid 14th century	A farmhouse, later a private house, it was extended in the 16th century and refaced in the 18th century. There are two storeys and an L-shaped plan, originally with a timber framed hall range, a four-bay range was added at right angles in the 16th century, and the house was refaced in red brick in the 18th century, leaving some exposed timber framing at the rear. The windows are casements.	II
Eye Farmhouse; 52.64223°N 2.58921°W	—	14th or 15th century (probable)	The farmhouse was remodelled in the 16th century and later extended. It is timber framed with plaster infill on a brick plinth, and has a tile roof. There are two storeys and an attic, the windows are casements, and there are four raking dormers at the rear. Inside are inglenook fireplaces.	II
Wayside; 52.65257°N 2.59451°W		15th or 16th century	A cottage that was remodelled in the 17th century and altered later. It is timber framed with cruck construction, brick and plastered infill, partly rebuilt in brick and stone, and with a thatched roof, hipped on the right. There is one storey and an attic, and three bays, the middle bay gabled. On the front is a gabled porch, and most of the windows are casements. Inside are three true cruck trusses.	II
Stilgo Farmhouse; 52.64597°N 2.57628°W	—	Late 16th century	The farmhouse was extended in the 19th century. The original part is timber framed with brick infill on a brick plinth, the extension is in brown brick, and the roof is tiled. There is one storey and an attic, the original part has three bays, and the extension is a projecting wing on the right. There is a lean-to porch in the angle, the windows are casements, and there are three gabled eaves dormers with fretted bargeboards.	II
Yew Tree Cottage; 52.65147°N 2.58341°W		Late 16th century	A farmhouse, later a private house, it was extended in 1622 and later. The house is timber framed with brick infill on a brick plinth, and has a tile roof. There are two storeys, originally there was a hall range of 2½ bays and a two-bay cross-wing on the left, in 1622 a twin-gabled extension was added in the angle, and in the 19th century a brick extension was added at the rear. The house now has a front of three gables, a central gabled porch, casement windows, and a diamond-shaped datestone in the middle gable. Inside is an inglenook fireplace.	II
19 Eaton Constantine; 52.65396°N 2.59176°W	—	Early 17th century	The house, at one time a public house, has been altered and extended. The original part is timber framed with brick infill, the rebuilding and extension is in brick and stone, and the roof is thatched. There is one storey with attics, the original part has three bays, there is an extension to the left and a lean-to on the right. The windows are casements, and there are three gabled eaves dormers.	II
Town's End Cottage; 52.64731°N 2.57787°W	—	Early 17th century	The cottage was extended in the 19th century. It is timber framed with brick infill, extensions in brick, and a tile roof that has gables with fretted bargeboards, finials, and ornamental cresting. Originally it had a T-shaped plan with one storey and an attic, and a central 17th-century gabled block flanked by wings, and the 19th-century extension consists of a single-storey wing at the rear. The windows are casements with cast iron patterned glazing, and there is a gabled eaves dormer.	II
Holly Cottage and Walnut Cottage; 52.65188°N 2.58254°W	—	Mid 17th century	A house, later two cottages, it is timber framed with brick infill and a thatched roof. There is one storey and attics, and two bays. On the front of each cottage is a gabled porch, the windows are casements, and there are two raking dormers.	II
Morrellswood Farmhouse; 52.65379°N 2.54814°W	—	17th century (probable)	The farmhouse has been considerably altered and extended. It is basically timber framed, it has been encased and rebuilt in brick, and it has a tile roof. The house originally had an L-shaped plan, an outbuilding was added at the rear and later incorporated, and in the 20th century extensions were added at the rear. There are two storeys, and the windows are casements, some with segmental heads.	II
Old Post Office; 52.64562°N 2.57616°W		Mid 17th century	The house, at one time a post office, was extended in the 19th century. It is timber framed with brick infill, extensions in brick, and a tile roof that has gables with fretted bargeboards, finials, and ornamental cresting. There is one storey and an attic, and a roughly T-shaped plan, consisting of a central 17th-century gabled wing flanked by 19th-century extensions. The windows are casements with cast iron patterned glazing, on the ground floor is an oriel window, and there are two gabled dormers.	II
Orchard Cottage; 52.65148°N 2.58372°W	—	17th century	The cottage was considerably altered and extended in the 19th and 20th centuries. It is basically timber framed, and largely rebuilt and extended in brick. There is one storey and attics, the left part has a thatched roof, and the roof of the right part, with a single-storey cross-wing at the rear at the right, and considerable later extensions is tiled. On the front is a gabled porch, the windows are casements, in the left part is a gabled eaves dormer, and in the right part is a gabled half-dormer. Inside is an inglenook fireplace.	II
Brockholes Bank; 52.65261°N 2.56968°W	—	Late 17th century	A cottage that was later altered and extended. It is timber framed with brick infill on a rendered plinth, and has a tile roof. There is one storey and an attic, three bays, and a single-storey brick lean-to at the rear. The windows are casements, and there are three flat-roofed eaves dormers.	II
Roden Memorial; 52.64260°N 2.57359°W	—	c. 1680	The memorial is in the churchyard of St Mary's Church, and is to the memory of Susan Roden. It is a rectangular headstone in sandstone, and has a crudely carved top.	II
St Mary's Church, Leighton; 52.64265°N 2.57367°W		1714–16	The church, in the grounds of Leighton Hall, incorporates some earlier material, and was restored in the late 19th century. It is in red brick on a sandstone plinth, and has a tile roof with coped verges. The church consists of a nave, a south porch with an adjacent vestry, both gabled, and a chancel. At the west end is a belfry with weatherboarding and a pyramidal roof. Three of the original round-headed windows remain, the others having been replaced with Gothic-style windows in the restoration.	II*
Churchyard wall 52.64246°N 2.57370°W	—	Early 18th century	The wall, which was repaired in the 19th century, is in red brick with repairs in purplish-brown brick. It surrounds the roughly circular churchyard of St Mary's Church, Leighton, and is between 0.8 metres (2 ft 7 in) and 2.5 metres (8 ft 2 in) high.	II
Garmston House; 52.65126°N 2.58230°W	—	Early to mid 18th century	A farmhouse, later a private house, with later additions. It is in red brick on a stepped plinth, with a tile roof. There are two storeys and an attic, and five bays. In the centre is a porch, the ground floor windows are casements with segmental heads, in the upper floor are sash windows, and in the roof are two gabled dormers. At the rear are two hip roofed projections and a central gable containing an illegible datestone.	II
Two memorial plates 52.64261°N 2.57353°W	—	c. 1750	The memorial plates are in the churchyard of St Mary's Church, and are to the memory of members of the Ward family. They are in cast iron, rectangular, and recumbent. The earlier plate is decorated with a swagged urn and has raised lettering, and the other, dating from about 1777, has an inscription and is otherwise plain.	II
Leighton Lodge; 52.64358°N 2.57271°W	—	Mid 18th century	The house was extended in the 19th century by additions at the rear, and is in red brick with a tile roof. The original range has a moulded wooden eaves cornice, and the additions have a dentilled eaves cornice. There are three storeys, the front has three bays, the windows are sashes with raised keystones, and the central entrance has a porch with a pediment.	II
The Villa; 52.64395°N 2.57336°W	—	Mid to late 18th century	A remodelling of an earlier house, with some remaining timber framing with weatherboarding at the rear. The 18th-century part is in red brick with a dentil eaves cornice and a tile roof. There are two storeys and an attic, and a front if two bays. The central doorway has a gabled porch, and the windows are casements.	II
Gate piers, gates and railings, Leighton Hall; 52.64395°N 2.57336°W		Late 18th century	The two pairs of gate piers flank the entrance to the drive to the hall. They are in sandstone, and each pier has a square plan, a moulded plinth and capping, and a globe finial. The gates are in wrought iron, and outside the piers are low quadrant stone walls with iron railings.	II
Leighton Hall; 52.64243°N 2.57439°W	—	1778	A country house, it was extended and remodelled in 1887–88. The house is in red brick with stone dressings, rusticated angle quoins, a coped eaves parapet, and a hipped tile roof with a ridge of red brick. There are two storeys and attics, the south (entrance) front has eight bays, the outer bays containing canted bay windows. Between these is a Classical-style portico with three elliptical arches, and a balustrade with a coat of arms. On the returns are similar bay windows, and at the rear is a service range.	II
Stable block, Leighton Hall; 52.64335°N 2.57189°W	—	1778	The stable block was remodelled in 1888, and has since been converted for domestic use. It is in red brick with a dentil eaves cornice and tile roofs. There are four ranges around a rectangular courtyard, the south range with one storey and the others with two. In the west range is a round-headed archway with a raised keystone and voussoirs, flanked by oculi and inscription panels. Above it is a roundel and pyramidal roof surmounted by a clock tower that has an octagonal wooden cupola with a lead cap. The windows are casements, some inserted into blind round-headed stable arches.	II
Rathbon Memorial; 52.64260°N 2.57361°W	—	c. 1812	The memorial is in the churchyard of St Mary's Church, and is to the memory of Mary Ann Rathbon. It is a pedestal tomb in sandstone, and has a rectangular plan, tapering to the top. The tomb has a moulded plinth, an urn finial, and a recessed inscription panel on the south side.	II
Langley Memorial; 52.64260°N 2.57372°W	—	c. 1814	The memorial is in the churchyard of St Mary's Church, and is to the memory of Robert Langley and his wife. It is a chest tomb in sandstone, and has a rectangular plan. The tomb has a moulded plinth, a chamfered top ledger, and fluted corner pilasters. There are recessed semicircular panels on the north and south sides, one with an inscription, and raised blank panels on the east and west sides.	II
Davies Memorial; 52.64254°N 2.57380°W	—	c. 1815	The memorial is in the churchyard of St Mary's Church, and is to the memory of John Davies and his wife. It is a chest tomb in sandstone, and has a rectangular plan. The tomb has a moulded plinth, a pedimented top ledger, fluted corner pilasters, and moulded inscription panels.	II
Reynolds Memorial; 52.64281°N 2.57346°W	—	c. 1816	The memorial is in the churchyard of St Mary's Church, and is to the memory of Cornelius Reynolds and his wife. It is a pedestal tomb in cast iron, and has a rectangular plan. The tomb has a moulded plinth and capping, inscriptions panels with fluted corner spandrels, and on the chamfered top is an urn. The tomb is enclosed by railings on a brick base.	II
Group of four chest tombs 52.64299°N 2.57270°W	—	c. 1819	The chest tombs are in the churchyard of St Mary's Church, and are to the memory of members of the Pothan and Maen families. They are in sandstone and each has a rectangular plan, They all have moulded plinths and chamfered top ledgers, the two to the south have square corner pilasters, and the two to the north have fluted corner pilasters.	II
Kynnersley Arms Public House, mill and furnace 52.64636°N 2.57720°W		Early 19th century	The public house, which dates from the late 19th century, is in purplish-brown brick with a hipped slate roofs. It has two storeys and three bays, and a recessed two-bay block to the left. On the front of the main block is a canted bay window, and there is a pediment above the middle bay. At the rear are the remains of an earlier mill and furnace in red brick with a tile roof. It contains a cast iron undershot wheel.	II
Ranslett House; 52.64757°N 2.60446°W	—	Early 19th century	A farmhouse in red and yellow brick, with a hipped slate roof, and wide eaves on wooden brackets. There are two storeys, and a front of four bays, the middle two bays projecting. The windows are sashes, and there is a conservatory porch on the left return.	II
Milestone; 52.64596°N 2.57669°W	—	Early to mid 19th century	The milestone is on the southwest side of the B4380 road. It is in limestone, and consists of a rectangular stone with a rounded top. On it is a cast iron plate inscribed with the distances in miles to Shrewsbury and to Ironbridge.	II
St Mary's Church, Eaton Constantine; 52.65308°N 2.59687°W		1847–48	The church was built on the site of a medieval church. It is built in limestone and conglomerate and has tiled roofs with coped verges. The church consists of a nave with a south porch, and a chancel with a north vestry. On the west gable is a bellcote, the windows are lancets, and between the bays of the nave are buttresses.	II
Pump, Garmston House; 52.65126°N 2.58250°W	—	Mid to late 19th century	The pump is adjacent to the house, and is in cast iron. It has a plain shaft with a splayed spout, a fluted top, a fluted domed cap, and a curved handle.	II
Pump, Walnut Cottage; 52.65184°N 2.58261°W	—	Mid to late 19th century	The pump is adjacent to the house, and is in cast iron. It has a plain shaft, a top with a straight spout, and a slightly curved handle.	II
Pump, Wayside; 52.65254°N 2.59440°W	—	Mid to late 19th century	The pump is adjacent to the house, and is in cast iron. It has a plain shaft with a fluted top, a plain spout, and a curved handle.	II
Village pump and wall 52.65873°N 2.58741°W	—	Mid to late 19th century	The pump is set into a recess in a sandstone wall. It is in cast iron, and has a plain shaft with a splayed spout, a fluted top, and a curved handle.	II
Pump, Rushton Cottages; 52.66180°N 2.57521°W	—	Late 19th century	The pump is adjacent to the house, and is in cast iron. It has a plain double-shaft with a central spout, and a curved handle at the top.	II
