= William Wingfield (cricketer, born 1834) =

Welsh-born clergyman and cricketer

William Wingfield (30 September 1834 – 18 April 1913) was a Welsh-born clergyman and a cricketer who played first-class cricket for Cambridge University, Cambridgeshire and the Marylebone Cricket Club (MCC) between 1855 and 1862. He was born at Llanllwchaiarn, Newtown, Powys and died at Coton Hill, Shrewsbury, Shropshire.

Wingfield was educated at Rossall School and at Trinity College, Cambridge.

As a cricketer, Wingfield was a right-handed middle-order batsman and, in his early career at least, a wicketkeeper. He cemented his place in the 1855 University team with an innings of 69 in only his second first-class game, the match against the MCC, and this remained his highest score. He played in the University Match against Oxford University in each of his three seasons at Cambridge, but only in his last year did he make much impact, though his 54 in Cambridge's second innings was insufficient to prevent a defeat. Cricket was not his only sport at Cambridge: he won a Blue as cox of the Cambridge rowing eight at Henley in 1855 and was then cox of the successful Cambridge boat in the Boat Race 1856.

Wingfield also played for the Gentlemen of the South team and was a county cricketer for Cambridgeshire, and, from 1855 to 1879, Shropshire. For the latter he appeared in 86 matches, made a total 2,317 runs with a best match score of 89 runs, and took 15 wickets. Within Shropshire he played club cricket for Shrewsbury and Ludlow.

Wingfield graduated from Cambridge University with a Bachelor of Arts degree in 1857, and this converted to a Master of Arts in 1861. He was ordained as a deacon in the Church of England in 1859 and as a priest the following year. From 1860 to 1863, he was vicar of Ford, Shropshire; from 1863 to his retirement in 1901, he was vicar of Leighton, Shropshire.

Wingfield married in April 1864 Selina Rachel, daughter of Colonel Frederick Hill.
