= Sheila Kaye-Smith =

English writer (1887–1956)

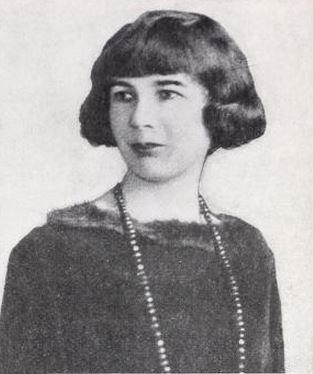
- Kaye-Smith in 1922
- Born: 4 February 1887; St Leonards-on-Sea, Sussex, England
- Died: 14 January 1956 (aged 68); Northiam, Sussex, England
- Occupations: Novelist and poet

Sheila Kaye-Smith (4 February 1887 – 14 January 1956) was an English writer, known for her many novels set in the borderlands of Sussex and Kent in the English regional tradition. Her 1923 book The End of the House of Alard became a best-seller, and gave her prominence; it was followed by other successes, and her books enjoyed worldwide sales.

Interest in her novel Joanna Godden (1921) was revived after it was adapted as a film titled The Loves of Joanna Godden (1947), which had a different conclusion. In the 1980s, this novel and Susan Spray were reissued by Virago press.

== Life ==
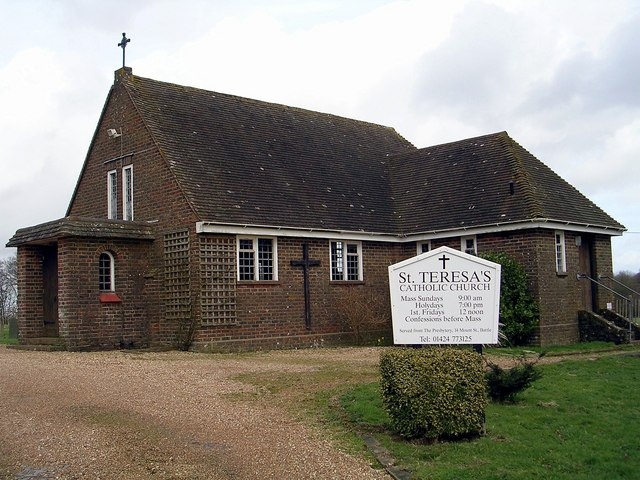
St Theresa of Lisieux Church

The daughter of a physician and his wife, Sheila Kaye-Smith was born in St Leonards-on-Sea, near Hastings, in Sussex. She lived most of her life in that county, apart from a period in London in her youth. She was a distant relative of writer M. M. Kaye (The Far Pavilions).

In 1924 Kaye-Smith married Theodore Penrose Fry, an Anglican clergyman. The following year she published a book on Anglo-Catholicism. By 1929 she and her husband had converted to the Roman Catholic Church. Penrose Fry had to give up his Anglican curacy, and they moved to Northiam in Sussex, where they lived in a large converted oast house.

Soon afterwards, having noted their own and some of their neighbours' need for a nearby church, they bought land on which they established a Catholic chapel dedicated to St Theresa of Lisieux, at Northiam. It still has a large congregation. Kaye-Smith is buried in the churchyard there.

Their house, Little Doucegrove, was later owned by novelist Rumer Godden, another writer who had converted to Catholicism.

A new biography of Kaye-Smith by Shaun Cooper, The Shining Cord, was published by Country Books in June 2017.

== Writing ==
Kaye-Smith's fiction was noted for being rooted in rural concerns: the nineteenth-century agricultural depression, farming, legacies, land rents, strikes, the changing position of women, and the effects of industrialisation on the countryside and provincial life. Admirers of her work included her close friend G. B. Stern. They collaborated on two books about authors Jane Austen, Thomas Hardy, and Noël Coward.

Kaye-Smith's novels encompassed more than one genre of fiction. Her earliest novels partly fit into the 'earthy' rural category, together with those of Mary E Mann, Mary Webb, D. H. Lawrence, and Thomas Hardy. This genre inspired Stella Gibbons's parody Cold Comfort Farm (1932).

Kaye-Smith's response to the latter was amusement: she placed a good-natured riposte in her novel A Valiant Woman (1939), set in a rapidly modernising village undergoing some gentrification. (Pearce, 2008). A subplot has an upper middle-class teenager, Lucia, turn from writing twee rural poems to undertake the great Urban Proletarian Novel: "… all about people who aren't married going to bed in a Manchester slum and talking about the Means Test." Her philistine grandmother is dismayed, as she prefers cosy rural novels and knows Lucia is ignorant of proletarian life:

That silly child! Did she really think she could write a novel? Well, of course, modern novels might encourage her to think so. There was nothing written nowadays worth reading. The book on her knee was called Cold Comfort Farm and had been written by a young woman who was said to be very clever and had won an important literary prize. But she couldn't get on with it at all. It was about life on a farm, but the girl obviously knew nothing about country life. To anyone who, like herself, had always lived in the country, the whole thing was too ridiculous and impossible for words.

Kaye-Smith's descriptions of the Sussex countryside, coast and marsh are still regarded as some of the finest. Several of her heroines are single parents and most face various gender-related trials, reflecting her early feminism as well as influences such as George Moore and Thomas Hardy (Pearce, 2004). Kaye-Smith also produced many short stories, and her journalism was published in national journals, magazines and newspapers.

Joanna Godden (1921), arguably Kaye-Smith's most famous novel, was set in Romney Marsh. More than two decades later, a film adaptation was made, released in 1947 as The Loves of Joanna Godden. Starring Googie Withers, it had a score by noted composer Ralph Vaughan Williams. The screenplay by H. E. Bates includes however a very different conclusion to the story.

Kaye-Smith's later books increasingly reflected her personal religious preoccupations, featuring characters tussling with spiritual crises and conversions within subtle discussions of the differences among Anglicanism, Anglo-Catholicism, and Catholicism. Her plots (e.g. in The Lardners and the Laurelwoods, A Valiant Woman, and Mrs Gailey) continued to reflect pre- and post-WW2 preoccupations of women's "middle-brow" fiction of the time. She explored national anxieties about social class, divorce, and women's "role", within a mainly rural but rapidly modernising milieu (Pearce, 2004, 2005). Her books share similarities with contemporary writers such as Barbara Pym, Marghanita Laski and H. E. Bates. Her descriptions of farming practices and economics, and village vernacular, are noted as particularly detailed and accurate for this genre (Cavalliero, 1977).

Joanna Godden and Susan Spray were reissued in the 1980s by feminist publishing house Virago. Since then her books are out of print, but are readily available on the used book market.

== Literary society ==
The Sheila Kaye-Smith literary society is based in St Leonards-on-Sea, meets regularly, and has published a chronology of her life and works, as well producing an annual journal, The Gleam. There are extensive archives relating to Sheila Kaye-Smith in West Sussex County Library in Chichester.

== Works ==
- The Tramping Methodist (1908)
- Starbrace (1909)
- Three against the World (1909)
- Spell Land: The Story of a Sussex Farm (1910)
- Samuel Richardson (1911)
- Isle of Thorns (1913)
- Willow's Forge and other poems (1914)
- Sussex Gorse (1916)
- John Galsworthy (1916) biography
- The Challenge to Sirius (1917)
- Little England (1918)
- Tamarisk Town (1919)
- Green Apple Harvest (1920)
- Joanna Godden (1921)
- Saints in Sussex (1923) poems
- The End of the House of Alard (1923)
- Anglo-Catholicism (1925)
- The George and the Crown (1925)
- The Mirror of the Months (1925)
- Joanna Godden Married and other Stories (1926)
- Iron and Smoke (1928)
- A Wedding Morn (1928)
- The Village Doctor (1929)
- Shepherds in Sackcloth (1930)
- Songs Late and Early (1931) poems
- Susan Spray (1931)
- The Children's Summer (1932)
- The Ploughman's Progress (1933)
- Superstition Corner (1934)
- Gallybird (1934)
- Selina is Older (1935)
- Rose Deeprose (1936)
- Three Ways Home (1937) autobiography
- Faithful Stranger and Other Stories (1938) short stories
- The Valiant Woman (1939)
- Ember Lane (1940)
- Tambourine, Trumpet and Drum (1943)
- Talking of Jane Austen (1943) with G. B. Stern
- Kitchen Fugue (1945)
- The Lardners and the Laurelwoods (1948)
- The Happy Tree (1949)
- The Treasures of the Snow (1949)
- More Talk of Jane Austen (1950) with G. B. Stern
- Mrs. Gailey (1951)
- The Hidden Son (1953)
- The Weald of Kent and Sussex (1953) topography
- Quartet in Heaven (1953) religious biography
- The View from the Parsonage (1954)
- All the Books of My Life (1956) autobiography
