= Gladys Mary Coles =

British poet and novelist (1935–2024)

- Born: 31 May 1935; Everton, Liverpool, England
- Died: 7 October 2024 (aged 89); Wales, United Kingdom
- Occupations: Poet, novelist, biographer, editor, tutor
- Notable work: Flower of Light, Clay, The Echoing Green
- Spouse: Howard Edger Coles (died 2020)
- Children: 2

Gladys Mary Coles (31 May 1935 – 7 October 2024) was a British poet, novelist and biographer. She published nine poetry collections, a novel, and several anthologies, and was a leading authority on the writer Mary Webb.

== Biography ==
Coles was born in Everton, Liverpool, on 31 May 1935. During the Second World War, she spent much of her time in Wales, a region that remained significant throughout her life. She later lived in West Kirby, Wirral. Coles was married to Howard Edger Coles, who died in 2020. She had two daughters, Kathryn and Lyndsay, and a grandson, Nathan. Coles died on 7 October 2024 in Wales, aged 89.

== Career ==
Coles published nine poetry collections, including The Echoing Green (2001), which features sequences inspired by the Welsh-Shropshire border and Whixall Moss. Her frequently explored themes related to Merseyside, Wales and Shropshire. Her name is inscribed on the Literary Pavement at Liverpool Central Library.

- Poetry and Themes: Coles published nine poetry collections, including The Echoing Green (2001), which features sequences inspired by the Welsh-Shropshire border and Whixall Moss. Her work frequently explores themes related to Merseyside, Wales, and Shropshire.
- Editorial Work: She compiled and edited several anthologies, such as Both Sides of the River: Merseyside in Poetry and Prose (1993) and The Poet’s View, a collection of poems based on paintings in Liverpool’s Walker Art Gallery.
- Novel Writing: Her first novel, Clay (2010), is set during and after the First World War and was longlisted for the 2011 Wales Book of the Year.
- Mary Webb Scholarship: Coles was president of the Mary Webb Society from 1989 until her death and was instrumental in its formation in 1972. She authored Flower of Light (1978), regarded as the standard biography of Mary Webb, and edited Selected Poems of Mary Webb (2001)

She compiled and edited several anthologies, including Both Sides of the River: Merseyside in Poetry and Prose (1993) and The Poet’s View, a collection of poems based on paintings in Liverpool’s Walker Art Gallery. Her first novel, Clay (2010), is set during and after the First World War and was longlisted for the 2011 Wales Book of the Year.

Coles was president of the Mary Webb Society from 1989 until her death and was instrumental in its formation in 1972. She wrote Flower of Light (1978), regarded as the standard biography of Mary Webb, and edited Selected Poems of Mary Webb (2001). She also published Mary Webb (1990) and Mary Webb and Her Shropshire World.

She lectured in creative writing at Liverpool John Moores University and the University of Liverpool's Continuing Education department, and ran the literary press Headland. Coles was awarded a PhD in Creative Writing by Liverpool John Moores University in 2010.

Her work appeared in various anthologies and she represented British poetry in the Euro-Literature Project.

== Selected works ==
- The Sounding Circle, and other poems (1975)
- Sinerva, and other poems (1977)
- Mary Webb: Collected Prose and Poems (editor, 1977)
- Flower of Light: A Biography of Mary Webb (1978)
- Selected Poems of Mary Webb (editor, 1981)
- The Snow Bird Sequence (poems, 1983)
- Stoat, in Winter (poems, 1984)
- Snows in Stone (poems, 1985)
- Leafburners: New and Selected Poems (1986)
- Mary Webb (biography, 1990)
- The Glass Island (poems, 1992)
- Both Sides of the River: Merseyside in Poetry and Prose (editor, 1993)
- The Echoing Green (poems, 2001)
- Wirral: An Anthology (editor, 2002)
- Song of the Butcher Bird (poems, 2007)
- Between Fields and Stars (editor, 2008)
- Clay (novel, 2010)
