= Seven for a Secret =

1922 novel by Mary Webb

- First edition (UK)
- Author: Mary Webb
- Language: English
- Genre: Regional drama
- Publisher: Hutchinson (UK); George H. Doran (US)
- Publication date: 1922
- Publication place: United Kingdom
- Media type: Print

Seven for a Secret is a 1922 romance novel by the British writer Mary Webb. She wrote to Thomas Hardy asking if she might dedicate the novel to him, to which he agreed. As with her other novels it takes place in her native Shropshire. The title is taken from the traditional nursery rhyme One for Sorrow.

== Bibliography ==
- Baldick, Chris. Literature of the 1920s: Writers Among the Ruins, Volume 3. Edinburgh University Press, 2015.
- Radford, Andrew. The Lost Girls: Demeter-Persephone and the Literary Imagination, 1850-1930. BRILL, 2007.
- Stringer, Jenny & Sutherland, John. The Oxford Companion to Twentieth-century Literature in English. Oxford University Press, 1996.
