= Mary Webb =

English novelist (1881–1927)

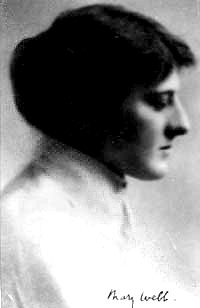
- Portrait of Mary Webb
- Born: Mary Gladys Meredith; 15 March 1881; Leighton, Shropshire, England
- Died: 8 October 1927 (aged 46); St Leonards-on-Sea, England
- Occupations: Novelist, poet
- Known for: Author of Precious Bane, Gone to Earth

Mary Gladys Webb (25 March 1881 – 8 October 1927) was an English romance novelist and poet of the early 20th century, whose work is set chiefly in the Shropshire countryside and among Shropshire characters and people whom she knew. Her novels have been successfully dramatized, most notably the film Gone to Earth in 1950 by Michael Powell and Emeric Pressburger based on the novel of the same title.

== Life ==
She was born Mary Gladys Meredith in 1881 at Leighton Lodge in the Shropshire village of Leighton, where she was baptised at St Mary's parish church, 8 miles (13 km) southeast of Shrewsbury. Her father, George Edward Meredith, a private schoolteacher, inspired his daughter with his own love of literature and the local countryside. Mary explored the countryside around her childhood home and developed a sense of detailed observation and description, of both people and places, which later infused her poetry and prose.

At the age of one year, she moved with her parents to Much Wenlock, where they lived at a house called The Grange outside the town. Mary was taught by her father, then sent to a finishing school for girls at Southport in 1895. Webb became a vegetarian as a child and loathed the slaughter of animals. Her parents moved the family again in Shropshire, north to Stanton upon Hine Heath in 1896, before settling in 1902 at Meole Brace, now on the outskirts of Shrewsbury. It was at Stanton she began writing poems and articles for the local parish magazine.

At the age of 20, she developed symptoms of Graves' disease, a thyroid disorder that resulted in bulging protuberant eyes and throat goitre. It caused ill health throughout her life and probably contributed to her early death. This affliction resulted in her being empathic with the suffering. She is considered to have created a fictional counterpart in the disfiguring harelip of Prue Sarn, the heroine of Precious Bane.

Webb's first published writing was a five-verse poem, written on hearing news of the Shrewsbury rail accident in October 1907. Her brother, Kenneth Meredith, so liked the poem and thought it potentially comforting for those affected by the disaster that, without her knowledge, he took it to the newspaper offices of the Shrewsbury Chronicle, which printed the poem anonymously. Mary, who usually burnt her early poems, was appalled before learning that the newspaper had received appreciative letters from its readers.

On 12 June 1912, Webb married Henry Bertram Law Webb (1885-1939), a teacher, at Meole Brace's Holy Trinity parish church. At first, he supported her literary interests. They lived for a time in Weston-super-Mare, before moving back to Mary's beloved Shropshire, where they worked as market gardeners until Henry secured a job as a teacher, first at Chester, then at the Priory Grammar School for Boys in Shrewsbury.

The couple lived briefly in Rose Cottage in Hinton Lane and then at The Nills in the village of Pontesbury between the years 1914 and 1916, during which time she wrote The Golden Arrow. Her time in the village is celebrated by the eponymously named Mary Webb School and Science College.

The publication of The Golden Arrow in 1917 enabled them to move to Lyth Hill, Bayston Hill, a place she loved, where they bought a plot of land and built Spring Cottage.

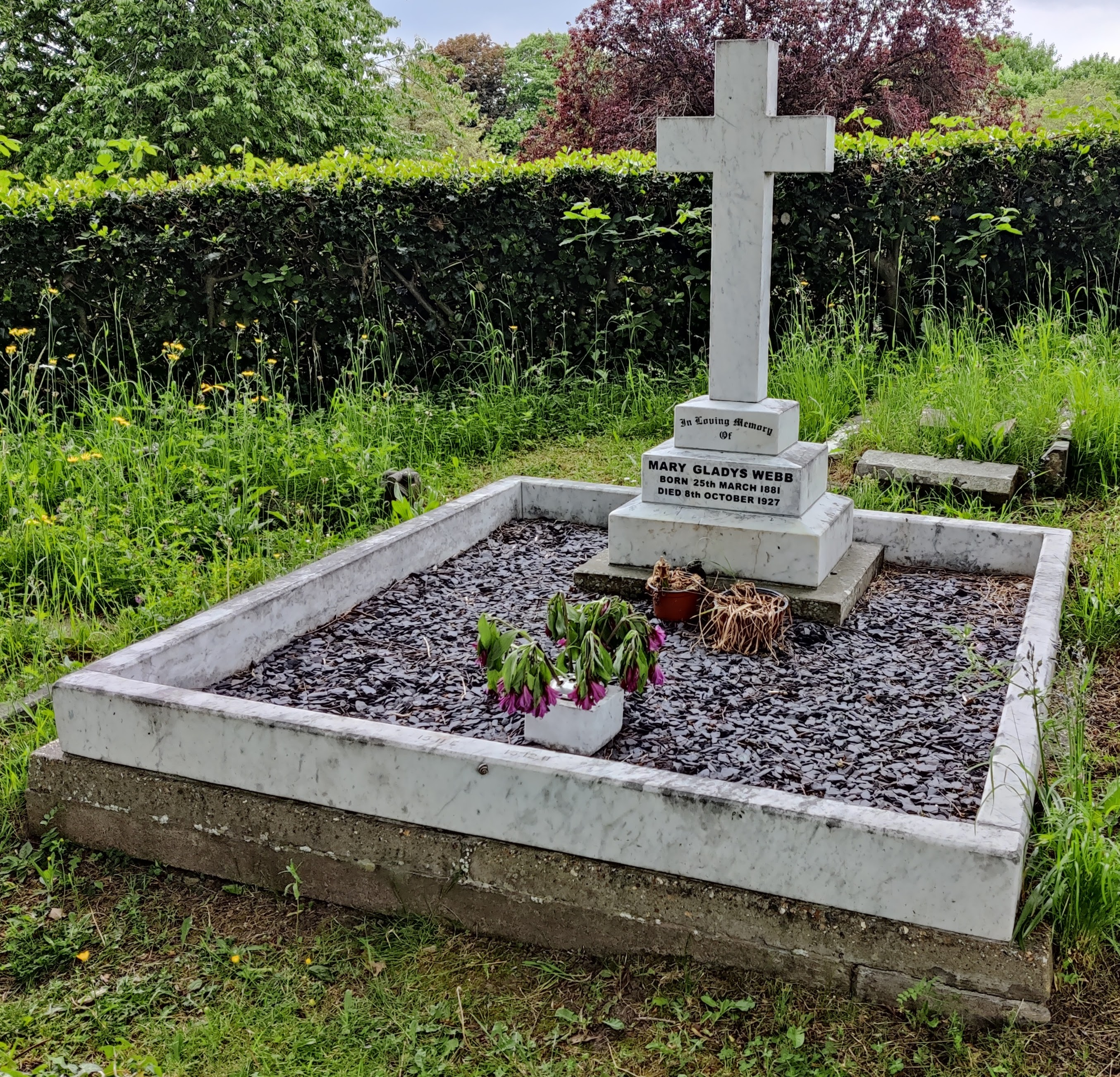
Mary Webb Grave, Longden Road cemetery, Shrewsbury

In 1921, they bought a second property at Hampstead Grove in London, in the hope that by being in the city, she could achieve greater literary recognition. This, however, did not happen, although she won the Prix Femina Vie Heureuse for Precious Bane in 1926. By 1927, she was suffering increasingly bad health, her marriage was failing, and she returned to Spring Cottage alone. She died at St Leonards-on-Sea, aged 46. She was buried in Shrewsbury, at the General Cemetery in Longden Road.

== Legacy ==
Her writing in general was reviewed as notable for poetic descriptions of nature. Another aspect throughout her work was a close and fatalistic view on human psychology.

After her death, Prime Minister Stanley Baldwin brought about her commercial success when, at a dinner of the Royal Literary Fund in 1928, he referred to her as a neglected genius. Consequently, her collected works were republished in a standard edition by Jonathan Cape, becoming best sellers in the 1930s and running into many editions.

Stella Gibbons's 1932 novel Cold Comfort Farm was a parody of Webb's work, as well as of other "loam and lovechild" writers like Sheila Kaye-Smith and Mary E. Mann and, further back, Thomas Hardy. In a 1966 Punch article, Gibbons observed:

The large agonised faces in Mary Webb's book annoyed me ... I did not believe people were any more despairing in Herefordshire [sic] than in Camden Town.

Literary critic John Sutherland refers to the genre as the "soil and gloom romance" and credits Webb as its pioneer.

The museum at the Tourist Information Centre in Much Wenlock includes much information on Mary Webb, including a display of photographs of the filming of her novel Gone to Earth in 1950.

Her cottage on Lyth Hill (not open to the public) can still be seen. In September 2013, plans were submitted for its demolition.

Three of Webb's novels have been reprinted by Virago Press.

The composer John C. Williams collaborated with poet Roger Garfitt on In All My Holy Mountain (2017), a celebration in jazz and poetry of her life and work.

== Bibliography ==
- The Golden Arrow (July 1916). London : Constable.
- Gone to Earth (September 1917). London : Constable.
- The Spring of Joy; a little book of healing (October 1917). London : J. M. Dent.
- The House in Dormer Forest (July 1920). London : Hutchinson.
- Seven for a Secret (October 1922). London : Hutchinson.
- Precious Bane (July 1924). London : Jonathan Cape.
- Poems and the Spring of Joy (Essays and Poems) (1928). London : Jonathan Cape.
- Armour Wherein He Trusted: A Novel and Some Stories (1929). London : Jonathan Cape.
- A Mary Webb Anthology edited by Henry B.L. Webb (1939). London : Jonathan Cape.
- Fifty-One Poems (1946). London : Jonathan Cape. With wood engravings by Joan Hassall
- The Essential Mary Webb edited by Martin Armstrong (1949). London : Jonathan Cape.
- Mary Webb: Collected Prose and Poems edited by Gladys Mary Coles (1977). Shrewsbury : Wildings.
- Selected Poems of Mary Webb edited by Gladys Mary Coles (1981). Wirral : Headland

=== Biographies ===
- The Shropshire of Mary Webb by W. Reid Chappell (1930). London : Cecil Palmer
- Mary Webb: Her Life and Works by Thomas Moult (1932). London : Jonathan Cape
- Shropshire Haunts of Mary Webb by W. Byford-Jones (1937). Shrewsbury : Wilding and Son
- Goodbye To Morning: A biographical study of Mary Webb by Dorothy H. P. Wrenn (1964). Shrewsbury : Wilding and Son
- The Flower of Light: A Biography of Mary Webb by Gladys Mary Coles (1978). London : Duckworth & Co Ltd); (1998). Wirral : Headland Publications
- Mary Webb: A Narrative Bibliography of Her Life and Work by Gordon Dickins (1981). – : –
- Daughters and Lovers: The Life and Writing of Mary Webb by Michèle Aina Barale (1986). Connecticut : Wesleyan University Press
- Mary Webb Country: An Introduction to Her Life and Work by Linda Davies (1990). Wirral : Palmers Press
- Best Day of My Life: Mary Meredith (Young Mary Webb) at Much Wenlock by Kenneth Milner (1999). – : Dormer
- Lullingford: Mary Webb's Much Wenlock by Kenneth Milner (2004). – : –

== Memorials ==
A monumental bust of Mary Webb, commissioned by the Mary Webb Society, was unveiled in the grounds of Shrewsbury Library on 9 July 2016.

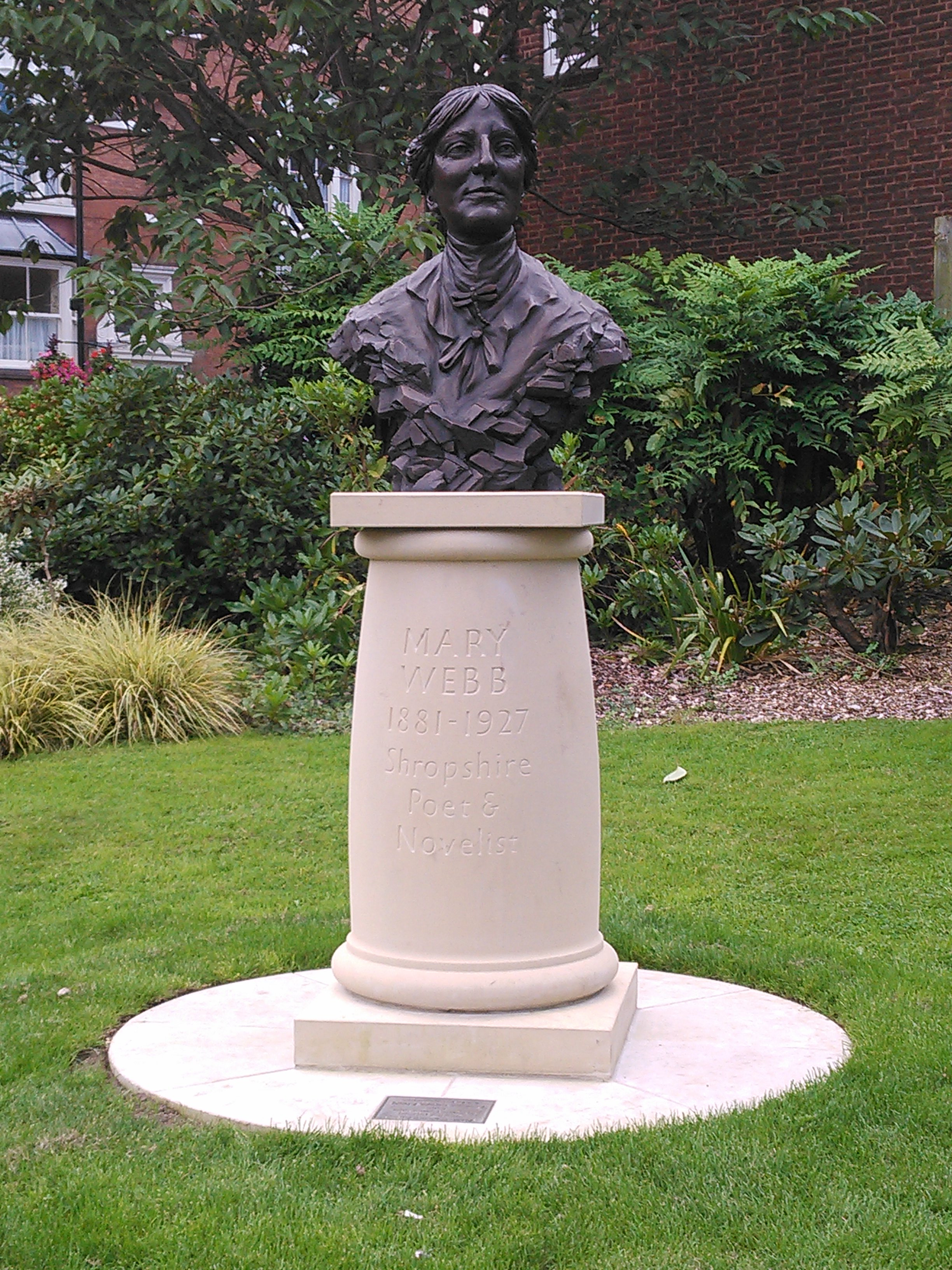

A blue plaque to commemorate her birth was unveiled by the Mary Webb Society at Leighton Lodge in March 2022.

In 1984, UK rose breeder David C. H. Austin named an apricot-colored rose cultivar after Mary Webb.

=== Mary Webb Society ===
The Mary Webb Society was established in Shropshire in 1972 to commemorate and promote the appreciation of Mary Webb. The Society organises events each year related to Webb’s life and literature. From 1989 until her death in 2024, the Society’s president was Gladys Mary Coles, poet, novelist and Webb’s principal biographer.
