= Gone to Earth (novel) =

1917 novel

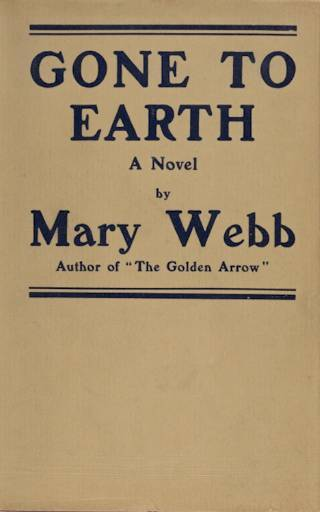
- First edition
- Author: Mary Webb
- Language: English
- Genre: Romantic drama
- Publisher: Constable
- Publication date: 1917
- Publication place: United Kingdom
- Media type: Print

Gone to Earth is a 1917 romance novel by the British writer Mary Webb. It was her second novel following her debut The Golden Arrow the previous year. It received positive reviews and Rebecca West described it as her book of the year. It is set in Shropshire around Long Mynd and Wenlock Edge. In 1935 it was one of the first batch of Penguin Books published.

== Adaptations ==
In 1950 the novel was adapted into the film Gone to Earth directed by Michael Powell and Emeric Pressburger and starring Jennifer Jones, David Farrar and Cyril Cusack. It was later re-edited, shortened and retitled for its American release, and fell into relative obscurity. In 1985, the full 110-minute restored version was released by the National Film Archive, to critical acclaim.

It was further adapted in a 2004 play by Helen Edmundson, which was produced by Shared Experience at the Lyric Hammersmith and on tour; Edmundson was subsequently nominated for a TMA Award.

== Bibliography ==
- Baldick, Chris. Literature of the 1920s: Writers Among the Ruins, Volume 3. Edinburgh University Press, 2015.
- Goble, Alan. The Complete Index to Literary Sources in Film. Walter de Gruyter, 1999.
- Radford, Andrew. The Lost Girls: Demeter-Persephone and the Literary Imagination, 1850-1930. BRILL, 2007.
- Stringer, Jenny & Sutherland, John. The Oxford Companion to Twentieth-century Literature in English. Oxford University Press, 1996.
- Sutherland, John. Lives of the Novelists: A History of Fiction in 294 Lives. Profile Books, 2011.
