= Stella Gibbons =

British writer (1902–1989)

- Born: 5 January 1902; London, England
- Died: 19 December 1989 (aged 87); London, England
- Occupation: Writer
- Writing career
- Period: 1930–1970

Stella Dorothea Gibbons (5 January 1902 – 19 December 1989) was an English author, journalist, and poet. She established her reputation with her first novel, Cold Comfort Farm (1932), which has been reprinted many times. Although she was active as a writer for half a century, none of her later 22 novels or other literary works—which included a sequel to Cold Comfort Farm—achieved the same critical or popular success. Much of her work was long out of print before a modest revival in the 21st century.

The daughter of a London doctor, Gibbons had a turbulent and often unhappy childhood. After an indifferent school career she trained as a journalist, and worked as a reporter and features writer, mainly for the Evening Standard and The Lady. Her first book, published in 1930, was a collection of poems which was well received, and through her life she considered herself primarily a poet rather than a novelist. After Cold Comfort Farm, a satire on the genre of rural-themed "loam and lovechild" novels popular in the late 1920s, most of Gibbons's novels were based within the middle-class suburban world with which she was familiar.

Gibbons became a Fellow of the Royal Society of Literature in 1950. Her style has been praised by critics for its charm, barbed humour and descriptive skill, and has led to comparison with Jane Austen. The impact of Cold Comfort Farm dominated her career, and she grew to resent her identification with the book to the exclusion of the rest of her output. Widely regarded as a one-work novelist, she and her works have not been accepted into the canon of English literature—partly, other writers have suggested, because of her detachment from the literary world and her tendency to mock it.

== Life ==
=== Family background and childhood ===
The Gibbons family originated from Ireland. Stella's grandfather, Charles Preston Gibbons, was a civil engineer who spent long periods in South Africa building bridges. He and his wife Alice had six children, the second of whom—the eldest of four sons—was born in 1869 and was known by his fourth Christian name of "Telford". The Gibbons household was a turbulent one, with tensions arising from Charles Gibbons's frequent adulteries. Telford Gibbons trained as a doctor, and qualified as a physician and surgeon at the London Hospital in 1897. On 29 September 1900 he married Maude Williams, the daughter of a stockbroker. The couple bought a house in Malden Crescent, Kentish Town, a working-class district of North London, where Telford established the medical practice in which he continued for the remainder of his life.

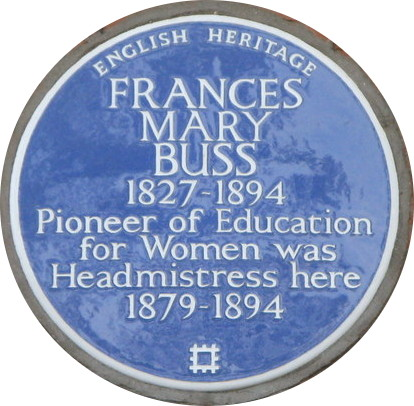
Blue plaque on the North London Collegiate in Camden Town, which Gibbons attended 1915–1921.

Stella, the couple's first child, was born on 5 January 1902; two brothers, Gerald and Lewis, followed in 1905 and 1909 respectively. The atmosphere in the Kentish Town house echoed that of the elder Gibbons's household, and was dominated by Telford's frequent bouts of ill-temper, drinking, womanising and occasional acts of violence. Stella later described her father as "a bad man, but a good doctor". (Note: Gibbons wrote these words in her autobiographical novel Enbury Heath (1935). Her biographer and nephew Reggie Oliver maintains that this is clearly a description of Telford Gibbons.) He was charitable to his poorer patients and imaginative in finding cures, but made life miserable for his family. Initially Stella was his favourite, but by the time she reached puberty he frequently mocked her looks and size. Fortunately, her mother was a calm and stabilising influence. Until Stella reached the age of 13 she was educated at home by a succession of governesses, who never stayed long. The family's bookshelves provided reading material, and she developed a talent for storytelling with which she amused her young brothers.

In 1915 Stella became a pupil at the North London Collegiate School, then situated in Camden Town. The school, founded in 1850 by Frances Buss, was among the first in England to offer girls an academic education, and by 1915 was widely recognised as a model girls' school. After the haphazard teaching methods of her governesses, Stella initially had difficulty in adjusting to the strict discipline of the school, and found many of its rules and practices oppressive. She shared this attitude with her contemporary Stevie Smith, the future Queen's Gold Medal for Poetry winner, who joined the school in 1917. Although a moderate performer in school subjects, Stella found outlets for her talents by writing stories for her fellow-pupils, becoming vice president of the Senior Dramatic Club, and featuring prominently in the school's Debating Society, of which she became the honorary secretary.

=== Student years ===
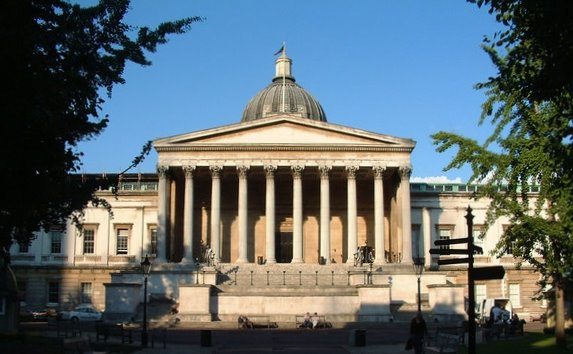
The UCL building in Gower Street, London

While at school, Gibbons formed an ambition to be a writer, and on leaving in 1921 began a two-year Diploma in Journalism at University College, London (UCL). The course had been established for ex-servicemen returning from the First World War, but attracted several women, among them the future novelist Elizabeth Bowen. As well as English Literature, the curriculum covered economics, politics, history, science and languages; practical skills such as shorthand and typing were not included.

After the stifling experience of school, Gibbons found university exhilarating and made numerous friendships, particularly with Ida Affleck Graves, an aspiring poet who, although on a different course, attended some of the same lectures. The two shared a love of literature and a taste for subversive humour. Graves lived until 1999, and recalled in an interview late in life that many of the jokes they shared found their way into Cold Comfort Farm, as did some of their common acquaintances. Soon after Gibbons began the course she contributed a poem, "The Marshes of My Soul", to the December 1921 issue of University College Magazine. This parody, in the newly fashionable vers libre style, was her first published literary work. During the next two years she contributed further poems and prose to the magazine, including "The Doer, a Story in the Russian Manner", which foreshadows her later novels in both theme and style. Gibbons completed her course in the summer of 1923, and was awarded her diploma.

=== Journalism and early writings ===
Gibbons's first job was with the British United Press (BUP) news agency, where she decoded overseas cables which she rewrote in presentable English. During slack periods she practised writing articles, stories and poems. She made her first trips abroad, travelling to France in 1924 and Switzerland in 1925. Swiss Alpine scenery inspired several poems, some of which were later published. In 1924 she met Walter Beck, a naturalised German employed by his family's cosmetics firm. The couple became engaged, and enjoyed regular weekends together, signing hotel registers as a married couple using false names.

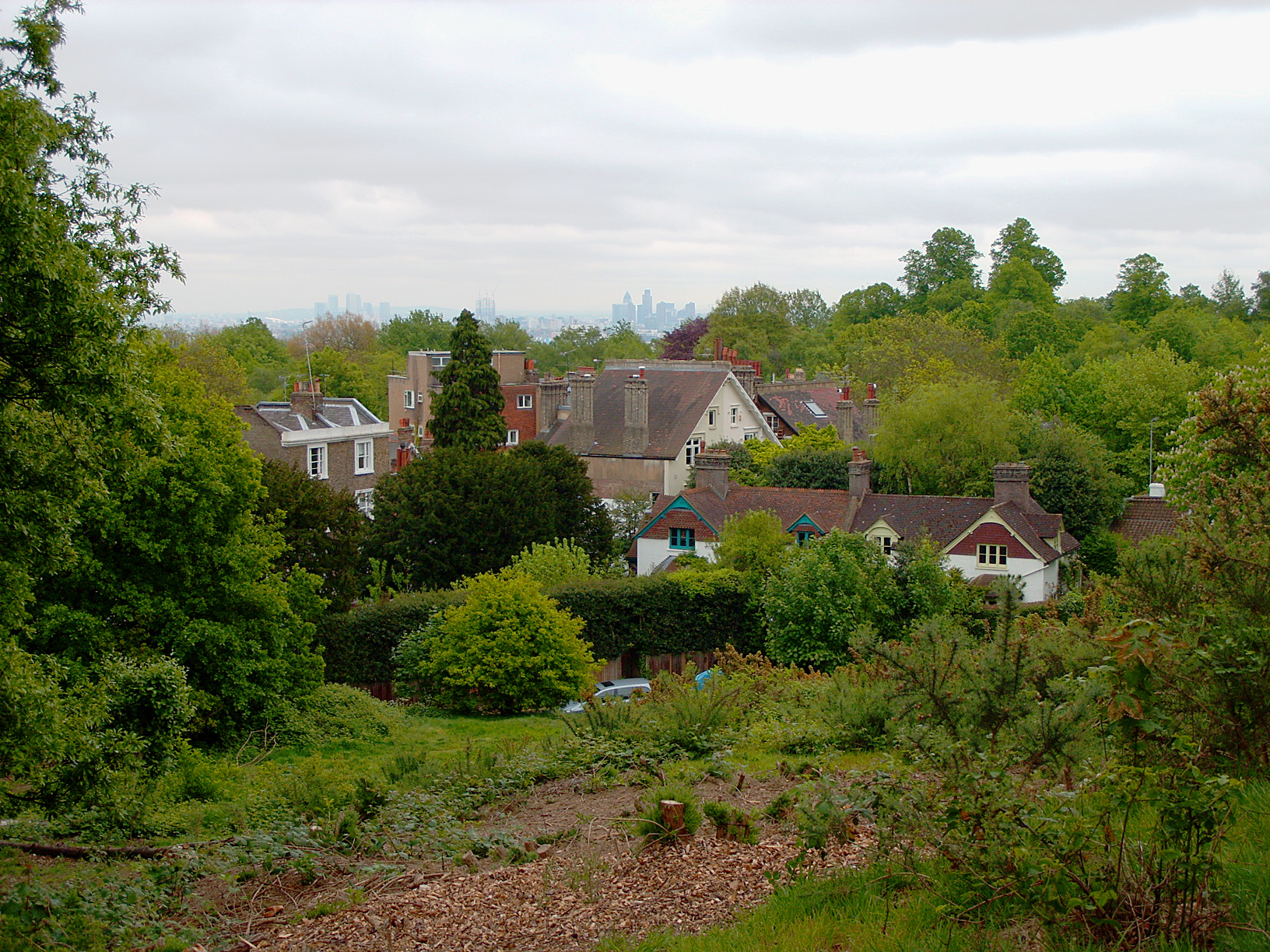
The Vale of Health on Hampstead Heath, where Gibbons lived with her brothers after their parents' deaths

In May 1926 Gibbons's mother, Maude, died suddenly at the age of 48. With little reason to remain with her father in the Kentish Town surgery, Gibbons took lodgings in Willow Road, near Hampstead Heath. Five months later, on 15 October, her father died from heart disease aggravated by heavy drinking. Gibbons was now the family's principal breadwinner; her youngest brother Lewis was still at school, while the elder, Gerald, was intermittently employed as an actor. The three set up home in a cottage on the Vale of Health, a small settlement in the middle of Hampstead Heath, with literary connections to Keats (whom Gibbons revered), Leigh Hunt and D. H. Lawrence. Later that year, as a result of an error involving the calculation and reporting of foreign exchange rates, Gibbons was sacked from the BUP, but quickly found a new position as secretary to the editor of the London Evening Standard. Within a short time she was promoted, and became a reporter and features writer at the then substantial salary of just under £500 a year, although she was not given a by-line until 1928.

During her Evening Standard years, Gibbons persevered with poetry, and in September 1927 her poem "The Giraffes" appeared in The Criterion, a literary magazine edited by T. S. Eliot. This work was read and admired by Virginia Woolf, who enquired if Gibbons would write poems for the Woolf publishing house, the Hogarth Press. In January 1928 J. C. Squire, a leading voice in the "Georgian" poetry movement, began to publish Gibbons's poems in his magazine, The London Mercury. Squire also persuaded Longmans to publish the first collection of Gibbons's verses, entitled The Mountain Beast, which appeared in 1930 to critical approval. By this time her by-line was appearing with increasing frequency in the Standard. As part of a series on "Unusual Women" she interviewed, among others, the former royal mistress Lillie Langtry. The paper also published several of Gibbons's short stories.

Despite this evident industry, Gibbons was dismissed from the Standard in August 1930. This was ostensibly an economy measure although Gibbons, in later life, suspected other reasons, particularly the increasing distraction from work that arose from her relationship with Walter Beck. The engagement had ended painfully in 1928, primarily because Gibbons was looking for a fully committed relationship whereas he wanted something more open. Oliver believes Gibbons never entirely got over Beck, even after 1929 when she met Allan Webb, her future husband. She was not unemployed for long; she quickly accepted a job offer as an editorial assistant at the women's magazine, The Lady. Here, according to The Observer writer Rachel Cooke, "she applied her versatility as a writer to every subject under the sun bar cookery, which was the province of a certain Mrs Peel." At the same time she began work on the novel that would become Cold Comfort Farm; her colleague and friend Elizabeth Coxhead recorded that Gibbons "neglected her duties disgracefully" to work on this project.

=== Cold Comfort Farm ===
In her time with The Lady, Gibbons established a reputation as a caustic book reviewer, and was particularly critical of the then fashionable "loam and lovechild" rural novels. Novelists such as Mary Webb and Sheila Kaye-Smith had achieved considerable popularity through their depictions of country life; Webb was a favourite of the British Prime Minister Stanley Baldwin. Gibbons had first become familiar with the genre when she provided summaries of Webb's The Golden Arrow for the Evening Standard's 1928 serialisation. She found the writing overblown and the plotting ridiculous, and decided that her own first novel would be a comic parody of the genre. By February 1932 she had completed the manuscript and delivered it to her publishers, Longmans.

"Every year, in the fulness o' summer, when the sukebind hangs heavy from the wains ... 'tes the same. And when the spring comes her hour is upon her again ... 'Tes the hand of Nature and we women cannot escape it."

— Cold Comfort Farm, chapter V. Judith Starkadder explains the mysterious properties of "sukebind". (Note: The word "sukebind" was invented by Gibbons. The Shorter Oxford English Dictionary defines it as "An imaginary plant associated with superstition, fertility and intense rustic passion".)

Gibbons's chosen title for her novel had been "Curse God Farm", before her friend Elizabeth Coxhead, who had connections in the Hinckley district of Leicestershire, suggested "Cold Comfort" as an alternative, using the name of a farm in the Hinckley area. Gibbons was delighted with the suggestion, and the work was published as Cold Comfort Farm in September 1932. The plot concerns the efforts of "a rational, bossy London heroine" to bring order and serenity to her rustic relations, the Starkadders, on their run-down Sussex farm. According to the Feminist Companion to Literature in English, Gibbons's parody "[demolishes] ... the stock-in-trade of earthy regionalists such as Thomas Hardy, Mary Webb, Sheila Kaye-Smith and D. H. Lawrence". The literary scholar Faye Hammill describes the work as "an extremely sophisticated and intricate parody whose meaning is produced through its relationship with the literary culture of its day and with the work of such canonical authors as D. H. Lawrence, Thomas Hardy, and Emily Brontë". In her history of the 1930s, Juliet Gardiner ascribes a socio-economic dimension to the book: "a picture of rural gloom caused by government lassitude and urban indifference".

The work was an immediate critical and popular success. The satire was heightened by Gibbons's mockery of purple prose, whereby she marked the most florid and overwritten passages of the book with asterisks, "for the reader's delectation and mirth". One critic found it hard to accept that so well-developed a parody was the work of a scarcely known woman writer, and speculated that "Stella Gibbons" was a pen-name for Evelyn Waugh. (Note: Like Cold Comfort Farm, Waugh's 1930 novel Vile Bodies is prefaced by a note defining its setting as "the near future", and both novels portray a fascination with new or projected technology.) Gibbons suddenly found herself in demand in literary circles and from fellow writers, raised to a celebrity status that she found distasteful. She acquired an agent, who advised her that she could confidently expect a regular and comfortable income as a novelist. This assurance prompted her, at the end of 1932, to resign her position with The Lady and to embark on a full-time writing career.

In March 1931 Gibbons had become engaged to Allan Webb, a budding actor and opera singer five years her junior. He was the son of a cricketing parson, (Note: Who's Who of Cricketers (1984) records that the Revd Charles Johnston Bourne Webb (1874–1963) played two first-class matches for Middlesex in 1902, with little success, and that he also played for Dorset.) and the grandson of Allan Becher Webb, a former Bishop of Bloemfontein who served as Dean of Salisbury Cathedral. On 1 April 1933 the couple were married at St Matthew's, Bayswater. Later in 1933 she learned that Cold Comfort Farm had been awarded the Prix Étranger, the foreign novel category of the prestigious French literary prize, the Prix Femina. It had won against works by two more experienced writers, Bowen and Rosamond Lehmann. This outcome irritated Virginia Woolf, herself a former Prix Étranger winner, who wrote to Bowen: "I was enraged to see they gave the £40 (the cash value of the prize) to Gibbons; still, now you and Rosamond can join in blaming her". Cooke observes that of all the Prix Étranger winners from the inter-war years, only Cold Comfort Farm and Woolf's To the Lighthouse are remembered today, and that only the former has bequeathed a phrase that has passed into common usage: "something nasty in the woodshed".

=== Established author ===
==== 1930s ====
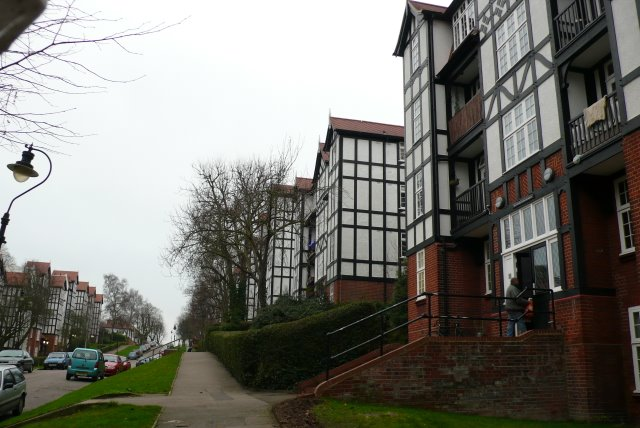
Mock Tudor houses on the Holly Lodge Estate, Highgate, where Gibbons lived from 1936 (2008 photograph)

During the remainder of the 1930s Gibbons produced five more novels, as well as two poetry collections, a children's book, and a number of short stories. From November 1936 the family home was in Oakshott Avenue, on the Holly Lodge Estate off Highgate West Hill, where Gibbons regularly worked in the mornings from ten until lunchtime. Her novels were generally well received by critics and the public, though none earned the accolades or attention that had been given to Cold Comfort Farm; readers of The Times were specifically warned not to expect Gibbons's second novel, Bassett (1934), to be a repetition of the earlier masterpiece. Enbury Heath (1935) is a relatively faithful account of her childhood and early adult life with, according to Oliver, "only the thinnest veil of fictional gauze cover[ing] raw experience". Miss Linsey and Pa (1936) was thought by Nicola Beauman, in her analysis of women writers from 1914 to 1939, to parody Radclyffe Hall's 1928 lesbian novel The Well of Loneliness. Gibbons's final prewar novels were Nightingale Wood (1935)—"Cinderella brought right up to date"—and My American (1939), which Oliver considers her most escapist novel, "a variant of Hans Christian Andersen's The Snow Queen."

Gibbons always considered herself a serious poet rather than a comic writer. She published two collections of poetry in the 1930s, the latter of which, The Lowland Verses (1938) contains "The Marriage of the Machine", an early lament on the effects of industrial pollution: "What oil, what poison lulls/Your wings and webs, my cormorants and gulls?" Gibbons's single children's book was the fairy tale collection The Untidy Gnome, published in 1935 and dedicated to her only child Laura, who was born that year.

==== War years, 1939–1945 ====
The advent of war in September 1939 did not diminish Gibbons's creative energy. In November she began a series of articles, "A Woman's Diary of the War", for St Martin's Review, the journal of the London church of St Martin-in-the-Fields. The series ran until November 1943, and includes many of Gibbons's private reflections on the conflict. In October 1941 she wrote: "[T]he war has done me good ... I get a dour satisfaction out of managing the rations, salvaging, fire watching, and feeling that I am trying to work for a better world". In July 1940 her husband Allan Webb enlisted in the Middlesex Regiment, and the following year was commissioned into the King's Royal Rifle Corps. He later served overseas, mostly in Cairo.

The title story in Gibbons's 1940 collection, Christmas at Cold Comfort Farm, failed to equal the impact of the original. When the collection was reissued many years later it was described as "oddly comforting and amusing ... and possibly a truer depiction of the times than we might think". Gibbons published three novels during the war: The Rich House (1941), Ticky (1942) and The Bachelor (1944). Ticky, a satire on mid-nineteenth century army life, was Gibbons's favourite of all her novels, although she acknowledged that hardly anyone liked it. It failed commercially, despite a favourable review in The Times Literary Supplement. Oliver surmises that "the middle of the Second World War was perhaps the wrong time to satirise ... the ridiculous and dangerous rituals that surround the male aggressive instinct". The Bachelor won critical praise for its revealing account of life in war-torn Britain—as did several of Gibbons's postwar novels.

=== Postwar years ===
Gibbons's first postwar novel was Westwood (1946). The book incorporates a comic depiction of the novelist Charles Morgan, whose novel The Fountain Gibbons had reviewed before the war and found "offensive as well as wearisome". In Westwood, Morgan appears in the guise of the playwright "Gerard Challis", a pompous, humourless bore. Oliver considers this characterisation to be one of Gibbons's "most enjoyable and vicious" satirical portraits. (Note: Although other critics shared Gibbons's disdain for Morgan, his reputation has been defended by John Bayley, who in a 1985 review of a reprint of Morgan's The Fountain, described the book as "written as beautifully as it is possible for a book to be".) In her introduction to the book's 2011 reprint, Lynne Truss describes it as "a rich, mature novel, romantic and wistful, full of rounded characters and terrific dialogue" that deserved more commercial success than it received. The public's expectations were still prejudiced by Cold Comfort Farm, which by 1949 had sold 28,000 copies in hardback and 315,000 in paperback. Anticipating that a sequel would be popular, that year Gibbons produced Conference at Cold Comfort Farm, her shortest novel, in which the farm has become a conference centre and tourist attraction. There is much mockery of contemporary and indeed future artistic and intellectual trends, before the male Starkadders return from overseas, wreck the centre and restore the farm to its original primitive state. The book was moderately successful but, Oliver remarks, does not compare with the original.

"The shapely story is guided to an ending which satisfies those readers (if such there be) who care whether Elinor is happy or not but which, I dare to say, is very unsatisfactory to those who love Marianne ... If I have not spoken of Colonel Brandon it is because I do not care to."

— From Gibbons's "Introduction" to a 1957 reissue of Jane Austen's Sense and Sensibility.

In 1950 Gibbons published her Collected Poems, and in the same year was made a Fellow of the Royal Society of Literature. Throughout the 1950s she continued, at roughly two-year intervals, to produce politely received novels, none of which created any particular stir. Among these was Fort of the Bear (1953), in which she departed from her familiar London milieu by setting the story largely in the wilder regions of Canada. This was the last of her books handled by Longmans; thereafter her work was published by Hodder and Stoughton. A journey to Austria and Venice in 1953 provided material for her novel The Shadow of a Sorcerer (1955). From 1954, having accepted an invitation from Malcolm Muggeridge, the editor of Punch, Gibbons provided frequent contributions to the magazine for the following 15 years. Among these was a science fiction story, "Jane in Space", written in the style of Jane Austen. Gibbons, who wrote the introduction to the 1957 Heritage edition of Sense and Sensibility, was a long-time admirer of Austen, and had described her in a Lady article as "one of the most exquisite" of woman artists.

After the war, Allan Webb resumed his stage career with the role of Count Almaviva in the 1946 Sadler's Wells production of The Marriage of Figaro. In 1947 he appeared in the original run of the Vivian Ellis musical Bless the Bride, and made several further stage appearances in the following two years. During this time he had a brief affair with the actress Sydney Malcolm, for which Gibbons quickly forgave him. He left the theatre in 1949 to become a director of a book club specialising in special editions, and later bought a bookshop in the Archway district of London. His health failed in the late 1950s and in 1958 he was diagnosed with cancer of the liver. He died in July 1959 at Oakshott Avenue. (Note: In 1989, in its report of Gibbons's death, The New York Times mistakenly referred to Webb as her second husband.)

=== Late career ===
After Webb's death, Gibbons remained at Oakshott Avenue and continued to write novels. From 1961 she rented a summer house at Trevone in Cornwall, which became the setting for her 1962 novel The Weather at Tregulla. She returned to literary criticism after many years, when in 1965 she contributed an essay to Light on C.S. Lewis, a review of that writer's work edited by Jocelyn Gibb. In 1966 she wrote an essay for Punch, "Genesis of a Novel", in which she mused on the detrimental effect of Cold Comfort Farm on her long-term career. She likened the book to "some unignorable old uncle, to whom you have to be grateful because he makes you a handsome allowance, but is often an embarrassment and a bore". Gibbons made her last overseas trip in 1966, to Grenoble in France where she visited her old friend Elizabeth Coxhead. This visit provided material for her 1968 novel The Snow Woman in which Gibbons overcame her habitual distaste for emotional excess by opening the book with a melodramatic birth on a sofa. The Woods in Winter (1970) was her last published novel; she decided at that point that she was no longer prepared to subject her work to editorial control. In the 1980s she wrote two more novels for private circulation among friends, The Yellow Houses and An Alpha. These books – An Alpha retitled Pure Juliet – were published by Vintage Classics in 2016, after the manuscripts were released by Gibbons's family.

=== Final years ===
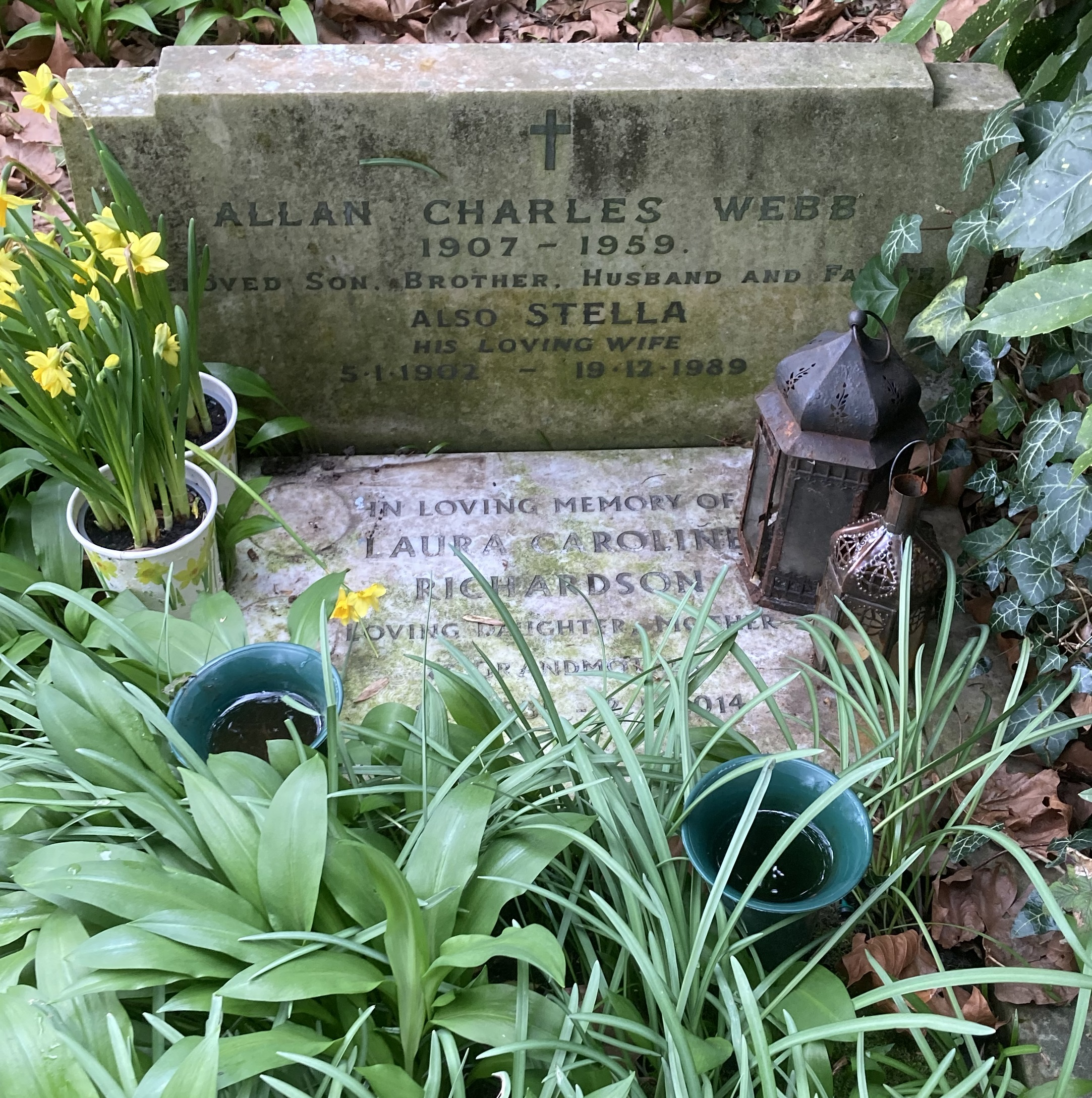
Grave of Stella Gibbons in Highgate Cemetery (west side)

The last two decades of Gibbons's life were uneventful and lived almost entirely beyond the public eye. She kept her health and looks until almost the end of her life—in a biographical sketch, Jill Neville recorded that "her beauty endured, as did her upright carriage, typical of Edwardian ladies who were forced as girls to walk around with a book balanced on their heads." As well as her unpublished novels she wrote occasional short stories, two of which were rejected by the BBC, and contributed three new poems to Richard Adams's 1986 anthology Occasional Poets, a work which included verses from part-time poets such as Iris Murdoch, William Golding, Alan Ayckbourn and Quentin Crisp. These were Gibbons's last published works. One of Gibbons's poems in the anthology was "Writ in Water", inspired by her love for the poetry of Keats. In 2013 the manuscript of this poem was presented to the Keats-Shelley Memorial House museum in Rome.

Gibbons maintained a wide circle of friends, who in her later years included Adams, the entertainer Barry Humphries and the novelist John Braine. From the mid-1970s she established a pattern of monthly literary tea parties in Oakshott Avenue at which, according to Neville, "she was known to expel guests if they were shrill, dramatic, or wrote tragic novels." As her own productivity dwindled and finally ceased altogether, she kept a commonplace book in which she was recording her thoughts and opinions on literature as late as 1988.

From the mid-1980s Gibbons experienced recurrent health problems, not helped when she resumed smoking. In her last months she was looked after at home by her grandson and his girlfriend. She died there on 19 December 1989, after collapsing the previous day, and was buried in Highgate Cemetery, alongside her husband. At her funeral, her nephew and future biographer Reggie Oliver read two of her poems, the latter of which, "Fairford Church", concludes with the words: "Little is sure. Life is hard./We love, we suffer and die./But the beauty of the earth is real/And the Spirit is nigh."

== Writing ==
=== Style ===
Gibbons's writing has been praised by critics for its perspicacity, sense of fun, charm, wit and descriptive skill—the last a product of her journalistic training—which she used to convey both atmosphere and character. Although Beauman refers to "malicious wit", Truss sees no cruelty in the often barbed humour, which reflected Gibbons's detestation of pomposity and pretence. Truss has described Gibbons as "the Jane Austen of the 20th century", (Note: Gibbons as the 20th century's Austen is an opinion not shared by the writer Alexander McCall Smith, who suggests that this accolade belongs to Barbara Pym.) a parallel which the novelist Malcolm Bradbury thought apt; Flora Poste in Cold Comfort Farm, with her "higher common sense", is "a Jane-ite heroine transformed into a clear-eyed modern woman". Bradbury also observed that many of Gibbons's novels end in Austen-like nuptials.

Truss highlights the importance that Gibbons places on detachment as a necessary adjunct to effective writing: "Like many a good doctor, she seems to have considered sympathy a peculiar and redundant emotion, and a terrible waste of time." This matter-of-fact quality in her prose might, according to Gibbons's Guardian obituarist Richard Boston, be a reaction against the turbulent and sometimes violent emotions that she witnessed within her own family who, she said, "were all madly highly-sexed, like the Starkadders". It is, observed Neville, an irony that the overheated melodrama that Gibbons most disliked was at the heart of her one great success; Gibbons's writings on everyday life brought her restrained approval, but no noticeable literary recognition. Nevertheless, her straightforward, style, unadorned except in parody, is admired by Rachel Cooke, who praises her as "a sworn enemy of the flatulent, the pompous and the excessively sentimental." While short of sentimentality, Gibbons's writing, in prose or verse, did not lack sensitivity. She had what one analyst described as "a rare ability to enter into the feelings of the uncommunicative and to bring to life the emotions of the unremarkable".

Some of Gibbons's poetry expressed her love of nature and a prophetic awareness for environmental issues such as sea pollution, decades before such concerns became fashionable. In a critical summary of Gibbons's poems, Loralee MacPike has described them as "slight lyrics ... [which] tend toward classic, even archaic, diction, and only occasionally ... show flashes of the novels' wit". Such lines as "my thoughts, like purple parrots / Brood / In the sick light" come dangerously close indeed to the overblown rhetoric she satirized in Cold Comfort Farm: "How like yaks were your drowsy thoughts".

=== Reception and reputation ===
The immediate and enduring success of Cold Comfort Farm dominated the rest of Gibbons's career. Neville thought that after so singular a success at the start of her career, the rest was something of an anticlimax, despite her considerable industry and undoubted skills. The 1985 edition of The Oxford Companion to English Literature defines Gibbons solely in terms of Cold Comfort Farm; it mentions none of her other works—while providing her bêtes noires Morgan and Mary Webb with full entries. To Gibbons, Cold Comfort Farm became "That Book" or "You-Know-What", its title never mentioned. Despite her growing irritation and expressed distaste for it, the book continued to be lauded by successive generations of critics, Boston described it as "one of those rare books of comic genius that imprints itself on the brain and can never afterwards be eradicated". A more negative view of the book has been expressed by the literary critic Mary Beard, who considers it "a rather controlling victory of modern order, cleanliness, contraception and medicine over these messy, different, rural types ... I found myself screaming for the rights of these poor country folk NOT to fall into the hands of people like Flora".

"For Gibbons, the suburb offered an ideal vantage point for exploring both urban modernity and countryside traditionalism, and for observing both literary modernism and the vestigial Romanticism of popular rural fiction."

— Faye Hammill: "Stella Gibbons: Ex-centricity and the Suburb"

Although Boston suggested that Gibbons's rating in the academic English Literature world ought to be high, her literary status is indeterminate. She did not promote herself, and was indifferent to the attractions of public life: "I'm not shy", she told Oliver, "I'm just unsociable". Truss records that Gibbons had "overtly rejected the literary world ... she didn't move in literary circles, or even visit literary squares, or love in literary triangles". Truss posits further reasons why Gibbons did not become a literary canon. Because she was a woman who wrote amusingly, she was classified as "middlebrow"; furthermore, she was published by Longmans, a non-literary publisher. Her lampooning of the literary establishment in the spoof dedication of Cold Comfort Farm to one "Anthony Pookworthy" did not amuse that establishment, who were further offended by the book's mockery of the writing of such canonical figures as Lawrence and Hardy—hence Virginia Woolf's reaction to the Prix Étranger award. Her belief in what she called "the gentle powers (Pity, Affection, Time, Beauty, Laughter)" also flew in the face of a disillusioned modernism.

The literary critic John Carey suggests that the abandonment by intellectuals of "the clerks and the suburbs" as subjects of literary interest provided an opening for writers prepared to exploit this underexplored area. He considers John Betjeman and Stevie Smith as two writers who successfully achieved this. Hammill believes that Gibbons should be named alongside these two, since in her writings she rejects the stereotypical view of suburbia as unexciting, conventional and limited. Instead, says Hammill, "Gibbons's fictional suburbs are socially and architecturally diverse, and her characters—who range from experimental writers to shopkeepers—read and interpret suburban styles and values in varying and incompatible ways". Hammill adds that Gibbons's strong identification with her own suburban home, in which she lived for 53 years, may have influenced her preference to stay outside the mainstream of metropolitan literary life, and from time to time mock it.

After many years in which almost all of Gibbons's output has been out of print, in 2011 the publishers Vintage Classics reissued paperback versions of Westwood, Starlight, and Conference at Cold Comfort Farm. They also announced plans to publish 11 of the other novels, on a print-on-demand basis.

=== List of works ===
Publisher information relates to first publication only. Many of the books have been reissued, usually by different publishers.

==== Novels ====
- Cold Comfort Farm. London: Longmans. 1932. OCLC 488370934.
- Bassett. London: Longmans. 1934. OCLC 1268745.
- Enbury Heath. London: Longmans. 1935. OCLC 771331617.
- Miss Linsey and Pa. London: Longmans. 1936. OCLC 771331622.
- Nightingale Wood. London: Longmans. 1938. OCLC 855282998.
- My American. London: Longmans. 1939. OCLC 3352997.
- The Rich House. London: Longmans. 1941. OCLC 4598606.
- Ticky. London: Longmans. 1943. OCLC 3349161.
- The Bachelor. London: Longmans. 1944. OCLC 3656831.
- Westwood, or The Gentle Powers. London: Longmans. 1946. OCLC 560579821.
- The Matchmaker. London: Longmans. 1949. OCLC 752953786.
- Conference at Cold Comfort Farm. London: Longmans 1949. OCLC 2550483.
- The Swiss Summer. London: Longmans. 1951. OCLC 3347559.
- Fort of the Bear. London: Longmans. 1953. OCLC 1268712.
- The Shadow of a Sorcerer. London: Hodder and Stoughton. 1955. OCLC 3298907.
- Here Be Dragons. London: Hodder and Stoughton. 1956. OCLC 3356228.
- White Sand and Grey Sand. London: Hodder and Stoughton. 1958. OCLC 4590193.
- A Pink Front Door. London: Hodder and Stoughton. 1959. OCLC 5755768.
- The Weather at Tregulla. London: Hodder and Stoughton. 1962. OCLC 3372249.
- The Wolves Were in the Sledge. London: Hodder and Stoughton. 1964. OCLC 5755731.
- The Charmers. London: Hodder and Stoughton. 1965. OCLC 560578870.
- Starlight. London: Hodder and Stoughton. 1967. OCLC 560579737.
- The Snow Woman. London: Hodder and Stoughton. 1968. ISBN 0-340-04264-8.
- The Woods in Winter. London: Hodder and Stoughton. 1970. ISBN 0-340-10570-4.
- Pure Juliet (formerly An Alpha ). London: Vintage Classics. 2016. ISBN 978-1-78487-027-0.
- The Yellow Houses. London: Vintage Classics. 2016. ISBN 978-1-78487-028-7.

==== Short stories ====
- Roaring Tower and other stories. London: Longmans. 1937. OCLC 6705456.
- Christmas at Cold Comfort Farm and other stories. London: Longmans. 1940. OCLC 771331616.
- Beside the Pearly Water. London: Peter Nevill. 1954. OCLC 6922440.

==== Children's books ====
- The Untidy Gnome. London: Longmans. 1935. OCLC 560579789.

==== Poetry ====
- The Mountain Beast. London: Longmans. 1930.
- The Priestess and other poems. London: Longmans. 1934. OCLC 7123475.
- The Lowland Venus. London: Longmans. 1938. OCLC 10421672.
- Collected Poems. London: Longmans. 1950. OCLC 3372203.

== Notes and references ==
=== Sources ===
- Bailey, Philip; Thorn, Philip; Wynne-Thomas, Peter (1984). Who's Who of Cricketers: a complete who's who of all cricketers who have played first-class cricket in England. London: Guild Publishing. ISBN 0-600-34692-7.
- Beauman, Nicola (1995). A Very Great Profession. London: Virago Press. ISBN 0-86068-309-5.
- Blain, Virginia; Clements, Patricia; Grundy, Isobel (1990). The Feminist Companion to English Literature. London: Batsford. ISBN 0-7134-5848-8.
- Carey, John (1992). The Intellectuals and the Masses: Pride and Prejudice Among the Literary Intelligentsia, 1880–1930. London: Faber and Faber. ISBN 0-571-16926-0.
- Cockburn, J. S.; King, H. P. F.; McDonnell, K. G. T. (1969). Victoria History of the Counties of England: A history of the county of Middlesex. Vol. 1. Oxford: Oxford University Press. ISBN 0-19-722713-9.
- Drabble, Margaret, ed. (1985). The Oxford Companion to English Literature. Oxford: Oxford University Press. ISBN 0-19-866130-4.
- Gardiner, Juliet (2011). The Thirties: An Intimate History. London: Harper Press. ISBN 978-0-00-731453-9.
- Gibbons, Stella (2006). Cold Comfort Farm. London: Penguin Books. ISBN 978-0-14-144159-7.
- Hammill, Faye (2007). Women, Celebrity, and Literary Culture between the Wars. Austin, TX: University of Texas Press. ISBN 978-0-292-71644-5.
- Hammill, Faye (2009). "Stella Gibbons, Ex-Centricity and the Suburb". In Bluemel, Kristin (ed.). Intermodernism: Literary Culture in Mid-twentieth-century Britain. Edinburgh: Edinburgh University Press. pp. 75–90. ISBN 978-0-7486-3509-2.
- Oliver, Reggie (1998). Out of the Woodshed: The Life of Stella Gibbons. London: Bloomsbury Publications. ISBN 0-7475-3995-2.
- Schlueter, June; Schlueter, Paul (1999). An Encyclopedia of British Women Writers. New Brunswick NJ: Rutgers University Press. ISBN 978-0-8135-2543-3.
- Truss, Lynne (2006). Introduction. Cold Comfort Farm. By Gibbons, Stella. London: Penguin Books. ISBN 978-0-14-144159-7.
- Truss, Lynne (2011). Introduction. Westwood, or, The Gentle Powers. By Gibbons, Stella. London: Vintage Books. ISBN 978-0-09-952872-2.
