= Gone to Earth (film) =

1950 British film by Michael Powell, Emeric Pressburger

- theatrical release poster
- Directed by: Michael Powell; Emeric Pressburger
- Written by: Michael Powell; Emeric Pressburger
- Based on: Gone to Earth by Mary Webb
- Produced by: Michael Powell; Emeric Pressburger
- Starring: Jennifer Jones; David Farrar; Cyril Cusack
- Cinematography: Christopher Challis
- Edited by: Reginald Mills
- Music by: Brian Easdale
- Color process: Technicolor
- Production companies: The Archers and London Films
- Distributed by: British Lion Films (UK)
- Release date: 6 November 1950
- Running time: 110 minutes
- Country: United Kingdom
- Language: English
- Budget: £285,000
- Box office: £110,000 (UK)

Gone to Earth is a 1950 British Technicolor drama film created by the director-writer team of Michael Powell and Emeric Pressburger. It stars Jennifer Jones, David Farrar, Cyril Cusack and Esmond Knight. The film was significantly changed for the American market by David O. Selznick and retitled The Wild Heart in 1952.

Gone to Earth is based on the 1917 novel of the same name by author Mary Webb. The novel was largely ignored when it first appeared, but it became better known in the 1930s during the neo-romantic revival.

== Plot ==
Hazel Woodus is a child of nature in the Shropshire countryside in 1897. She loves and understands all of the wild animals more than she does the people around her. Whenever she has problems, she consults the book of spells and charms left to her by her gypsy mother.

Local squire Jack Reddin sees Hazel and wants her, but she has already promised herself to the Baptist minister Edward Marston. A struggle for her body and soul ensues.

== Cast ==
- Jennifer Jones as Hazel Woodus
- David Farrar as John "Jack" Reddin
- Cyril Cusack as Edward Marston
- Sybil Thorndike as Mrs. Marston
- Edward Chapman as Mr. James
- Esmond Knight as Abel Woodus
- Hugh Griffith as Andrew Vessons
- George Cole as Cousin Albert

== Production ==
Filming on Gone to Earth, which was shot in Technicolor, began on 1 August 1949. Studio filming took place at Shepperton Studios in Shepperton, Surrey, while most of the film was shot on location at many sites around Much Wenlock in Shropshire. Many locals were recruited as extras, such as the choir from a local Methodist church that appears in the film.

The film was coproduced with American producer David O. Selznick, who had a penchant for dictating long and rambling notes to his directors while under the influence of amphetamines and flooded the production with memos, most of which were ignored.

== Subsequent history ==
=== The Wild Heart ===
The Wild Heart
- 1952 poster
- Directed by: Rouben Mamoulian (add'l scenes, uncredited)
- Written by: Rouben Mamoulian (add'l scenes, uncredited)
- Produced by: David O. Selznick (uncredited)
- Production companies: The Archers and Vanguard Films
- Distributed by: RKO Radio Pictures
- Release date: July 1952
- Running time: 82 minutes

Although he had been involved throughout the filming, Selznick disliked the finished film, and sued The Archers, Powell and Pressburger's production company, in order to change it. He lost the court case but discovered that he had the right to change the film for its American release.

Selznick had the film reedited and some extra scenes shot in Hollywood under director Rouben Mamoulian to create the version known as The Wild Heart (1952). Selznick's changes were mostly additions to the film: a prologue, explanatory scenes (often literally, with labels or inscriptions on items) and more closeups of his wife, Jennifer Jones. The most infamous of the alterations are the scenes at the end when Jones is supposedly carrying a tame fox—in the additional scenes, the fox is obviously a stuffed toy.

Selznick also deleted several scenes that he felt had lacked dramatic impact, some of which were major plot points. In his autobiographies, Powell claimed that Selznick only left about 35 minutes of the original film and that everything else in the American version was shot by Mamoulian.

=== Restoration ===
The original version of Gone to Earth was fully restored by the British Film Institute's National Archive in 1985. A New Statesman review called the restored film "one of the great British regional films" and, according to Powell's cinematographer Christopher Challis, "one of the most beautiful films ever to be shot of the English countryside."

Both versions of the film are now available in the U.S. on Blu-ray disc from Kino Lorber Studio Classics (under license from The Walt Disney Company and current copyright holder ABC).

== In popular culture ==
The film is extensively referenced in Jonathan Coe's novel The Rain Before It Falls (2007), in which two of the characters are identified as extras who appear in the foreground in one of the film's early scenes (around 8:25).
