= Stanton upon Hine Heath =

Village in Shropshire, England

Coordinates: 52.811°N 2.640°W

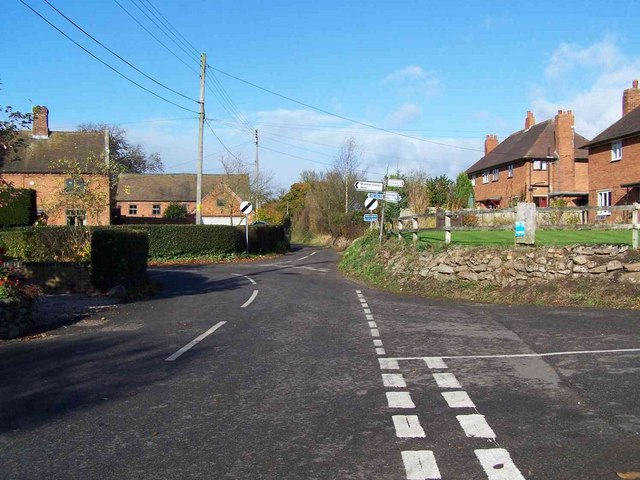
- Stanton upon Hine Heath

- Location within Shropshire
- Population: 576 (2011)
- OS grid reference: SJ568240
- Civil parish: Stanton upon Hine Heath
- Unitary authority: Shropshire
- Ceremonial county: Shropshire
- Region: West Midlands
- Country: England
- Sovereign state: United Kingdom
- Post town: Shrewsbury
- Postcode district: SY4
- Dialling code: 01939
- Police: West Mercia
- Fire: Shropshire
- Ambulance: West Midlands
- UK Parliament: North Shropshire

Stanton upon Hine Heath is a village and parish in Shropshire, England. The River Roden flows through the village.

Author Mary Webb (1881–1927) lived with her parents in Stanton from 1896 to 1902, at house then called The Woodlands, later called Harcourt Manor. Another author, Barbara Comyns Carr (1907–1992), died in the village and is buried in the graveyard of the village church, St. Andrew's. Nearby is the village of Moreton Corbet.

Running through the parish is the A53, between Shawbury and Hodnet.

== History ==
=== The Corbets ===
On 5 August 1100, a grant of 'Hortuna' was made by the Corbet family of neighbouring Moreton Corbet Castle to William 'Macro' and his heirs, requiring them to provide military protection for the parish of Stanton Upon Hine Heath for a duration of close to 35 years.

The land was sold in the 13th century by Thomas Corbet to John son of John Extraneo and the commune of Shrewsbury after which the land was leased or granted to various parties in the township.

== RAF Shawbury ==
Approximately one mile to the South West of Stanton upon Hine Heath is RAF Shawbury, which dates back to 1917. Between the First and Second World War, the area was transformed to agricultural land; however, in 1938 before outbreak of the Second World War, it was converted back to an airfield for military reasons. RAF Shawbury was named Number 11 (Pilot) Advanced Flying Unit, responsible for training pilots both from the UK and Allied territories. The base now serves as a training centre for RAF air traffic controllers.

== Industry ==
1881 was straight after the Industrial Revolution, when advances in agricultural, textile and metal manufacturing, transportation, economic policies and social changes took place in England. However, during this period, not a huge amount of industrial change took place in this small rural parish, which was bypassed by the rising railways. The majority of the male population (145) were still working in agriculture. However, surprisingly, the majority of women (3914) were working in domestic and office work. These industrial changes took such a long time to be implemented because it was a rural parish and did not have the resources to support such heavy machinery and huge factories.

== St Andrew's Church ==
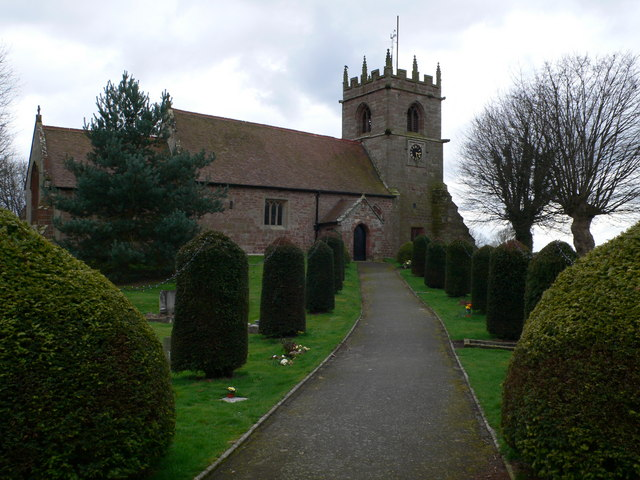
North side of St Andrew's Church

The local grade I listed church of Stanton upon Hine Heath, St Andrew's, is set in a quiet location in the south-western corner of the village. The church is grouped with neighbouring churches of Shawbury and Moreton Corbet; construction on all three buildings commenced in the 12th century.

Inside the church are two framed Rolls of Honour to parishioners who served in the respective World Wars. The First's, which lists 68 men and indicates those who died or became prisoners of war, bears charcoal drawings of a soldier, and a man and a girl either side of the list of names; the Second's has small paintings of tanks and bomber planes in action, ruined houses, a camp of tents, and crosses with wreaths placed beside them.

The parish's war memorial is in form of the wooden lych gate, built on sandstone base, within which are tablets listing four local men (out of 64 stated to have served) who died serving in World War I and two in World War II. Author Barbara Comyns Carr (1907–1992), who died in the village, is buried in the graveyard, which also contains a war grave of a soldier of World War I.

== High Hatton Hall ==
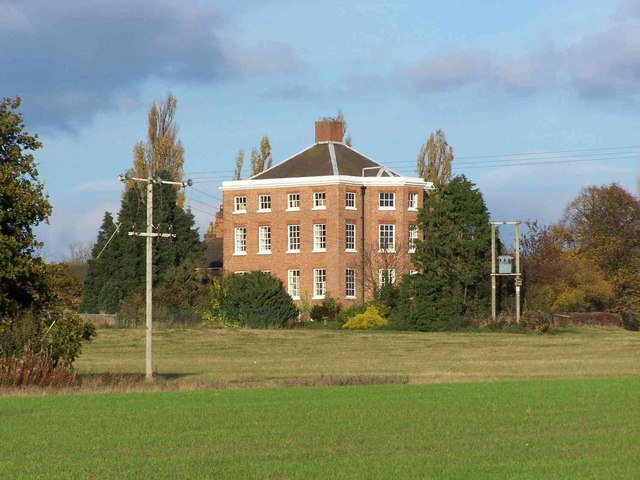
High Hatton Hall

High Hatton Hall is a small red brick country house built in 1762 with three storeys and a pyramidal roof. It is a Grade II* listed building. An elephant and castle symbol on the rainwater heads and initials on the datestone suggest that this house was built for a member of the Corbet family, probably by Thomas Farnolls Pritchard.

== Population ==
=== Trends and changes ===
Population of the parish was highest for the 1831 census with 722 residents, however, the population slowly started to shrink to a current estimated population of 529 in recent decades.

Year	Total Population	Ten Year Change
1801	599	N/A
1811	571	−28
1821	700	129
1831	722	22
1841	669	−53
1851	646	−23
1881	667	9
1891	619	−48
1901	635	16
1911	661	26
1921	652	−9
1931	634	−18
1951	590	N/A
1961	563	−27

Since the beginning of the 19th century, the population of the parish increased dramatically from 599 people to a population of 722 (127 households) in 1831. This was an increase of 20% in the population in 30 years. However, after this date, the population did not carry on increase, but started to decrease in size. By the middle of the 20th century, the population was lower than in 1801, standing at 563 (159 households) in 1961; nearly a 25% decrease in the population.

== Local Joint Committee ==
The Local Joint Committees (LJCs) enable people in each parish in Shropshire to get involved with the decision making of the Shropshire Council.

In total, there are 28 Local Joint Committees, with Stanton Upon Hine Heath being in LJC 03, along with Loppington, Myddle and Broughton, Clive, Grinshill, Hadnall, Moreton Corbet and Lee Brockhurst, Shawbury, Wem Town, Wem Rural, Whixall and Weston under Redcastle. Each Parish has a representative who, along with the Shropshire Councillors, attends the Shropshire Council four times a year, giving the locals a chance to meet with their councillors and raise issues of concern about services or problems within their committees.

== See also ==
- Listed buildings in Stanton upon Hine Heath
