= Acton Reynald Hall =

Country house in Moreton Corbet, Shropshire, England

Coordinates: 52.8047°N 2.6917°W

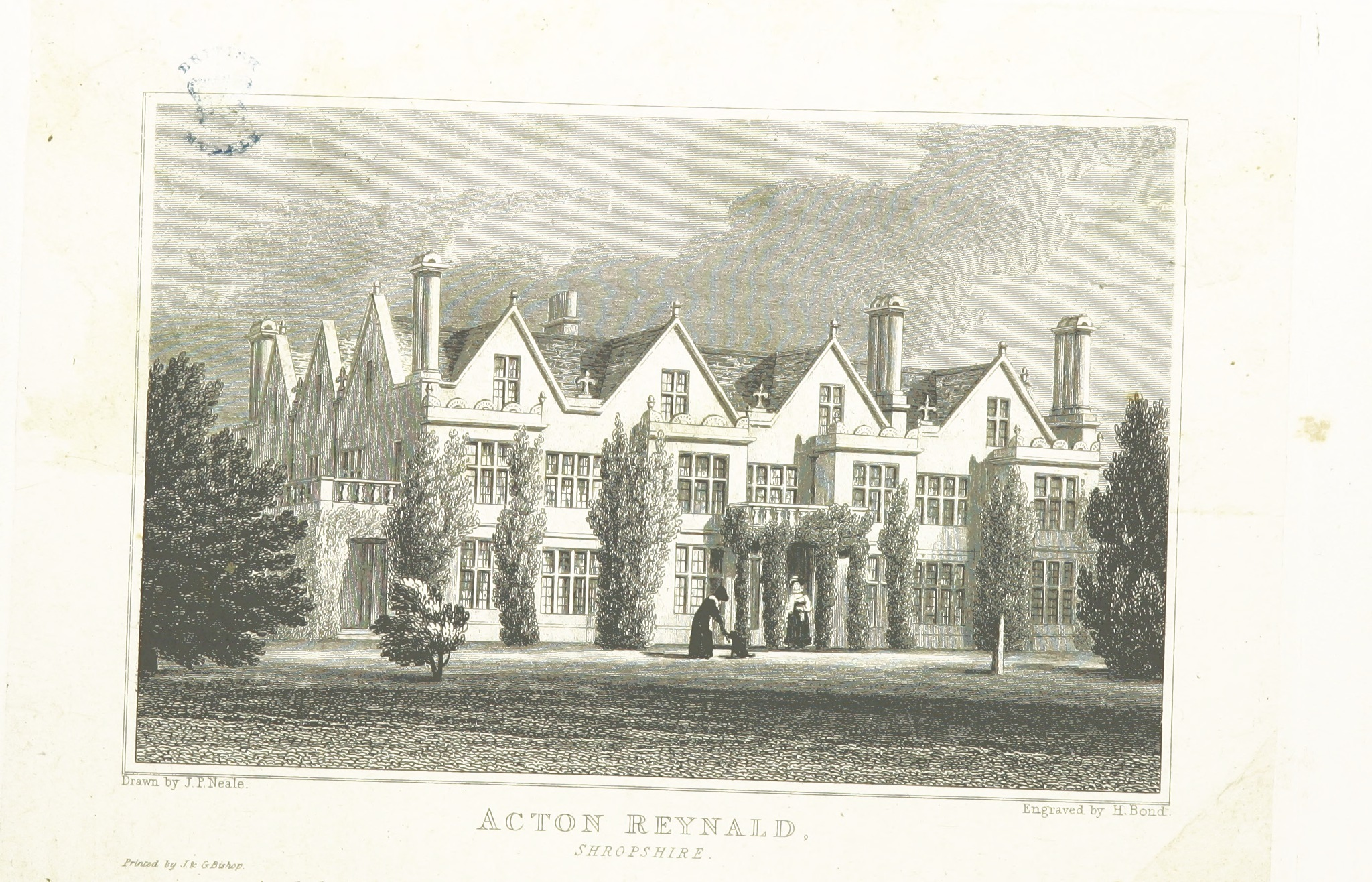
Acton Reynald Hall in 1826

Acton Reynald Hall is a 19th-century country house at Acton Reynald, Moreton Corbet, Shropshire, England. It is a Grade II* listed building.

The Corbet family abandoned nearby Moreton Corbet Castle as a residence in about 1800 after their 17th-century hall had been enlarged and improved for their occupation. Sir Andrew Corbet retained architect John Hiram Haycock (1759–1830), who created the new mansion in a Neo-Jacobean style. The seven-bayed, three-storey eastern entrance front retains three bays and a Tuscan portico dating from 1610 and 1625. The main block, dating from about 1800, was later extended by service wings in about 1840 and other improvements in 1893.

The whole of the village of Acton Reynald together with several farms was demolished in the 1840s to facilitate the creation of the park.

From about 1919 until 1995 the house was occupied by a girls' school. It is now once again a private residence.

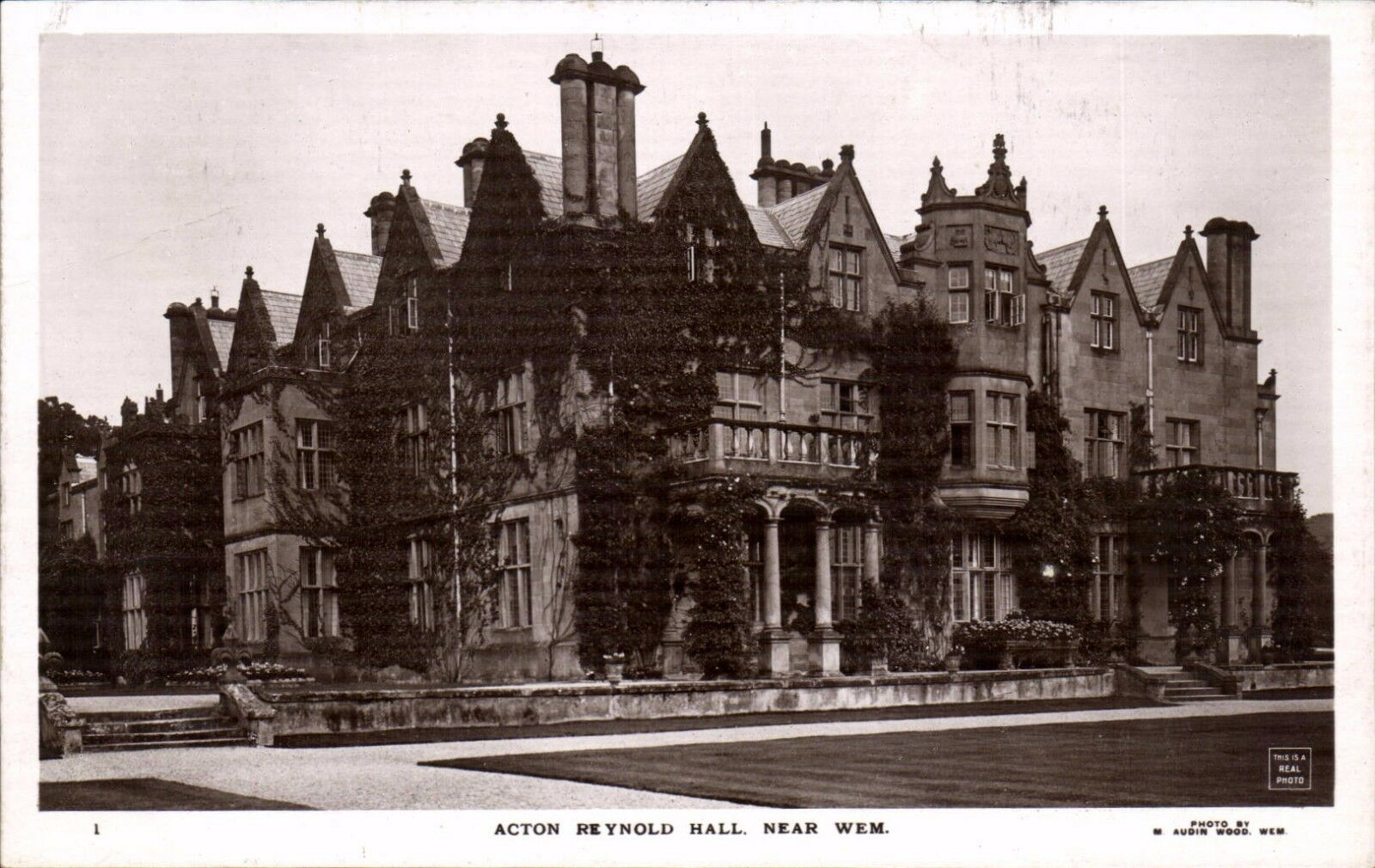
A postcard circa 1920

== See also ==
- Grade II* listed buildings in Shropshire Council (A–G)
- Listed buildings in Moreton Corbet and Lee Brockhurst
