= Acton Reynald =

Village in Shropshire, England

Coordinates: 52.80°N 2.69°W

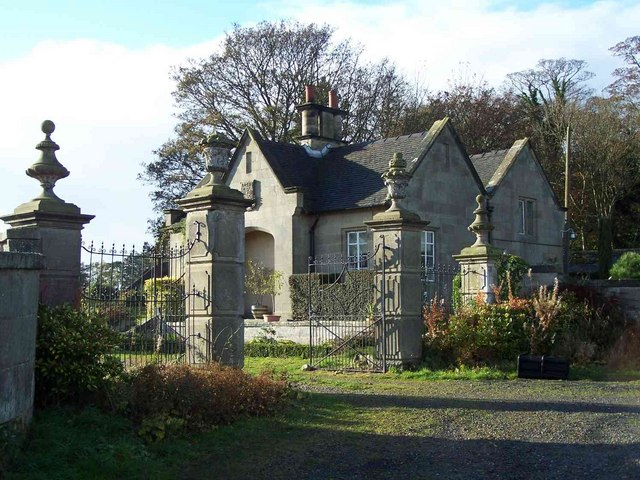
- Gatehouse, Acton Reynald

- Location within Shropshire
- OS grid reference: SJ5323
- Civil parish: Moreton Corbet and Lee Brockhurst
- Unitary authority: Shropshire
- Ceremonial county: Shropshire
- Region: West Midlands
- Country: England
- Sovereign state: United Kingdom
- Post town: SHREWSBURY
- Postcode district: SY4
- Dialling code: 01939
- Police: West Mercia
- Fire: Shropshire
- Ambulance: West Midlands
- UK Parliament: North Shropshire

Acton Reynald is a village in the north of Shropshire, England. The village is more of a hamlet in that it does not contain a public house, Post Office, or any other features typically associated with villages. It is close to the A49 which runs from Ross-on-Wye on the Welsh border to Bamber Bridge in Lancashire. The village backs on to RAF Shawbury and the village of Moreton Corbet to its east.

The village's largest building is Acton Reynald Hall, a former seat of the local landowning Corbet family, which was a private girls' school from 1919 to 1995 before reverting to being a private residence. In the 1840s the whole existing village of Acton Reynold together with several farms was demolished to facilitate the creation of the parkland.

== See also ==
- Listed buildings in Moreton Corbet and Lee Brockhurst
