= Listed buildings in Stanton upon Hine Heath =

Stanton upon Hine Heath is a civil parish in Shropshire, England. It contains 15 listed buildings that are recorded in the National Heritage List for England. Of these, one is are listed at Grade I, the highest of the three grades, one is at Grade II*, the middle grade, and the others are at Grade II, the lowest grade. The parish contains the village of Stanton upon Hine Heath and smaller settlements, and is otherwise rural. Most of the listed buildings are farmhouses, farm buildings and houses, the older of which are timber framed or have a timber-framed core. The other listed buildings are a 12th-century church and items in the churchyard, a country house and associated structures, and a milepost.

== Key ==
Grade	Criteria
I	Buildings of exceptional interest, sometimes considered to be internationally important
II*	Particularly important buildings of more than special interest
II	Buildings of national importance and special interest

== Buildings ==
Name and location	Photograph	Date	Notes	Grade
St Andrew's Church; 52.80993°N 2.64220°W		12th century	The lower part of the tower dates from the 13th century and the upper parts from the late 14th century, the porch is dated 1595, the east end of the chancel was rebuilt in 1740, and the church was restored in 1892. It is built in sandstone, with some 12th-century herringbone work, and the roofs are tiled. The church consists of a nave, a north porch, a chancel and a west tower. The tower has three stages, stepped diagonal buttresses, gargoyles at the corners of the belfry, a coved string course, an embattled parapet with moulded coping crocketed pinnacles, and a weathervane.	I
Grave cover 52.80998°N 2.64236°W	—	15th century (probable)	The grave cover is in the churchyard of St Andrew's Church. It is in red sandstone, and has an inscribed cross and border, but is broken into two parts.	II
Stable block northeast of High Hatton Hall; 52.82031°N 2.58505°W	—	Early to mid 17th century	Farm buildings, later a stable block, it is timber framed with brick nogging on a sandstone plinth, and has been partly rebuilt in red brick. The roof is tiled, hipped to the north and with a parapeted gable end to the south with moulded kneelers and a finial. There is one storey and a loft, four bays and a rear outshut. The block contains casement windows, a segmental-headed doorway and stable doors.	II
Booley House Farmhouse; 52.82478°N 2.63321°W	—	Mid to late 17th century	The farmhouse was altered and extended in the 19th century. It is timber framed with plastered infill on a high chamfered red sandstone plinth, and has a tile roof. There are two storeys and an attic, three bays, a sandstone extension to the left with one storey and an attic, and a two-storey brick right wing. The gabled porch is in brick, and the doorway has a fanlight. Most of the windows are casements, there are two gabled eaves dormers in the main part, and sash windows in the right wing.	II
Moston Cottage; 52.83428°N 2.65367°W	—	Mid to late 17th century	The cottage is timber framed with plaster infill and an asbestos slate roof. There is one storey and an attic, two bays, and a rendered one-storey lean-to recessed to the left. The windows are casements, and there are two gabled eaves dormers.	II
Stable block and coach house northwest of High Hatton Hall; 52.82024°N 2.58545°W	—	Late 17th century	The farm buildings, later a stable block and coach house, were largely rebuilt in the 18th century. They are in red brick incorporating a timber framed core, and have a tile roof with a parapeted gable to the south. There is one storey and an attic, and the building contains doorways, some with segmental heads, a loft door, and casement windows. In the south gable end is a blind circular opening and a gabled bellcote.	II
Sundial; 52.81045°N 2.64153°W		Late 17th century	The sundial stands by the path leading to St Andrew's Church. It is in sandstone and consists of a baluster shaft with a moulded base and capital on two circular steps. The sundial has a square dial block, a dated circular copper dial plate, and a gnomon.	II
Churchyard wall 52.80977°N 2.64265°W	—	Early 18th century	The wall encloses the churchyard of St Andrew's Church, and was enlarged later in the 18th and in the 19th century. It is in sandstone with chamfered coping. In the wall is an inscribed coping block.	II
Mill House; 52.81289°N 2.64272°W	—	Early to mid 18th century	A brick house with a dentilled eaves cornice, and a tile roof with parapeted gable ends, moulded kneelers, and rounded coping. There are two storeys and an attic, three bays, an extension recessed to the left, and a gabled rear wing. The central doorway has a bracketed hood, the windows are casements, and the window above the doorway is blind.	II
Bridge near Moreton Mill; 52.80048°N 2.63200°W	—	1759–61	The road bridge and sluices cross the River Roden. The bridge is in red brick with stone dressings, and consists of a round arch flanked by two segmental arches. On the downstream side are keystones and a parapet with chamfered coping. The upstream side has wooden guides and iron fittings for five sluices.	II
High Hatton Hall; 52.81996°N 2.58513°W		1762	A small country house built in brick on a chamfered sandstone plinth with moulded cornice and a pyramidal slate roof. There are three storeys and a basement, an east (entrance) of three bays, the middle bay slightly projecting, a south front if five bays, the middle three bays forming a canted projection, and the west front has four bays. To the north is a pair of two-storey gabled service wings. Steps lead up to the doorway that has an architrave, a pulvinated frieze, and a moulded cornice on large console brackets.	II*
Garden wall and summerhouse, High Hatton Hall; 52.82004°N 2.58575°W	—	c. 1762 (probable)	The garden wall is in red brick with grey sandstone coping, and is ramped up to the summerhouse. It is about 2.5 metres (8 ft 2 in) high and 70 metres (230 ft) long. The summerhouse is in red brick with grey sandstone dressings, and has a tile roof with parapeted gables. On the front is an open triangular pedimented gable with a truncated finial that has a circular sundial with a gnomon in the tympanum. Steps lead up to the entrance that has a Palladian motif, and there are circular windows in the rear and left walls.	II
Terrace retaining wall, High Hatton Hall; 52.81971°N 2.58575°W	—	c. 1762 (probable)	The retaining wall to the south of the terrace is in red brick with chamfered grey sandstone coping, and is about 1 metre (3 ft 3 in) high and 50 metres (160 ft) long. Near the centre is a flight of seven steps flanked by low walls with stone-capped square piers.	II
Teese Memorial and enclosure 52.80978°N 2.64214°W	—	1825	The memorial is in the churchyard of St Andrew's Church, and is to the memory of William Teese. It is in grey sandstone and in the form of a sarcophagus. The memorial has globe feet, a moulded plinth, reeded corner piers, a moulded cornice, a chamfered top, a large urn finial with carved paterae, and recessed panels. It is enclosed by wrought iron railings.	II
Milepost; 52.80333°N 2.62249°W	—	Mid 19th century	The milepost is in cast iron, and has a triangular section with a chamfered top. It is inscribed with the distances in miles to "SALOP" (Shrewsbury) and to "DRAYTON" (Market Drayton).	II
