= River Roden =

The River Roden may refer to:

- The River Roden, Shropshire, a tributary of the River Tern in England
- The River Roden, Berkshire, a tributary of the River Pang in England
