= Listed buildings in Moreton Corbet and Lee Brockhurst =

Moreton Corbet and Lee Brockhurst is a civil parish in Shropshire, England. It contains 45 listed buildings that are recorded in the National Heritage List for England. Of these, three are listed at Grade I, the highest of the three grades, two are at Grade II*, the middle grade, and the others are at Grade II, the lowest grade. The parish contains the villages and smaller settlements of Acton Reynald, Moreton Corbet, Lee Brockhurst, and Preston Brockhurst, and the surrounding countryside. Most of the listed buildings are houses and cottages, farmhouses and farm buildings and associated structures, the earliest of which are timber framed. The other listed buildings include churches, memorials, a ruined castle and mansion, country houses and associated structures, a former watermill, a bridge, and two mileposts.

== Key ==
Grade	Criteria
I	Buildings of exceptional interest, sometimes considered to be internationally important
II*	Particularly important buildings of more than special interest
II	Buildings of national importance and special interest

== Buildings ==
Name and location	Photograph	Date	Notes	Grade
St Bartholomew's Church; 52.80494°N 2.65244°W		12th century	The oldest parts of the church are the chancel and the nave, the south aisle was added in the early 14th century, the west tower dates from about 1539 with its top stage added in 1769, the squire's pew was added and other alterations were carried out in 1778, and the church was restored in 1883. The older parts of the church are built in red sandstone, the later parts are in yellow-grey Grinshill sandstone, and the roof is tiled. The tower has three stages, diagonal buttresses, a northeast stair turret, a moulded cornice, a plain parapet with a cartouche, and decorative corner pinnacles. The west window in the aisle is in the form of a spherical triangle, and the east window has four lights.	I
St Peter's Church; 52.84012°N 2.67526°W		Mid-12th century	The Norman church was restored and the chancel and bellcote were added in 1884. It is in sandstone with a tile roof, and consists of a nave, a south porch, a chancel, a north vestry and a brick store shed. The bellcote is on the west gable. The south doorway has scalloped capitals and two rows of chevrons.	II*
Moreton Corbet Castle; 52.80397°N 2.65218°W		c. 1200	This consists of the ruins of a Norman castle and an Elizabethan mansion, all in sandstone. The castle remains include a gatehouse, a keep, a curtain wall, and a great hall in the east range. The remains of the mansion have two storeys over a plinth with ogee-shaped gables, and Classical columns carrying richly carved entablatures. The windows are mullioned and transomed, and the decorative features include heraldic beasts, foliage, obelisks and ball finials.	I
The Old Rectory; 52.80512°N 2.65268°W		15th or 16th century (probable)	The rectory, later a private house, was altered and extended in the 17th and 19th centuries. It is timber framed and rendered, partly rebuilt and extended in red brick, and has a tile roof. The house is partly in one storey with an attic, and partly in two storeys. The original range has three bays, a parallel range was added to the northeast and there were extensions to the northwest. There is a gabled porch, the windows are casements, the gables are jettied with moulded bressumers on carved brackets, and there are four large eaves dormers.	II
Manor House; 52.83857°N 2.67324°W	—	Early 16th century (probable)	The house was later remodelled and extended. It is timber framed and has a tile roof. There is one storey and an attic, three bays, and a rear outshut. On the front is a doorway with a gabled timber porch, the windows are casements, and above the door is a raking dormer.	II
Barn and cow house, Castle Farm; 52.80388°N 2.65417°W		Late 16th century (probable)	The farm buildings were altered and extended in 1863. They are in red brick with sandstone dressings, quoins, and a tile roof. They have one storey and a loft, and a one-storey block to the left. The buildings contain four loft openings, a Tudor arched doorway, a mullioned window, a segmental-headed stable door, a datestone, and vents in diamond patterns.	II
Corbet Lodge; 52.80461°N 2.65640°W	—	c. 1600	The house was later extended. It is timber framed with brick nogging on a brick plinth and has a tile roof. The original part has two storeys and three bays, and the extensions have one storey and an attic, one extension has one bay, and there is a rear wing. There is a gabled porch, the windows are casements, there is a large central eaves dormer, and the gable end contains a moulded bressumer. Inside the house are panels with wattle and daub infill.	II
Manor Farmhouse; 52.84059°N 2.67575°W	—	c. 1600	The farmhouse was altered and extended in the 19th century. It is basically timber framed and mainly roughcast, with extensions in brick and sandstone, and a tile roof. The farmhouse has an L-shaped plan, consisting of a hall range with one storey and 2½ bays, a gabled cross-wing slightly projecting on the left with two storeys and two bays, the hall range has been extended by one bay, and there is an addition in the rear angle. The windows are casements, and in the hall range is an ornamental gabled wooden porch and a gabled eaves dormer.	II
3 and 4 Church Road; 52.83930°N 2.67401°W	—	Early 17th century	A farmhouse, later a private house, it was remodelled in the 18th century and later altered and extended. The house is timber framed and encased and rebuilt in brick, and has a slate roof. There are two storeys, a band, casement windows, and a doorway with a flat hood.	II
Acton Reynald Hall; 52.80464°N 2.69156°W		Early 17th century	A country house, at one time used as a school, it was enlarged in about 1800, in about 1840, and again in 1893–94. The house is built in Grinshill sandstone, and has slate roofs, two storeys, attics and a basement. The east front has seven bays, four gables, and four two-storey bay windows. In the centre is a balustraded porch with unfluted Doric columns. At the north end is a lower service wing. The south front has five bays, a central two-storey oriel window, and two loggias, and the west front has five gables.	II*
Besford House Farmhouse; 52.82010°N 2.66763°W	—	Early to mid-17th century	The farmhouse was altered and extended in the 19th century. It is timber framed with brick nogging on a sandstone plinth, the right end wall is pebbledashed, the extension is in brick, and the roof is tiled. There are two storeys and an attic, three bays, a two-storey rear wing, and a lean-to in the angle. The central doorway has a moulded architrave and a gabled porch, the windows are casements, and there are three gabled eaves dormers.	II
Wain House Farmhouse; 52.83771°N 2.69954°W	—	Early to mid-17th century	The farmhouse was extended and altered in the 19ith century. It is timber framed with brick nogging, refronted and extended in red brick, and has a tile roof. The farmhouse consists of a two-bay hall range with one storey and an attic, a rear wing of one bay, a projecting gabled cross-wing with two storeys and two bays, and a 20th-century lean-to garage on the left. There is a gabled porch, the windows are casements, and there are two gabled eaves dormers.	II
The Old Manor House; 52.81695°N 2.68903°W		c. 1650	Also known as Preston Hall, it is a small country house that was extended in about 1700. It is in grey sandstone on a chamfered plinth, and has a slate roof with parapeted gables and moulded copings. There are two storeys, an attic and a basement, and an E-shaped plan with a rear extension. The front is symmetrical with five bays and three gables. In the centre is a square projecting two-storey porch with a balustraded parapet. The doorway has fluted Doric pilasters and an open triangular pediment containing an armorial cartouche. The windows are mullioned and transomed.	I
Service block, The Old Manor House; 52.81705°N 2.68937°W	—	Mid-17th century	The service block was extended in about 1700. It is in sandstone with a tile roof. The original part has two storeys and an attic, and the extension has one storey and an attic. The windows are mullioned, and there are two small gabled eaves dormers containing casement windows.	II
5 and 6 Church Road; 52.83970°N 2.67410°W	—	Mid-17th century	A farmhouse, later extended and divided into two cottages, it is timber framed with brick infill and a tile roof. There is one storey and an attic, and probably three bays. The windows are casements, and there is a large gabled half-dormer.	II
Brock Cottage; 52.81642°N 2.68658°W		Mid-17th century	The cottage is timber framed with brick nogging and a tile roof. There is one storey and an attic, and four bays. On the front is a bracketed gabled porch, the windows are casements, and there are four gabled eaves dormers on the front and four more on the rear.	II
Grove Farmhouse; 52.81958°N 2.68825°W	—	Mid-17th century (probable)	The farmhouse was remodelled and extended in the 19th century. It is basically timber framed with red brick nogging, it is pebbledashed, and has tile roofs. There are two storeys and an attic, and two parallel ranges, one long, and one shorter. The central doorway has a moulded architrave, a hood mould, and a lean-to timber porch. The windows are mullioned and transomed with casements.	II
Lee Hall Farmhouse; 52.83989°N 2.67491°W	—	17th century (probable)	The farmhouse was later altered and extended, mainly in the 19th century. It is timber framed and roughcast, the extensions are in brick, and the roof is partly tiled and partly slated. Originally it consisted of a two-storey hall range, and a cross-wing with two storeys and an attic, a parallel range was added to the rear of the hall range, and the cross-wing was extended. On the front is a gabled porch, there is a canted bay window, the other windows are casements, some with segmental heads, and the attic of the cross-wing is jettied.	II
Preston Farmhouse; 52.81744°N 2.68746°W	—	Mid-17th century	The farmhouse was extended in the 18th century with the addition of a rear wing. It is timber framed with brick nogging on a partly chamfered grey sandstone plinth, rendered at the rear, and with a tile roof. There are two storeys, and a main range of three bays, a rear wing, and a one-storey outshut in the angle. The windows vary, and include casements, some are mullioned and transomed windows, and there are cross-windows and sash windows.	II
The White House; 52.81715°N 2.68726°W		Mid-17th century	The house was altered and extended in the 18th and 19th centuries. The original part is timber framed with brick nogging, the extensions and rebuilding are in brick, and the roof is tiled. The house has a T-shaped plan, with a range at right angles to the road with two storeys and three bays, and at the rear wings to the north and south with one storey and attics. The windows are casements.	II
Stable block, The Old Manor House; 52.81725°N 2.68900°W	—	1696	The stable block is in sandstone on a moulded plinth, with a hipped tile roof. There are two storeys, a shallow U-shaped plan, and a front of five bays. In the centre is a doorway with a moulded surround, and the windows are mullioned.	II
Entrance gates and gate piers southeast of The Old Manor House; 52.81570°N 2.68739°W	—	c. 1700	The gate piers are in grey sandstone. They have a square plan, and each has three square panels on the front and sides, and a cap with a small globe finial. The gates are in wrought iron and have elaborate scrolling.	II
Walls, gates and gate piers east of The Old Manor House; 52.81695°N 2.68873°W		c. 1700	The walls enclose three sides of the forecourt of the house, they are in grey sandstone, on a chamfered plinth and have chamfered coping. In the centre are gate piers, each with a moulded plinth, chamfered rustication, a moulded cornice, a stepped cap, and a globe finial, and between them are wrought iron gates. The terrace retaining wall has a rounded top, and there is a central flight of nine steps with curved walls.	II
Gate and gate piers, Grove Farm; 52.81938°N 2.68833°W	—	Early 18th century	The gate piers are in Grinshill sandstone. Each has a square plan, a moulded plinth, chamfered rustication, a moulded cornice, and a large globe finial. The gate is in wrought iron.	II
Knight memorial 52.80479°N 2.65269°W		1734	The memorial is in the churchyard of St Bartholomew's Church, and is to the memory of Ann Knight. It is in grey sandstone, and consists of a headstone with an elaborate scrolled surround in Baroque style, with a central inscribed panel.	II
Former brew house and pigsties, The Old Manor House; 52.81724°N 2.68953°W	—	Early to mid-18th century	The farm buildings are in sandstone with tile roofs. The brewhouse is the earlier, and has a pyramidal roof, one storey, a plinth, windows and doors. The range of pigsties, dating from the mid-to late 19th century, contains doors, and in front are projecting pen walls.	II
Wall and gate piers north of The Old Manor House; 52.81713°N 2.68909°W	—	Mid-18th century	The wall and gate piers are in grey sandstone. The walls have an L-plan, and enclose a small service courtyard. They have chamfered coping, and are about 1 metre (3 ft 3 in) high. Each of the pair of square gate piers has a moulded plinth, panels, and a moulded cornice.	II
Moreton Mill; 52.80035°N 2.63263°W	—	c. 1760	Originally a forge producing wrought iron, later a water-powered corn mill and sawmill, it is in red brick and sandstone, with dentilled eaves and tiled roofs. There are two storeys with a basement and attics, six bays, and a single-storey sawmill at the west end. Most of the openings have segmental heads, and these include doorways, a hatch door to the wheel pit, and windows.	II
Dovecote, The Old Manor House; 52.81720°N 2.68989°W	—	Mid- to late 18th century	The dovecote is in red brick and has a square plan. In the south front are a casement window and a doorway, both with segmental heads, and in the east front is a blocked door.	II
Gates, gate piers, and walls, St Bartholomew's Church; 52.80457°N 2.65360°W		Late 18th century	The gateway is at the entrance to the churchyard. The gate piers are in ashlar stone, each with a moulded plinth, panels, a moulded cornice, and a large globe finial. The right pier carries an inscription. The gates are in wrought iron, and they are flanked by sandstone walls with chamfered coping. Each is about 35 metres (115 ft) long and 0.5 metres (1 ft 8 in) high, and ending in a square pier with a pyramidal cap.	II
Besford Grange Farmhouse and railings 52.82053°N 2.66815°W	—	Late 18th century	A red brick farmhouse with a dentil eaves cornice, and a tile roof with parapeted gabled ends. There are two storeys, three bays, and a rear wing. The central doorway has a moulded architrave, a radial fanlight, and an open triangular pedimented hood on scrolled brackets, and the windows are sashes. Attached to the house is a low brick wall with stone coping, iron railings, and square end piers with pyramidal caps.	II
Coach house and stable block, Besford Grange Farm; 52.82067°N 2.66825°W	—	Late 18th century	The building is in red brick with a dentil eaves cornice, and a tile roof with parapeted gable ends. There are two storeys, and the building contains doorways, windows, a loft door, a circular pitching hole, and a dovecote in the gable end with three tiers of openings.	II
Lee Bridge House; 52.83700°N 2.67180°W		Late 18th century	The house, at one time an inn, is in red brick on a sandstone plinth, with a moulded eaves cornice on the front, a dentil eaves cornice at the rear, and a slate roof with coped verges. There are three storeys, and an L-shaped plan with a three-bay front and a rear wing. The central doorway has a rectangular fanlight and a semicircular hood. The windows are sashes, those in the ground floor in round-headed recesses with an impost band.	II
Lee Bridge; 52.83645°N 2.67159°W	—	1800	The bridge carries a road over the River Roden. It is in sandstone and consists of a single segmental arch. The bridge has chamfered and rusticated voussoirs, pilaster buttresses, a string course to the parapet, and curving wing walls ending in octagonal piers with pyramidal caps.	II
Kitchen garden walls south of The Old Manor House; 52.81573°N 2.68889°W	—	Late 18th or early 19th century	The walls enclose the kitchen garden on four sides in an irregular square plan. They are in red brick with chamfered stone coping. There are square piers at the corners with pyramidal stone caps, and three gateways.	II
Obelisk; 52.83698°N 2.67156°W		1812	The obelisk is a monument in sandstone. It is tapering with a square plan, and has a moulded plinth and a square base. On the plinth is an inscription.	II
Corbet Memorial near Acton Reynald Hall; 52.80470°N 2.69601°W	—	1821	The memorial was erected to commemorate the birth of Vincent Rowland Corbet, and stands on a mound to the west of Acton Reynald Hall. It is in grey sandstone and consists of a tall tapering obelisk with a plinth on a base of two steps. The plinth has a coved cornice, a carved raven, and panelled sides, one panel carrying an inscription.	II
Former stable block, Acton Reynald Hall; 52.80505°N 2.69125°W	—	1840	The stable block is in grey sandstone with slate roofs. It has a square plan with four ranges around a courtyard, it is in Tudor Revival style, and is partly in one and partly in two storeys. The east range has seven bays, and a central three-bay gatehouse with a moulded Tudor archway, over which is a large armorial display. Above this is a tall octagonal wooden cupola with an ogee lead dome, a globe finial and a weathervane. The windows in the block are mullioned and transomed.	II
Sundial, Acton Reynald Hall; 52.80442°N 2.69206°W	—	c. 1840	The sundial is in the garden of the hall. It is in red sandstone, and has a square plinth with panelled sides and a chamfered top. The dial block is square and has moulded corners and panelled sides, and the copper dial is circular and inscribed, and has a gnomon.	II
Urn, Acton Reynald Hall; 52.80438°N 2.69148°W	—	c. 1840	The urn is in the garden of the hall. It is in red sandstone, and stands on an octagonal three-stepped base. The urn has a square base, a tapered ornamental stem, carved foliage on the underside, and an overhanging lip.	II
Walls, gates and gate piers, Acton Reynald Hall; 52.80430°N 2.69127°W	—	c. 1840	The walls and gate piers are in grey sandstone. The walls enclose the east, south and west sides of the forecourt, and have a U-shaped plan, with a chamfered string course and chamfered coping. There are corner piers, and gate piers and wrought iron gates. The terrace retaining walls are to the south and east of the house, and include a short flight of steps.	II
Garden wall, pavilions and terrace wall, Acton Reynald Hall; 52.80527°N 2.69223°W	—	1847	The wall that encloses the kitchen garden is in red brick with stone coping, and is decorated with various features, including shell lunettes and busts. In the centre is a gateway that has square piers with mouled caps and urn finials, and wrought iron gates, and above them is a coat of arms. The wall is about 70 metres (230 ft) long and 2 metres (6 ft 7 in) high. It is flanked by sandstone pavilions, each with three bays, octagonal piers, chamfered arches, parapets, and central shields. There are also terrace walls with octagonal corner piers and a central flight of steps.	II
Milepost near Bridleway Gate; 52.83022°N 2.68081°W	—	Mid-19th century	The mile post is on the east side of the A49 road. It is in cast iron, with a triangular section, hollow at the back, and with a chamfered top. The milepost is inscribed with the distances in miles to "SALOP" (Shrewsbury) and to Whitchurch.	II
Milepost near Lee Brockhurst; 52.83943°N 2.66384°W	—	Late 19th century	The mile post is on the east side of the A49 road. It is in cast iron, with a triangular section, hollow at the back, and with a chamfered top. The milepost is inscribed with the distances in miles to "SALOP" (Shrewsbury) and to Whitchurch.	II
Corbet Memorial, St Bartholomew's Churchyard; 52.80495°N 2.65277°W		1904	The memorial is in the churchyard of St Bartholomew's Church, and is to the memory of members of the Corbet family. It consists of a marble pedestal with a bronze sculpture of Mercury (no longer present). The pedestal has a moulded plinth, a moulded cornice, and a cap with acanthus leaves at the corners. On the sides of the pedestal are inscriptions, on the front are carvings of a festoon, an elephant and castle, and a squirrel, at the rear is a carved swag and a raven, and on the sides are wreaths.	II
