= Listed buildings in Shawbury =

Shawbury is a civil parish in Shropshire, England. It contains 30 listed buildings that are recorded in the National Heritage List for England. Of these, one is listed at Grade I, the highest of the three grades, and the others are at Grade II, the lowest grade. The parish contains the village of Shawbury and the surrounding countryside. Most of the listed buildings are houses, cottages, farmhouses and farm buildings, the earliest of which are timber framed. The other listed buildings include a church, structures in the churchyard, a public house, a summer house, a bridge, three mileposts, and a brick kiln.

== Key ==
Grade	Criteria
I	Buildings of exceptional interest, sometimes considered to be internationally important
II	Buildings of national importance and special interest

== Buildings ==
Name and location	Photograph	Date	Notes	Grade
St Mary's Church; 52.78636°N 2.65510°W		Late 12th century	Alterations and additions were made to the church during the following centuries, and it was restored in 1875. It is built in sandstone with tile roof, and consists of a nave, north and south aisles, a north porch, a chancel and a north chapel, and a west tower. The tower has two large stages, a polygonal stair turret at the southeast, angle buttresses, a clock face on the north side, a quatrefoil frieze and gargoyles, an embattled parapet with eight crocketed pinnacles, and a pyramidal cap with a weathervane. Two Norman doorways, one reset, and a Norman window have been retained.	I
Grave cover 52.78629°N 2.65520°W	—	14th century (probable)	The grave cover is in the churchyard of St Mary's Church, it is in red sandstone and is tapered. The cover is carved with a Greek cross in a quatrefoil with a stem along its length.	II
Lane End; 52.78580°N 2.60404°W	—	Early 16th century (probable)	The hall range was added to the farmhouse in 1601, and there were further additions in the 19th and 20th centuries. The early parts are timber framed with plastered infill on a sandstone plinth, the later parts are in rendered brick and sandstone, and the roofs are tiled. There are two storeys, a hall range with two bays, a flush cross-wing with two bays, and a single-storey rear service wing. The upper floor of the hall range is jettied on all three sides, and the windows are casements.	II
128 Shawbury; 52.78702°N 2.65695°W	—	Late 16th or early 17th century	The cottage was later altered and extended. The early part is timber framed with some cruck construction, brick infill, it is partly rendered, and partly rebuilt in brick. The roof is tiled, there is one storey and an attic, and two bays. On the front is a gabled porch, the windows are casements, and there are two gabled eaves dormers.	II
Inglenook; 52.79243°N 2.63860°W	—	Mid 17th century	The house was altered and extended in the 19th century. The early parts are timber framed with plastered infill panels, the rebuilding and extensions are in rendered stone and red brick, and the roof is tiled. The original part has one storey and an attic, a main range of two bays, and a flush gabled cross-wing with one bay. The gable of the cross-wing was jettied, it has been underbuilt, and contains a moulded bressumer. The windows are casements, there are two gabled eaves dormers, and the doorway has a bracketed gabled porch. The later extensions are a single-storey wing to the right with a dentilled eaves cornice, and a rear wing with one storey and an attic.	II
Moreton Mill Cottages; 52.80049°N 2.63121°W	—	17th century (possible)	A house, later two cottages, with later alterations and extensions. It is in red brick with a tile roof, partly in two storeys, and partly in one storey with an attic. The windows are casements, and there is a gabled porch and a gabled dormer.	II
Wayside; 52.78714°N 2.65799°W	—	17th century	A timber framed cottage with brick infill and a tile roof, it has one storey and an attic, two bays, and a lean-to on the right. The doorway has a gabled timber bracketed porch, the windows are casements, and there is a gabled eaves dormer.	II
Wytheford Grange Farmhouse; 52.77085°N 2.65113°W	—	17th century (probable)	The farmhouse was extended in the 19th century. The original part is in rendered timber framing on a brick plinth and the roof is tiled. There is a T-shaped plan, consisting of a main range with two storeys and an attic and two bays, and a later rear wing with two storeys. The central doorway has a moulded architrave, a rectangular fanlight, a frieze and a cornice, and the windows are casements.	II
122 Church Street; 52.78703°N 2.65573°W	—	Mid to late 17th century	A timber framed cottage with plastered infill panels, partly rebuilt in brick, and with a thatched roof. There is one storey and an attic, two bays, and a rear lean-to. In the centre is a doorway, the windows are casements, and there are two full gabled dormers.	II
Ovaisne House; 52.80016°N 2.63066°W	—	Mid to late 17th century	The house was later extended and altered. The original part is timber framed with brick infill on a red sandstone plinth, the extension is in brick painted to resemble timber framing, and the roof is tiled. There is one storey and an attic, two original bays and the extension, and a rear lean-to. The windows are casements, and there are gabled dormers on the front and the rear.	II
The Triangle; 52.79198°N 2.63981°W	—	Late 17th century	A cottage that was altered and extended in the 18th and 19th centuries. The early part is timber framed with red brick infill, rebuilding and the later parts are in red brick and sandstone, and the roof is in corrugated iron. There is one storey and an attic, two bays, a single-storey lean-to on the right, and a gabled single-storey rear wing. The windows are casements and there is a gabled eaves dormer.	II
Ivy House and railings 52.78711°N 2.65652°W	—	Late 17th or early 18th century	The oldest part is the rear wing, with the main block dated 1800. The rear wing is timber framed with brick infill on a brick plinth, and there is one storey and an attic. The later part is in red brick with two storeys and an attic and three bays, and the roof is slated. Steps lead up to a central doorway that has a three-part fanlight and a bracketed flat hood, with a datestone above. The windows are sashes, and in the rear wing are two small gabled eaves dormers. In front of the house are wrought iron railings on a sandstone plinth with a central gate.	II
Wytheford House Farmhouse; 52.76850°N 2.63706°W	—	Early 18th century	The farmhouse is in red brick on a chamfered sandstone plinth, with sandstone dressings, a moulded eaves cornice, and a two-span slate roof with coped parapeted gables. The house has two storeys and an attic, a double-depth plan, and a front of five bays. In the centre is a gabled porch and a doorway with reeded pilaster strips, an architrave, and a moulded cornice. The windows are sashes, and the windows and doorway have keyed segmental lintels. At the southeast is a single-storey service wing.	II
The Elephant and Castle Hotel; 52.78743°N 2.65576°W		1734	The public house was remodelled in the 19th century. It is in rendered brick on a sandstone plinth, with a dentilled eaves cornice, and a slate roof, hipped to the right, and with parapeted coped gables. There are two storeys and an L-shaped plan, with a four-bay front range, and a three-bay rear wing on the right. On the front is a stuccoed Tuscan porch and a doorway with a rectangular fanlight, above which is a painted datestone, and the windows are sashes.	II
Summerhouse southwest of Oakmead; 52.78830°N 2.65655°W	—	c. 1735	The former summer house is in red brick on a moulded plinth, with sandstone dressings, chamfered quoins, and a hipped tile roof. It has a square plan, and contains doorways and windows, some blocked.	II
Headstone; 52.78621°N 2.65501°W	—	Early to mid 18th century	The headstone is in the churchyard of St Mary's Church, and is in grey sandstone. It consists of a pair of fluted Doric pilasters supporting sections of an entablature and an open segmental pediment.	II
1–4 The Post House; 52.78736°N 2.65597°W	—	Mid 18th century	Originally a pair of houses with possibly a 17th-century core, it was later divided into flats. The house is partly in rendered timber framing and partly in brick, on a plinth, with a band, a dentilled eaves cornice, and a tile roof. There is a front range with two storeys and an attic and four bays, and a rear gabled wing with one storey and an attic. On the front is a cast iron lattice porch with a tented lead roof, and a doorway with a moulded architrave and a radial fanlight. The windows are sashes, and there are three gabled eaves dormers.	II
1–3 Wytheford Yard; 52.76794°N 2.63764°W	—	Mid 18th century	A house that was extended in the 19th century and divided into three. It is in red brick with a dentilled eaves cornice, the extension has red sandstone quoins and a rendered gable end, and the roof is tiled with parapeted gable ends. The original part has two storeys and an attic, and the extension has two storeys. There are two porches, one gabled, and one with a hipped roof, the windows are casements, and the windows and doorways have segmental heads.	II
Shawbury Bridge; 52.78741°N 2.65159°W		Mid 18th century	The bridge, which was widened in 1936, carries the A53 road over the River Roden. It is in sandstone, and consists of three round arches with voussoirs and raised triple keystones. The bridge has cutwaters with concave tops, pilaster buttresses, a string course, parapets, and angled wing walls.	II
Cow houses northeast of Wytheford Hall; 52.76753°N 2.63686°W	—	Mid 18th century	The cowhouses are in red brick, and have tile roofs with crow-stepped coped parapeted gables. There is one storey and a loft, and they contain windows and doorways with segmental heads, lozenge-shaped vents, and gabled loft dormers.	II
Sundial; 52.78650°N 2.65535°W	—	Late 18th century	The sundial is in the churchyard of St Mary's Church. It is in grey sandstone, and has a base of four circular steps. On this is a Tuscan column and an inscribed copper dial.	II
The Old Vicarage; 52.78683°N 2.65534°W	—	Late 18th century	The vicarage, later a private house, was remodelled in the 19th century. It is in rendered brick on a plinth, and has a two-span slate roof with parapeted gable ends. There are three storeys, three bays, a single-storey extension to the left, and a parallel rear range with two storeys and an attic. At the centre is a porch with paired fluted Doric columns and an entablature. The windows are sashes with plain architraves.	II
Castle View; 52.79280°N 2.63623°W	—	Late 18th or early 19th century	A red brick house with a dentilled eaves cornice and a tile roof with coped parapeted gables. There are two storeys, three bays, and a single-bay extension to the left. The doorway has a moulded architrave and a bracketed flat hood, the windows are casements with segmental heads, and in the extension are garage doors.	II
Railings; 52.78733°N 2.65585°W	—	Early 19th century	The railings extend along the fronts of 1–4 The Post House and part of The Elephant and Castle Hotel. They are in cast iron on a chamfered sandstone base, and are about 22 metres (72 ft) long. The railings contain two wrought iron gates.	II
The Groves; 52.78655°N 2.64768°W	—	Early 19th century	A red brick house on a plinth, with a dentilled eaves cornice and a slate roof. There are three storeys, three bays, and a single-storey rear wing. The central doorway has pilaster strips with moulded capitals, an impost band, a radial fanlight, and a moulded cornice on large shaped brackets. The windows are sashes.	II
Milepost near Field House; 52.77632°N 2.63778°W	—	Early to mid 19th century	The milepost is on the east side of the B5063 road. It is in cast iron and has a triangular section and beaded corners. The milepost is inscribed with the distances in miles to Wellington and to Wem.	II
Milepost near Shawbury Bridge; 52.78754°N 2.65184°W	—	Early to mid 19th century	The milepost is on the north side of the A53 road. It is in cast iron and has a triangular section, a chamfered top and beaded corners. The milepost is inscribed with the distances in miles to Wellington and to Wem.	II
Wytheford Hall; 52.76721°N 2.63741°W	—	c. 1840	The farmhouse, possibly with an earlier core, is in red brick on a stone plinth, with sandstone dressings, overhanging eaves, and a hipped slate roof. There is a T-shaped plan consisting of a main range with two storeys and five bays, and a rear wing of two storeys and an attic and three bays. In the centre is a Tuscan porch with an open triangular pediment, and a pair of doors with a moulded architrave. The windows are sashes with slightly segmental heads.	II
Brick kiln 52.78256°N 2.65904°W	—	Mid 19th century (probable)	The brick kiln is in red brick, and has a circular plan and a domed top with an oculus. There are nine bays divided by buttresses and each bay contains a segmental-headed recess and a smaller segmental-headed opening. To the northwest is a depressed-arched entrance.	II
Milepost near Shawbury Park; 52.77519°N 2.66654°W	—	Mid 19th century	The milepost is on the southeast side of the A53 road. It is in cast iron and has a triangular section and a chamfered top. The milepost is inscribed with the distances in miles to "SALOP" (Shrewsbury) and to "DRAYTON" (Market Drayton).	
