= Lee Brockhurst =

Village in Shropshire, England

Coordinates: 52.8405°N 2.6757°W

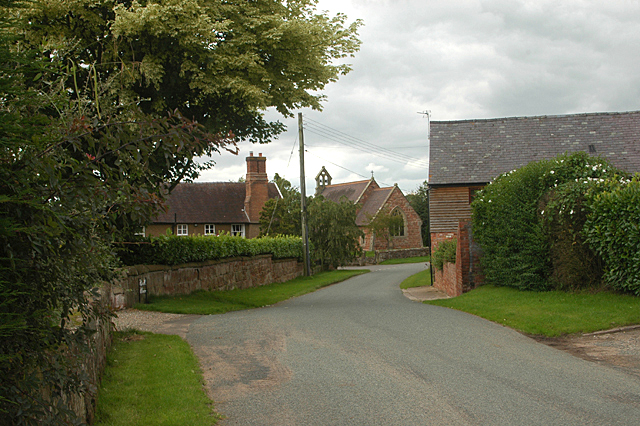
- Lee Brockhurst

- Location within Shropshire
- Population: 302 (Civil parish, 2011 Census)
- Civil parish: Moreton Corbet and Lee Brockhurst
- Unitary authority: Shropshire
- Ceremonial county: Shropshire
- Region: West Midlands
- Country: England
- Sovereign state: United Kingdom
- Post town: Shrewsbury
- Postcode district: SY4
- Dialling code: 01939
- Police: West Mercia
- Fire: Shropshire
- Ambulance: West Midlands
- UK Parliament: North Shropshire
- Website: Moreton Corbet & Lee Brockhurst Parish Council

Lee Brockhurst is a village and former civil parish, now in the parish of Moreton Corbet and Lee Brockhurst, in the Shropshire district, in the ceremonial county of Shropshire, England. It is situated around 11 miles north-northeast of the county town of Shrewsbury. In 1961 the parish had a population of 120. On 1 April 1988 the parish was abolished to form "Moreton Corbet & Lee Brockhurst".

The River Roden flows nearby to the hamlet.
