= Shawbury =

Village in Shropshire, England

- Village and civil parish
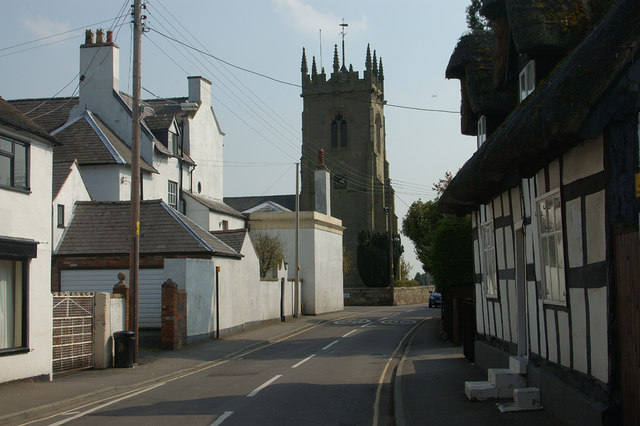
- Shawbury parish church from the village

- Location within Shropshire
- Population: 2,872 (2011)
- OS grid reference: SJ550210
  - London: 163 miles (262 km)
- Civil parish: Shawbury
- Unitary authority: Shropshire
- Ceremonial county: Shropshire
- Region: West Midlands
- Country: England
- Sovereign state: United Kingdom
- Post town: SHREWSBURY
- Postcode district: SY4
- Dialling code: 01939
- Police: West Mercia
- Fire: Shropshire
- Ambulance: West Midlands
- UK Parliament: North Shropshire

Shawbury is a village and civil parish in Shropshire, England. The village is 8 miles (13 km) northeast of Shrewsbury and 12 miles (19 km) northwest of Telford.

The village straddles the A53 between Shrewsbury and Market Drayton. The nearest railway station is at Yorton on the Welsh Marches Line for Shrewsbury/Crewe. The 2011 census recorded a population of 2,872 for the entire civil parish of Shawbury.

== History ==
In Domesday Book, Shawbury is recorded by the name Sawesberie. The main landholder was Gerard from Earl Roger of Shrewsbury. The survey also mentions that there is a church and a mill.

== Geography ==
The River Roden flows through the village. The village of Moreton Corbet, with its castle, is just to the north. The main weather station for Shropshire is located in the village at the RAF base. In December 1981, a temperature of -25.2 °C was recorded, one of the coldest on record for England.

Climate data for Shawbury (Note: RAF Shawbury is located approximately 7 miles (11 km) NE of Shrewsbury, and 12 miles (19 km) NW of Telford.) WMO ID: 03414; coordinates 52°47′41″N 2°39′53″W; elevation: 72 m (236 ft); 1991–2020 normals, extremes 1960–present
Month	Jan	Feb	Mar	Apr	May	Jun	Jul	Aug	Sep	Oct	Nov	Dec	Year
Record high °C (°F)	14.6 (58.3)	17.4 (63.3)	21.5 (70.7)	25.2 (77.4)	26.7 (80.1)	31.2 (88.2)	35.7 (96.3)	34.9 (94.8)	29.6 (85.3)	28.1 (82.6)	18.4 (65.1)	15.4 (59.7)	35.7 (96.3)
Mean daily maximum °C (°F)	7.5 (45.5)	8.1 (46.6)	10.3 (50.5)	13.2 (55.8)	16.3 (61.3)	19.1 (66.4)	21.1 (70.0)	20.7 (69.3)	18.1 (64.6)	14.2 (57.6)	10.3 (50.5)	7.7 (45.9)	13.9 (57.0)
Daily mean °C (°F)	4.3 (39.7)	4.6 (40.3)	6.3 (43.3)	8.6 (47.5)	11.5 (52.7)	14.4 (57.9)	16.3 (61.3)	16.0 (60.8)	13.7 (56.7)	10.4 (50.7)	6.9 (44.4)	4.5 (40.1)	9.8 (49.6)
Mean daily minimum °C (°F)	1.2 (34.2)	1.2 (34.2)	2.3 (36.1)	3.9 (39.0)	6.8 (44.2)	9.6 (49.3)	11.5 (52.7)	11.4 (52.5)	9.3 (48.7)	6.6 (43.9)	3.5 (38.3)	1.3 (34.3)	5.7 (42.3)
Record low °C (°F)	−21.4 (−6.5)	−12.9 (8.8)	−12.2 (10.0)	−5.9 (21.4)	−3.3 (26.1)	−0.5 (31.1)	2.5 (36.5)	0.8 (33.4)	−2.5 (27.5)	−5.9 (21.4)	−12.5 (9.5)	−25.2 (−13.4)	−25.2 (−13.4)
Average precipitation mm (inches)	57.4 (2.26)	43.3 (1.70)	43.4 (1.71)	47.1 (1.85)	53.6 (2.11)	59.0 (2.32)	57.6 (2.27)	64.2 (2.53)	61.1 (2.41)	68.8 (2.71)	60.8 (2.39)	66.3 (2.61)	682.5 (26.87)
Average snowfall mm (inches)	26 (1.0)	19 (0.7)	3 (0.1)	4 (0.2)	0 (0)	0 (0)	0 (0)	0 (0)	0 (0)	0 (0)	1 (0.0)	27 (1.1)	80 (3.1)
Average precipitation days (≥ 1.0 mm)	12.1	10.8	10.2	10.4	10.0	10.1	10.5	10.5	10.0	11.3	12.5	13.1	131.6
Average snowy days	3.0	2.9	1.1	0.3	0.0	0.0	0.0	0.0	0.0	0.0	0.2	1.6	9.1
Average relative humidity (%)	90	87	84	83	82	84	83	83	86	88	90	90	86
Mean monthly sunshine hours	52.8	74.9	114.6	158.1	194.9	187.5	193.3	168.0	134.7	97.5	61.8	49.9	1,487.8
Mean daily daylight hours	8.3	9.9	11.9	14.0	15.8	16.8	16.3	14.7	12.7	10.6	8.7	7.7	12.3
Average ultraviolet index	2	2	2	3	4	4	4	4	3	3	2	2	3
Source 1: Met Office European Climate Assessment and Dataset
Source 2: WeatherAtlas

== Governance ==
An electoral ward in the same name exists. This ward covers much of the surrounding area with a total ward population as taken at the 2011 Census of 4,666.

== Landmarks ==
There has been a church on the same site since at least the 12th century, although the present Church of England parish church of St Mary the Virgin is not from that date. Many air force personnel from RAF Shawbury, an air station founded in 1917, are buried in the churchyard, which contains 32 Commonwealth War Graves, 3 from World War I and 29 from World War II, besides 7 Polish Air Force personnel from the latter war.

The village is home to RAF Shawbury, a helicopter airfield for the Royal Air Force of the United Kingdom and home of the tri-services Defence Helicopter Flying School and air traffic control training.

== Notable people ==
- Thomas Charles (1755-1814), later Calvinistic Methodist minister and founder of the British and Foreign Bible Society, worked in Shawbury in 1783-84 as assistant to then rector, friend John Mayor
- William Hazledine (born Shawbury 1763–1840) an English ironmaster, he was a pioneer in casting structural ironwork, most notably for canal aqueducts and early suspension bridges
- Lieutenant-General Sir Richard Butler (1870-1935 in Shawbury) a British Army general during WW1, lived in retirement at Roden Lodge where he died.

== Bus service ==
Shawbury is served by the 64 route, operated by Arriva Midlands North, which runs between Shrewsbury and Market Drayton.

== Sport ==
Shawbury's football club is Shawbury United F.C.

== See also ==
- Listed buildings in Shawbury
