= Moreton Corbet =

Village in Shropshire, England

Coordinates: 52.803°N 2.652°W

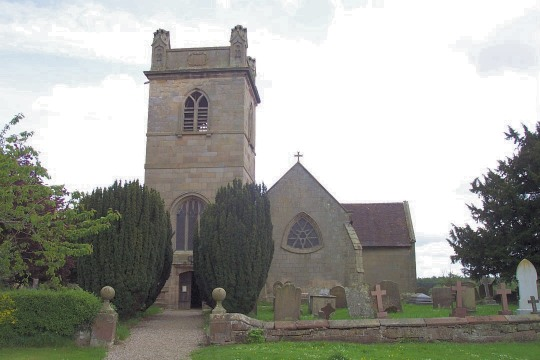
- St Bartholomew's parish church

- Location within Shropshire
- Population: 302 (2011 Census)
- OS grid reference: SJ561227
- Civil parish: Moreton Corbet and Lee Brockhurst
- Unitary authority: Shropshire
- Ceremonial county: Shropshire
- Region: West Midlands
- Country: England
- Sovereign state: United Kingdom
- Post town: Shrewsbury
- Postcode district: SY4
- Dialling code: 01939
- Police: West Mercia
- Fire: Shropshire
- Ambulance: West Midlands
- UK Parliament: North Shropshire

Moreton Corbet is a village and former civil parish, now in the parish of Moreton Corbet and Lee Brockhurst, in the Shropshire district, in the ceremonial county of Shropshire, England. The village's toponym refers to the Corbet family, the local landowners.

It is just north of the larger village of Shawbury near Stanton upon Hine Heath and the River Roden. Moreton Corbet lies about 8 miles (13 km) NNE of the market town of Shrewsbury. In the village is the ruin of Moreton Corbet Castle.

== Village ==
In 1870–72 John Marius Wilson's Imperial Gazetteer of England and Wales described Moreton Corbet thus:

A village and a parish in Wem district, Salop. The village stands on the River Roden, 3¾ miles E of Yorton r. station, and 4¾ SE of Wem. The parish contains part of the township of Preston Brockhurst, which has a post office under Shrewsbury. Pop., 255. Houses, 51. The manor and all the land belong to Sir V. R. Corbet, Bart. Moreton Corbet Castle was erected in the 16th century, on the site of a previous castle; was burnt in the civil war of Charles I; and is now a fine ruin. Several mills are on the Roden, the church is ancient; has a tower and several stained windows; and contains ancient effigies and monuments of the Corbets charities".

The village has seen steady development and population growth since then.

The 1961 census recorded a population in Moreton Corbet of 257 people, the population of the area being rather inconsistent as only 10 years earlier it reached 350. According to a 2001 census, the population of "Moreton Corbet and Lee Brockhurst" was 281: 149 males and 132 females with the biggest age range occurring between 45- and 64-year-olds.

The first census to report on how well people were housed was that of 1891, but the only statistics gathered were the number of rooms and the number of people in each household. The total amount of households rose to 72 in 1961 and further again to a total of 114 households by 2001. The majority of these households consisted of whole detached houses and bungalows, of which mainly married couples inhabited.

On 1 April 1988 the parish was abolished to form "Moreton Corbet & Lee Brockhurst", part also went to Shawbury.

Among Moreton Corbet's biggest attractions are the ruins of the castle, leading Moreton Corbet to be called "one of the most exciting places to visit in Shropshire", and described as a "magnificent and unusual, ornate ruin, that is disturbingly atmospheric".

== Castle ==
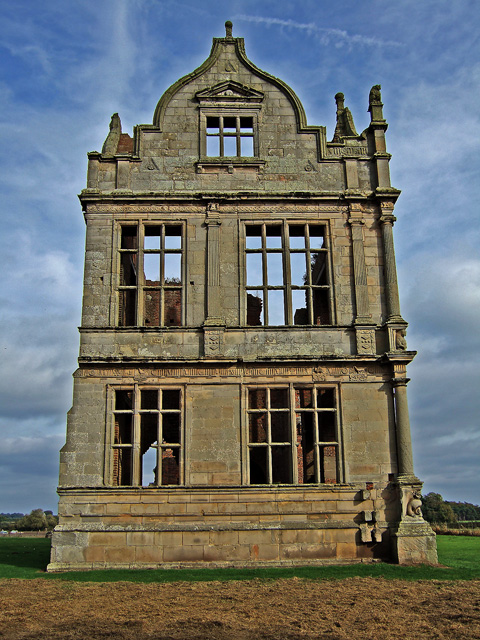
The Elizabethan wing of Moreton Corbet castle

=== Early stages ===
Moreton Corbet Castle was formerly known as the Castle at Moreton Toret, and was first built by Bartholomew Toret after the Norman Conquest of England in 1066. In about 1239 the castle passed by marriage to the Corbet family, which gave its name to the village. The Corbets still own the castle, but it is now being managed by English Heritage.

=== Development ===
Timber defences were replaced by stone in about 1200, and a gatehouse and the great tower were built. The great tower is said to be the earliest surviving building on the site, which would have dominated the medieval castle. The first-floor interior may have been a bedchamber for the lord of the castle. In the courtyard there would have stood a hall and other domestic buildings, but no trace of these survives. The gatehouse was most likely built in about the 13th century, forming the main entrance to the castle throughout its occupation. A depression in the ground in front of the gatehouse marks the line of where a ditch was, which would have been part of the castle's medieval defences. The ditch would have encircled the castle and most likely dates from the castle's first foundation. Sir Andrew Corbet, a prominent royal servant, remodelled the gatehouse around 1560. He and subsequent owners aimed to preserve the fortified medieval frontage, suggesting that the Corbets wanted the building to maintain its characteristics as a castle. A panel over the gatehouse arch commemorates Sir Andrew's work. It is carved with Sir Andrew's initials, SAC; the date 1579; and the Corbet family emblem of the elephant and castle.

Robert Corbet inherited Moreton Corbet castle in 1578 and immediately began to transform his ancestral home, influenced by his extensive travelling. He died of plague in 1583 and his brothers Richard and Vincent, who inherited the castle in turn, completed the range. In the Civil War Sir Vincent Corbet (died 1656) fought for the Royalist cause and the house was damaged in recurrent fighting. The buildings were later repaired and re-occupied.

In the 18th century the castle was abandoned as a residence and soon lost its roof. Plans were prepared in 1796 to build a new house on the site, but the project was never realised and the castle remained a ruin.

==== Paul Holmyard ====
Sir Vincent Corbet succeeded Sir Robert Corbet in the reign of James I, when Puritans were persecuted. Sir Vincent was not a Puritan but he disagreed with their persecution, so sheltered his Puritan neighbour, Paul Holmyard. As Puritan ideals become more fanatical, however, he felt he could no longer protect him and removed him from the castle. Holmyard managed to survive in the local woods for some time, eating whatever he could find, before venturing back out to Moreton Corbet. On meeting Sir Vincent he cursed the Corbet family, claiming they would never live in the castle's halls or finish repairing the building. The curse was fulfilled – at least insofar as Vincent and his son, Andrew, never lived at the house because they were so afraid. His ghost is said to haunt the grounds, stalking the empty walls to ensure the castle is not rebuilt.

== Parish church ==
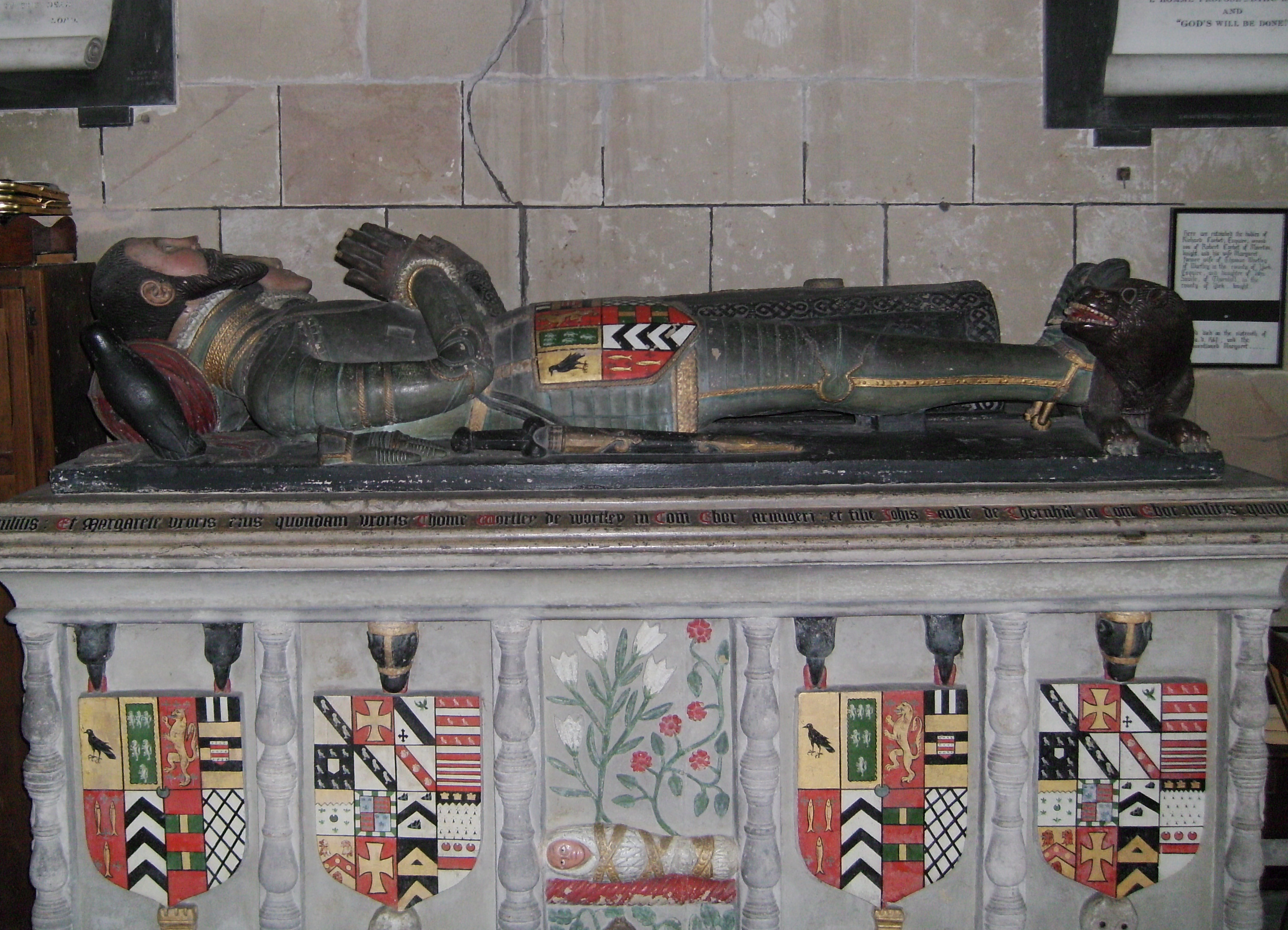
Tomb of Sir Richard Corbet and Margaret Corbet

The Church of England parish church of St Bartholomew is a grey stone church beside the castle. It has a Norman chancel, a later south aisle and an unusual trochoidal west window. There is good stained glass throughout – notably the large 19th-century east window, with its images of many children.

The church was patronised by the Corbet family and has an extraordinary Corbet family pew-room built into the south wall complete with a fireplace and carved seats on three sides. There is a number of monumental chest tombs of members of the family, such as that of Sir Richard Corbet (died 1566) and his wife Margaret. Some of the monuments depict the deceased's children: one portrays 18 children and another has a single baby in swaddling clothes with rose and lily. There are tablets to two Corbets who died in different wars; a large marble plaque on the west wall to Captain Robert Walter Corbet, 49th Regiment, who died of fever at Marseille in 1855 during the Crimean War, the epitaph quoting his recorded last words Homme propose - Dieu dispose ('Man proposes, God disposes'), and another on the south wall to Captain Sir Roland Corbet, 5th Baronet, Coldstream Guards, who was wounded in the Retreat from Mons and died in France in 1915, in World War I. The latter's sword used to be displayed beneath the tablet but has been removed.

There is a framed Roll of Honour listing 46 local men (including then Rector Edward Charles Pigot) who served in World War I, with indications of those killed, wounded or gassed in action or taken prisoner.

The churchyard has one war grave, that of a World War II Royal Air Force officer. Immediately outside the churchyard stands the parish's war memorial, a stone Celtic cross commemorating dead of both World Wars. Around its base is Earl Haig's quotation: "By the long road they trod with so much faith and with such devoted and self-sacrificing bravery we have arrived at victory and to-day they have their reward."

== See also ==
- Listed buildings in Moreton Corbet and Lee Brockhurst
