= Moreton Corbet and Lee Brockhurst =

Civil parish in Shropshire, England

Coordinates: 52.816°N 2.656°W

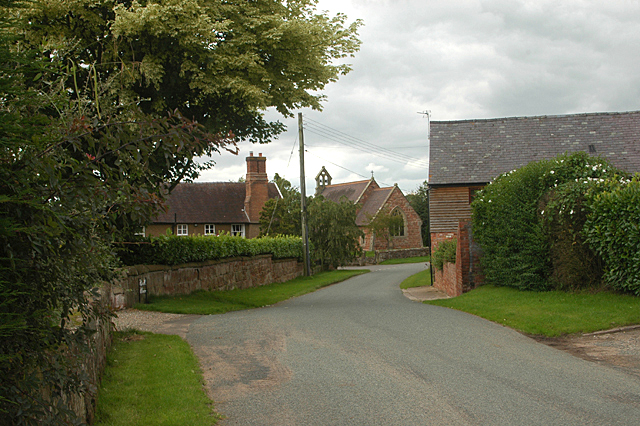
The small village of Lee Brockhurst.

Moreton Corbet and Lee Brockhurst is a civil parish in Shropshire, England.

It is the result of a merger of two older parishes - Moreton Corbet and Lee Brockhurst in 1988.

== See also ==
- Listed buildings in Moreton Corbet and Lee Brockhurst
