= Moreton Corbet Castle =

Ruined castle in Shropshire, England

- Shropshire, England
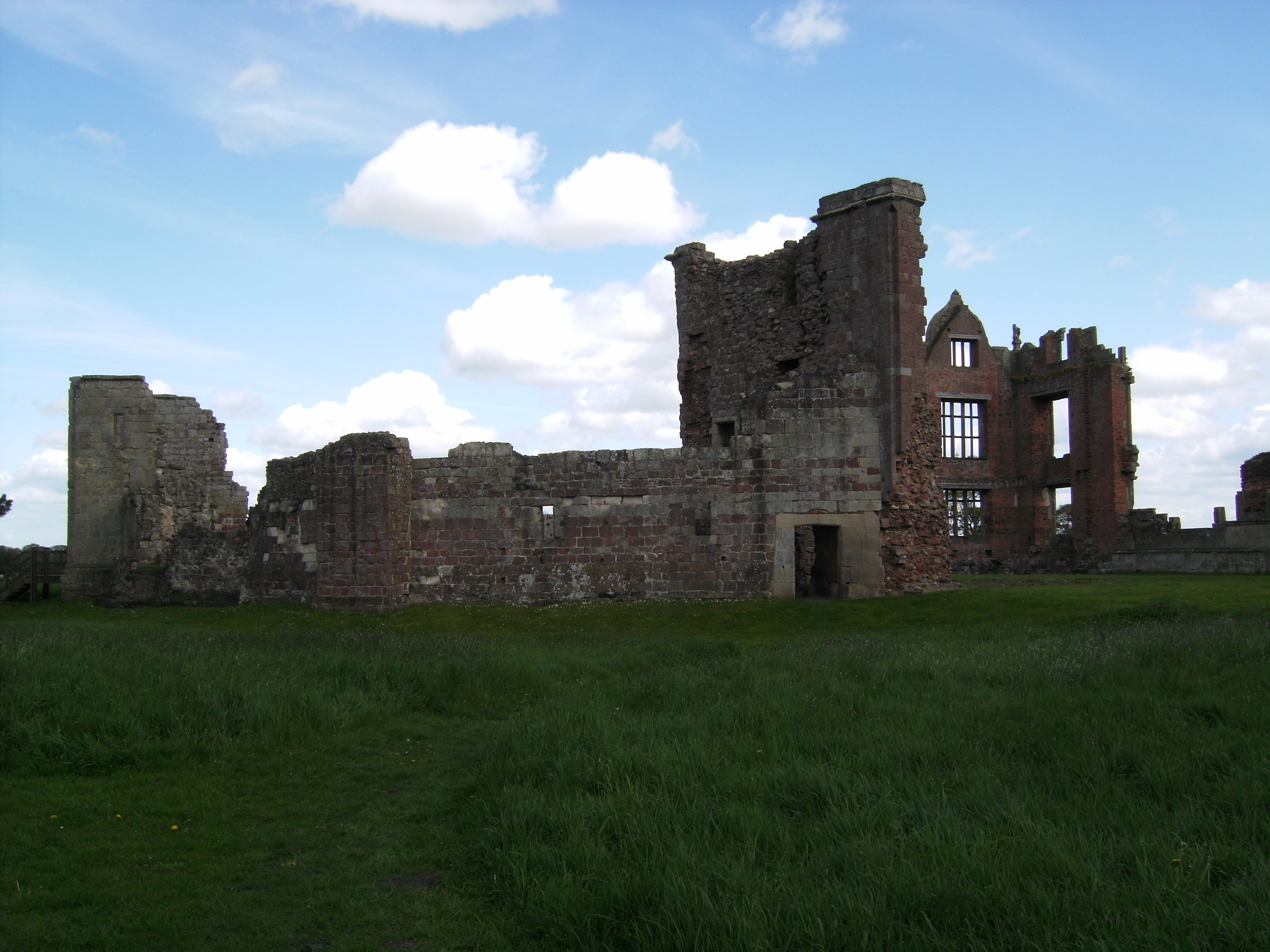
- View from the west

Site information
- Type: Castle
- Owner: English Heritage
- Condition: Ruined

Location
- Shown within Shropshire.
- Location within Shropshire
- Coordinates: 52.8045°N 2.6541°W
- Grid reference: grid reference SJ560232

Moreton Corbet Castle is a ruined medieval castle and Elizabethan era manor house, located near the village of Moreton Corbet, Shropshire, England. It is a Grade I listed building and English Heritage property. Although out of use since the 18th century, it remains the property of the Corbet family. It can be visited free of charge during daylight hours.

== History ==
=== Medieval stronghold ===
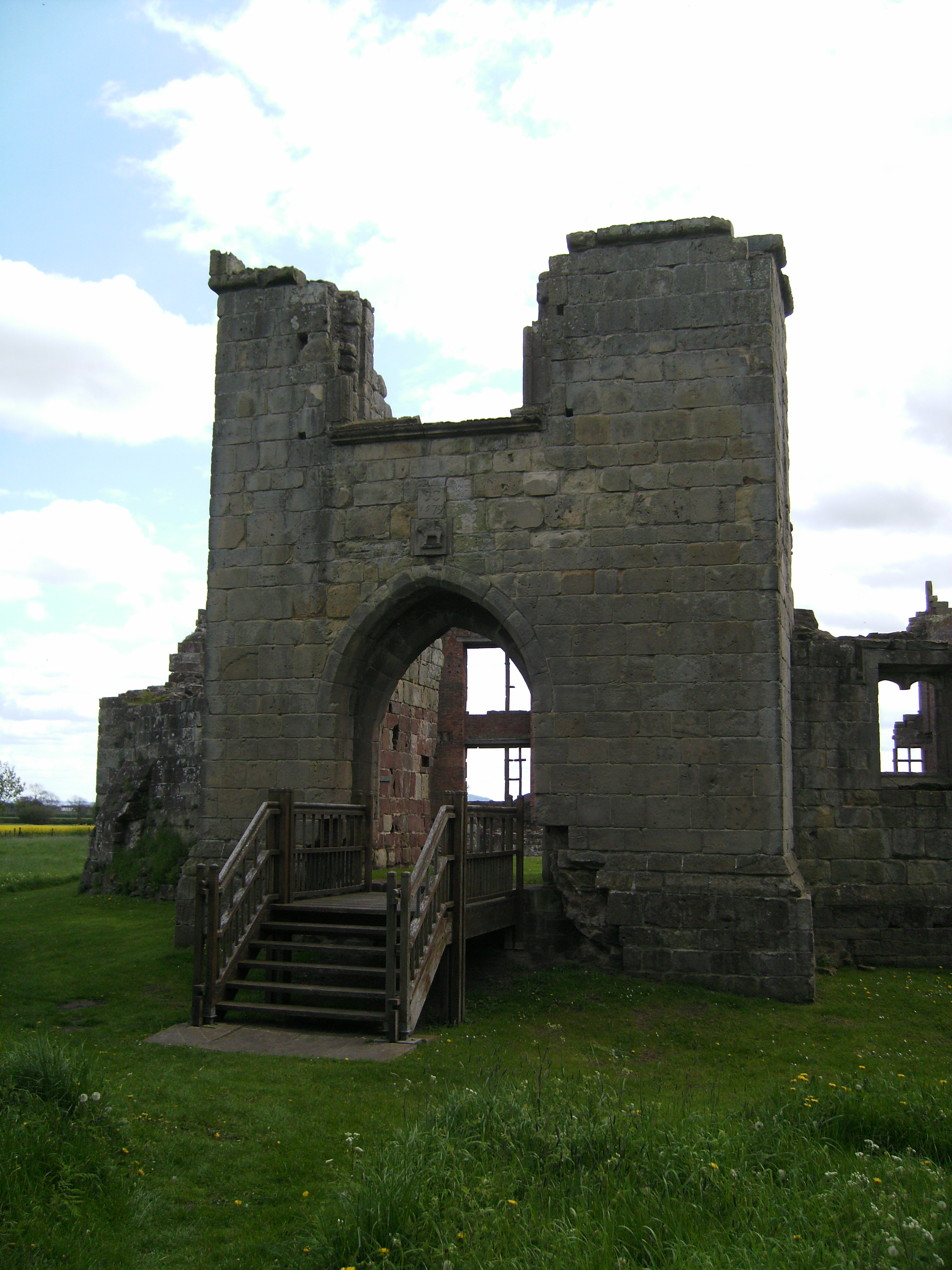
Medieval gatehouse with Elizabethan additions

In 1086 two Anglo Saxon thegns, Hunning and Wulfgeat, were living at Moreton Corbet. By the early thirteenth century the structure had been replaced by another, built by Toret, an Englishman. His descendant Peter Toret was lord of Moreton Corbet by 1166 and it is likely that he was living in the castle. In February 1216 William Marshall stormed Moreton Corbet castle on behalf of King John of England against Bartholomew Toret. At this time the castle was known as Moreton Toret Castle. In 1235 Bartholomew died and Richard de Corbet, his son-in-law, inherited the castle and changed its name to Moreton Corbet.

The keep or great tower to the west was connected to the gatehouse by a curtain wall, which then curved south and looped to encircle the site, creating a bailey or courtyard. The roof of the gatehouse has not survived, but the corbel work that supported the roof and tower battlements of the castle is still extant.

At the western end of the extant curtain wall is a rectangular keep of two stories and a basement, dating from between the eleventh and early thirteenth centuries. It was entered through an elevated doorway, and the fireplaces on the lower residential floor are still visible.

=== Elizabethan house ===
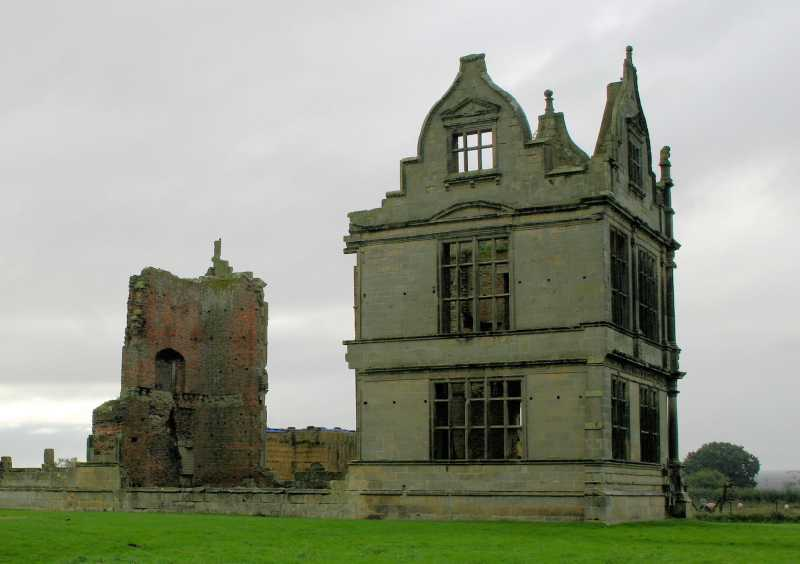
Elizabethan building with medieval keep behind

In the 16th century, Sir Andrew Corbet filled the courtyard to the east of the keep with a new house, stretching in a straight line to the south and west of the medieval structure. The perimeter wall to the west and south of the tower is now almost completely removed, leaving a gap between the castle and the later house.

Corbet adapted the medieval gatehouse with a gothic arch. In 1579, a year after Corbet had died, a carving of his monogram and the year were added, surmounting another rectangular stone bearing the family crest of an elephant and castle in relief.

Corbet had a large domestic range built against the curtain wall, with kitchens below and accommodation above. East and south of the gatehouse, the domestic ranges opened into a great hall. A large fireplace is apparent on the first floor, with a smaller one on the lower floor. Doorways were made through the curtain wall to the latrines. The keep was converted into a storehouse.

South of the castle, Corbet's son Robert had a wide but shallow house built in a more modern style, described by the noted antiquarian William Camden (1551–1623) as "a most gorgeous and stately house after the Italian model." It seems to have been influenced by the classical architecture of Italian buildings that he saw on his diplomatic travels, including Palladio's Basilica Palladiana in Vicenza. The building was faced with stone, but internally the walls were of brick. Although Italian in inspiration and elaborately decorated, much of the carving was of a rustic finish. After Robert Corbet died of the plague in 1583, his brothers Sir Richard and Vincent Corbet carried on with the building of the new manor, leaving what was left of the original fortification.

=== Civil War ===
During the English Civil War, Moreton Castle was used as part of Royalist Shrewsbury's defence. The castle was under siege on more than one occasion, and badly damaged in the fighting. The surviving ruins of the walls are pock-marked from musket shot. It was captured by a small Parliamentarian force in a night attack in September 1644, which deceived the Royalist garrison force into surrendering, believing the Parliamentarian force to be much larger.

== In legend ==
Sir Vincent Corbet, who was brother of Sir Richard who died in 1606, succeeded to the estate in the reign of James I, when Puritans were persecuted. Sir Vincent was not a Puritan but he disagreed with their persecution, so sheltered his Puritan neighbour, Paul Holmyard. As Puritan ideals become more fanatical, however, he felt he could no longer protect him and removed him from the castle. Holmyard managed to survive in the local woods for some time, eating whatever he could find, before venturing back out to Moreton Corbet. On meeting Sir Vincent he cursed the Corbet family, claiming they would never live in the castle's halls or finish repairing the building. The curse was fulfilled – at least insofar as Vincent and his son, Andrew, never lived at the house because they were so afraid. His ghost is said to haunt the grounds, stalking the empty walls to ensure the castle is not rebuilt.

== Gallery ==
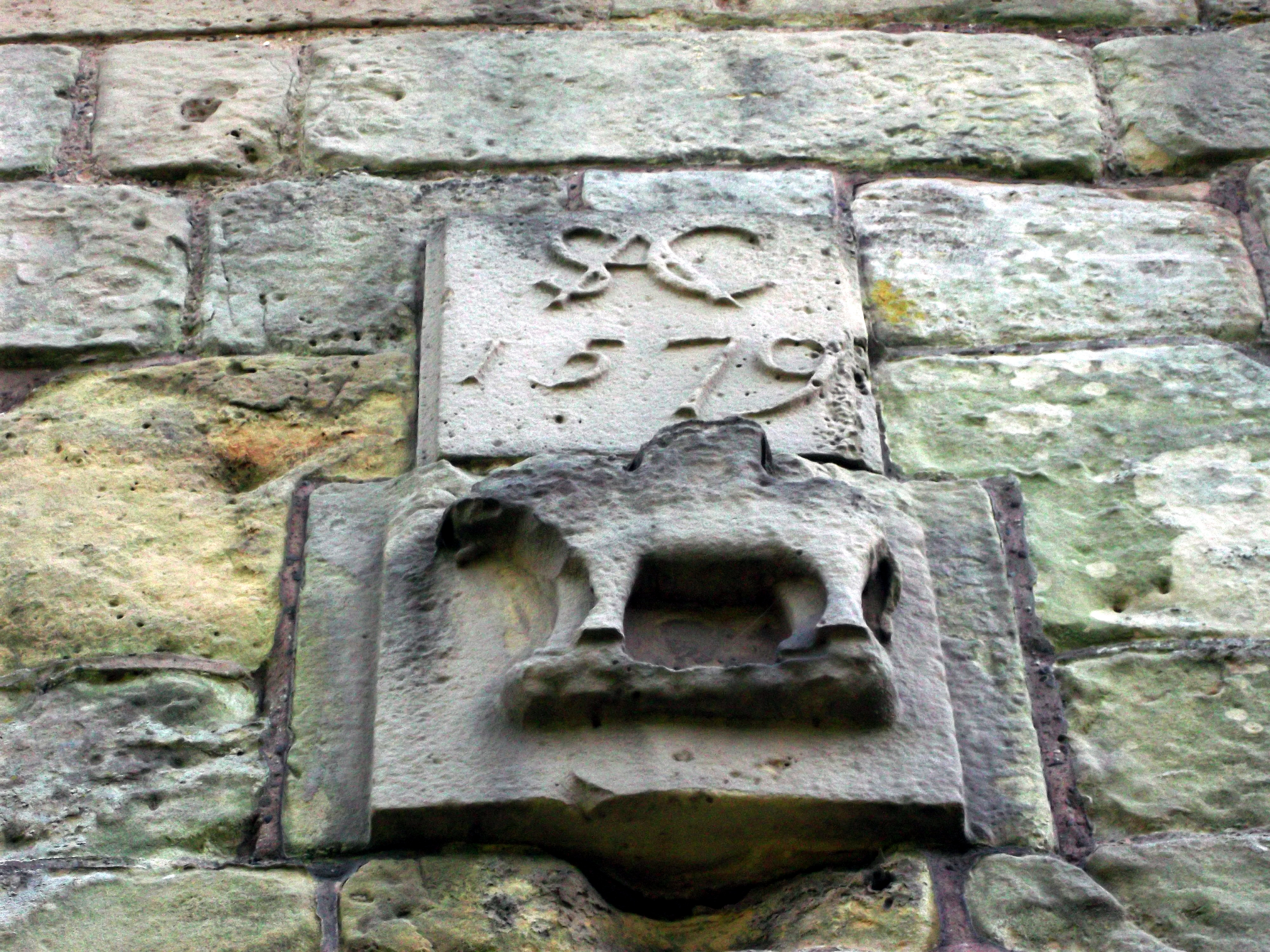
Insignia of Sir Andrew Corbet above gatehouse door

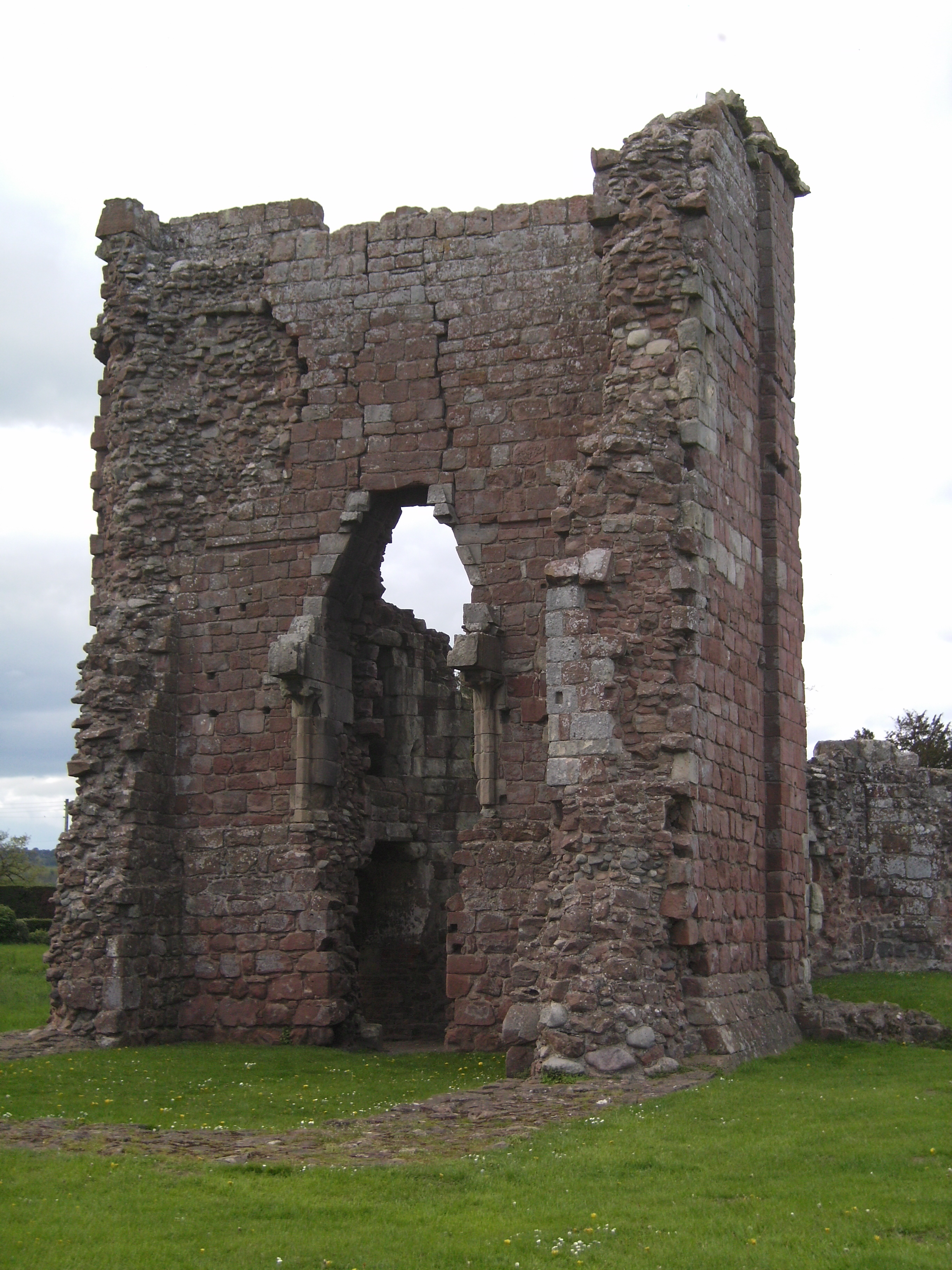
Remains of the great tower or keep

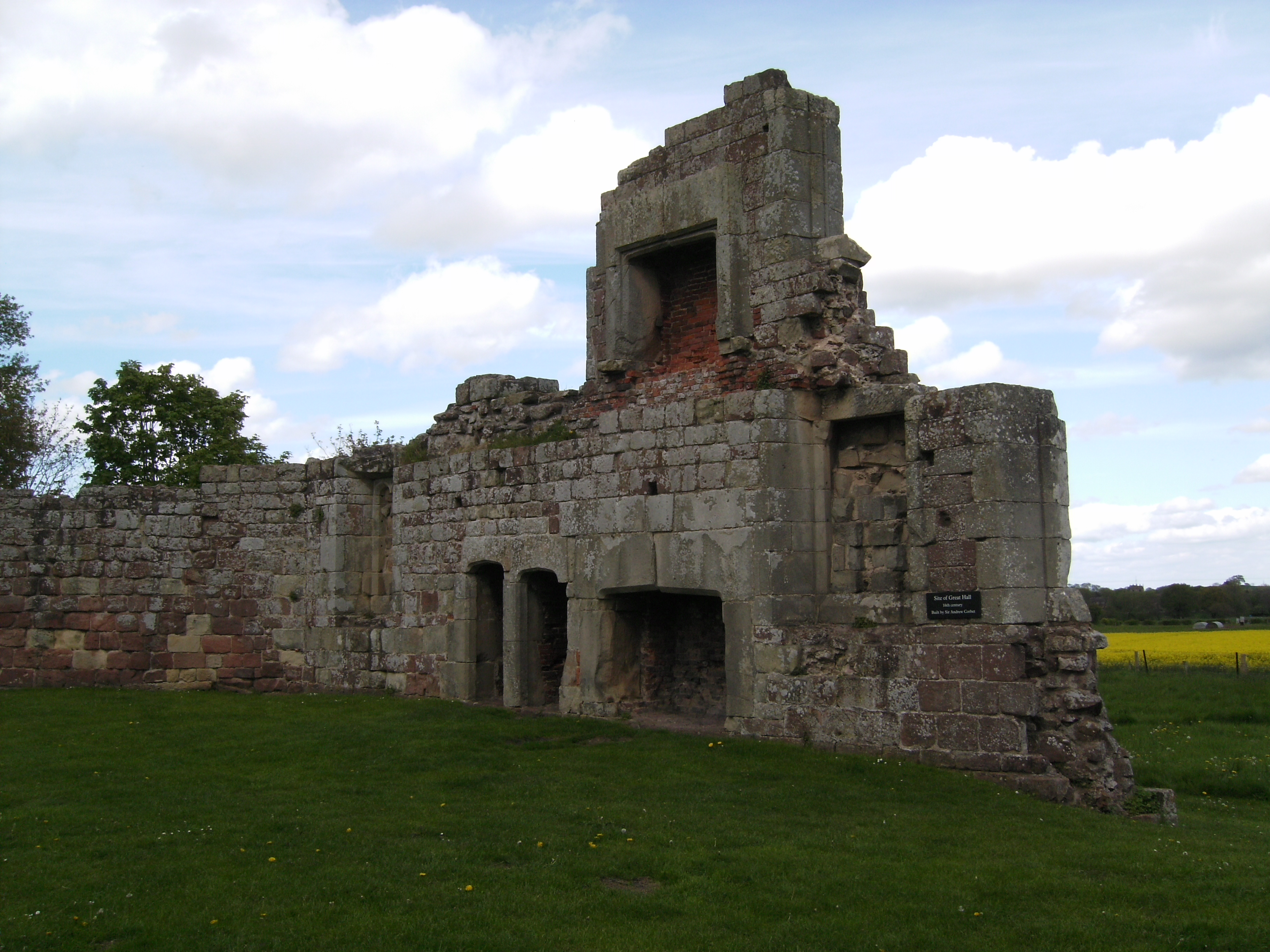
Great hall, showing fireplaces and doors to latrines

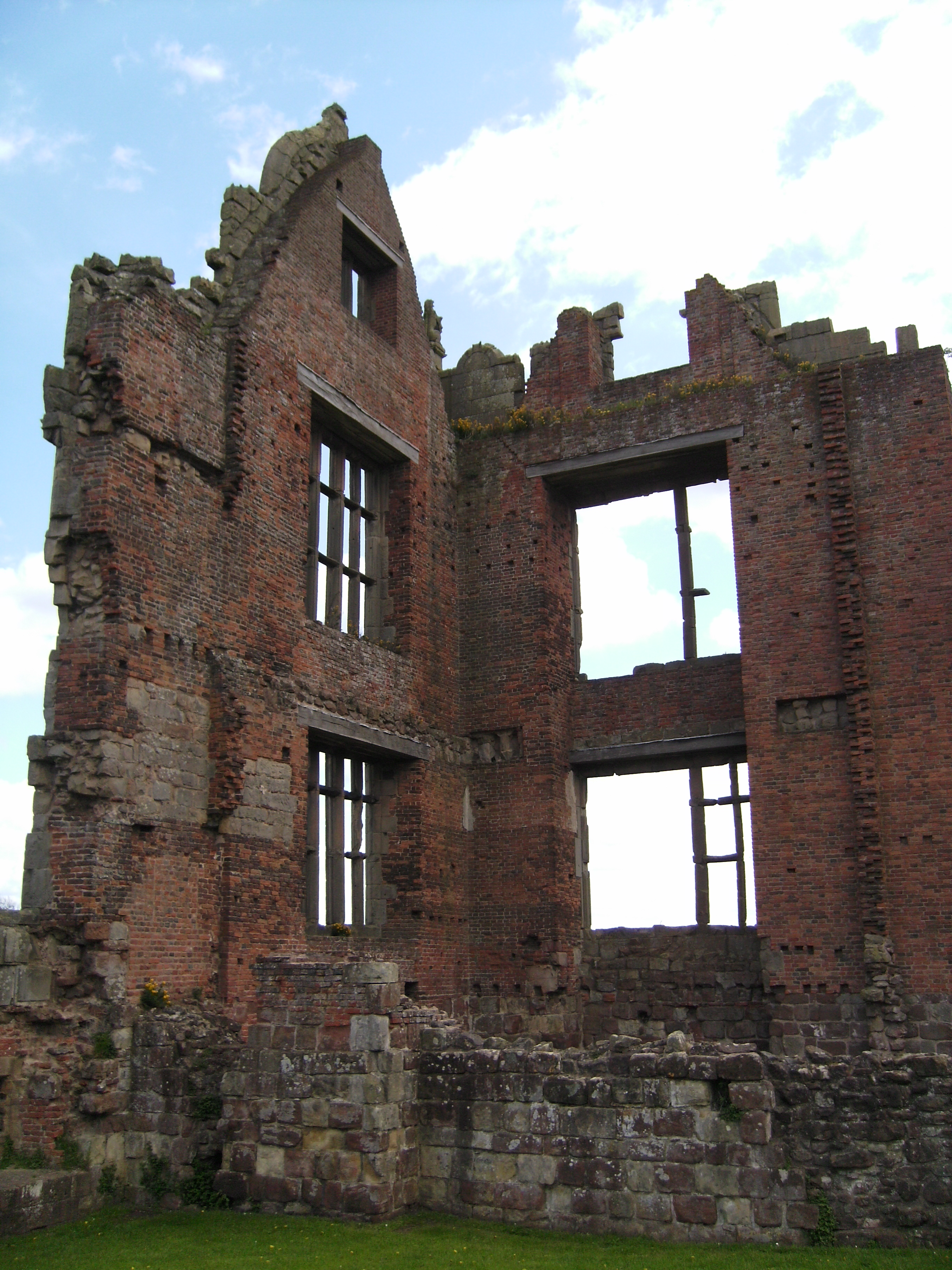
East end interior of Elizabethan house

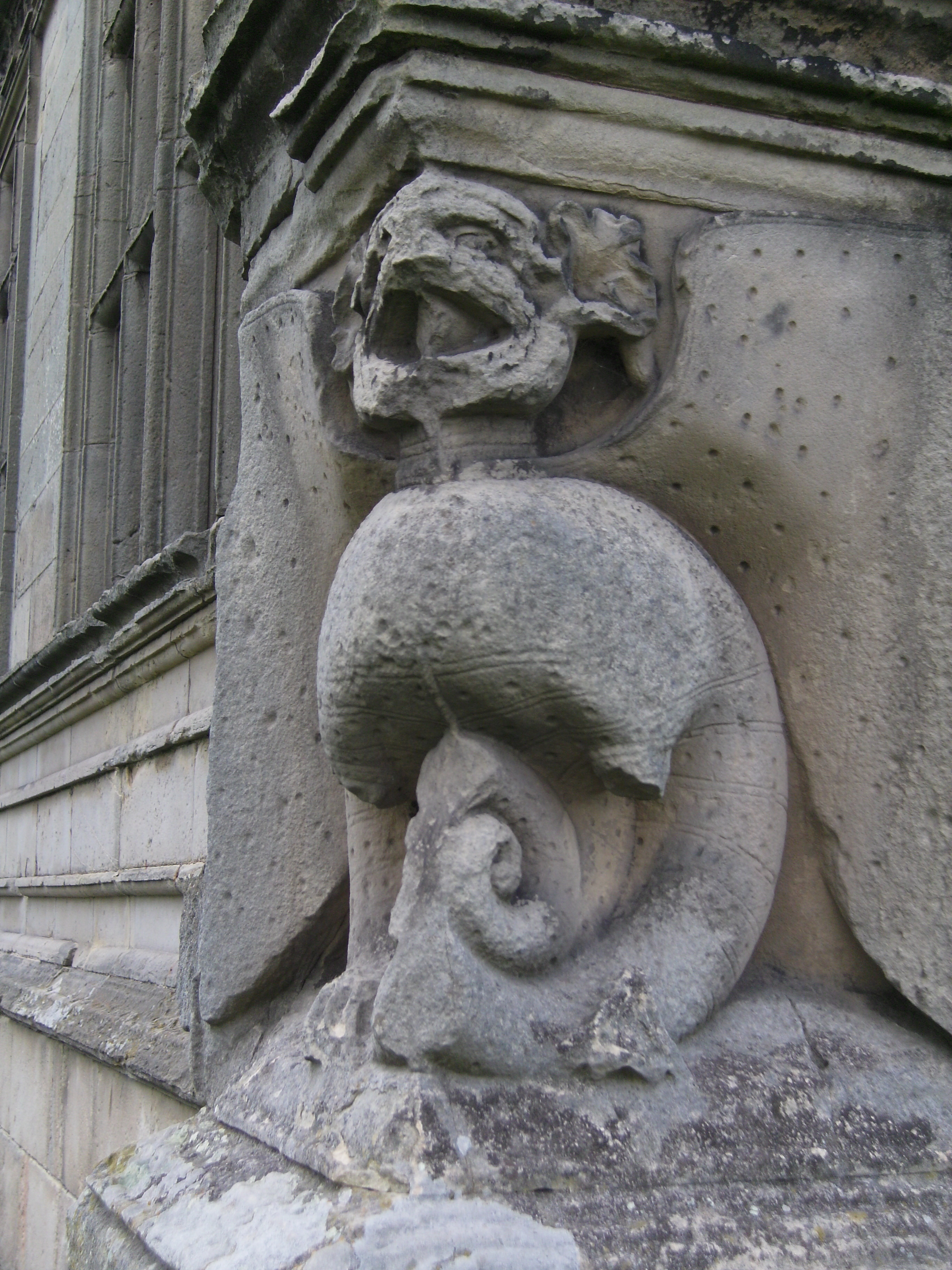
Chimera on west corner of Elizabethan frontage

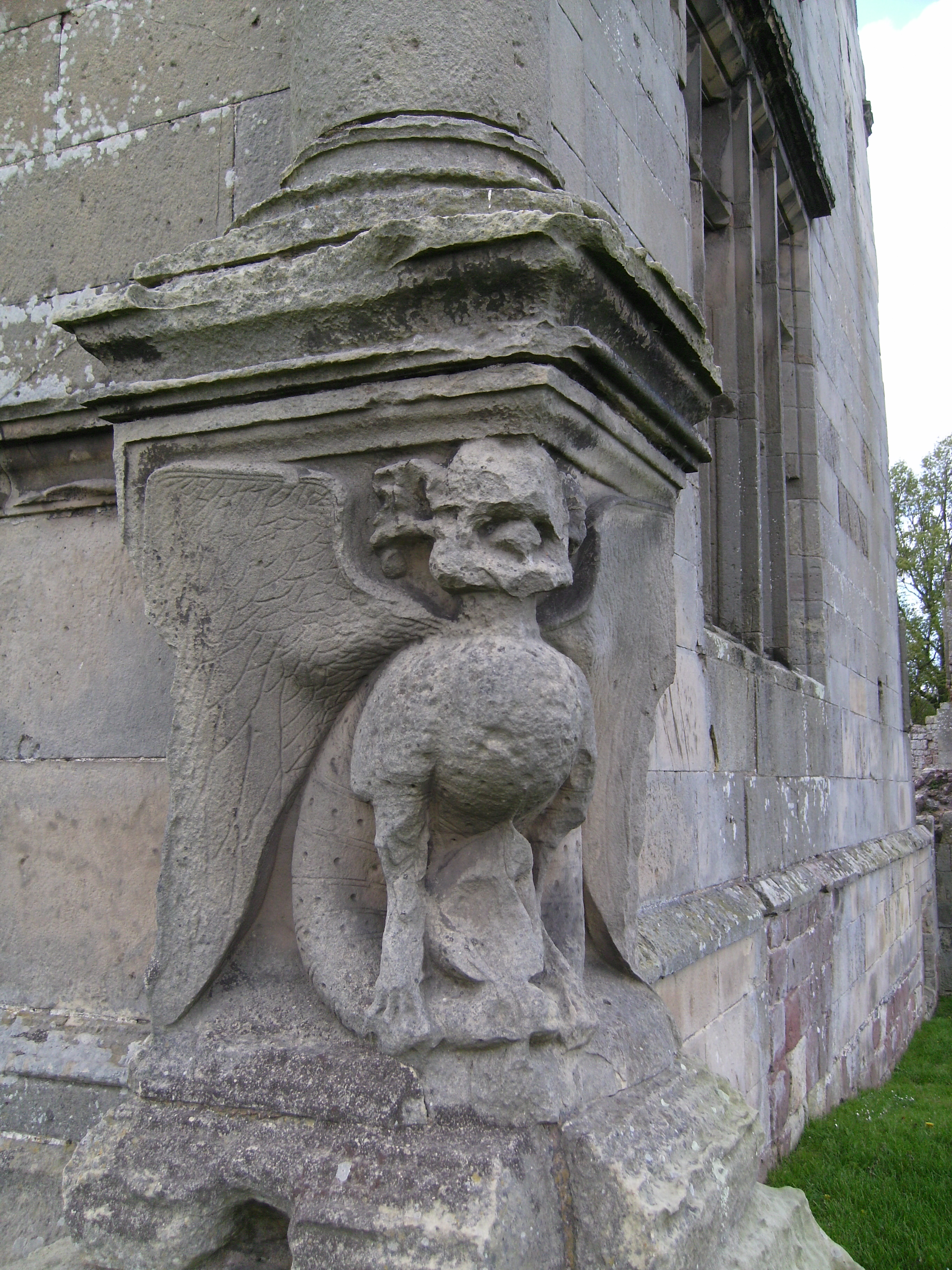
Wyvern on east corner of Elizabethan frontage

== See also ==
- Grade I listed buildings in Shropshire
- Listed buildings in Moreton Corbet and Lee Brockhurst
- Castles in Great Britain and Ireland
- List of castles in England
