= River Roden, Shropshire =

River in Shropshire, England

River Roden
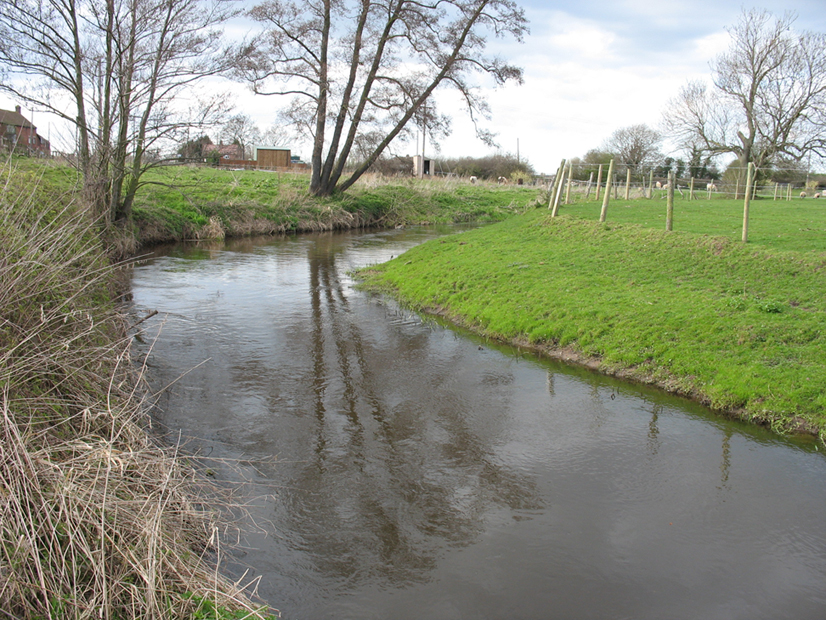

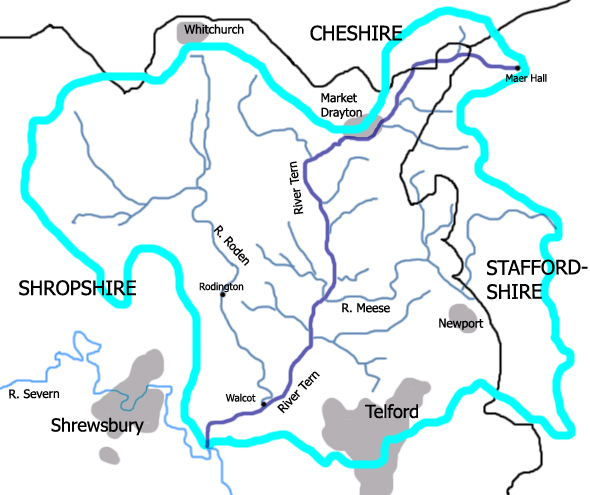
- A map of the Tern catchment, showing the Roden. Watershed is shown in cyan.

Location
- Country: England
- County: Shropshire
- District: Telford and Wrekin

Physical characteristics
- Source: Fenn's Moss
  - coordinates: 52.9305°N 2.7587°W
  - elevation: 90 m (300 ft)
- Mouth
  - location: Confluence with River Tern
  - coordinates: 52.7077°N 2.6035°W
  - elevation: 47 m (154 ft)
- Discharge
  - location: Rodington SJ 589 141
  - average: 1.94 m^{3}/s (69 cu ft/s)
  - maximum: 28.15 m^{3}/s (994 cu ft/s)1968-07-03

Basin features
- Tributaries
  - left: Soulton Brook
  - right: Sleap Brook

The River Roden is a river in Shropshire, England, which rises near Wem Moss where the Llangollen Canal passes above its headwaters. It flows southeast and meets the River Tern at Walcot.

Villages and towns it flows through or near to, include:

- Wem
- Aston
- Lee Brockhurst
- Shawbury
- Roden
- Rodington

== Wildlife ==
The River Roden is recognised for its abundance of wildlife. Predatory birds, foxes and other animals are common to this river and there is also a large variety of fish, including:

- Chub - which are largely sought by anglers in the river
- Pike - for which the river is known
- Barbel - which are unusual for a river like the Roden, although they do not grow to a large size here
- Dace - which are abundant in the river
- Perch
- Roach
- Minnow
