= Laver (surname) =

Laver is an English surname. Notable people with the surname include:

- Arnold Laver, British timber merchant
- Arthur Laver (1880–1965), South African cricket umpire
- Augustus Laver (1834–1898), Canadian architect
- Basil Laver (1894–1934), British surgeon
- Frank Laver (1869–1919), Australian cricketer and baseball player
- Jack Laver (1917–2017), Australian cricketer
- James Laver (1899–1975), English fashion historian, writer, and curator
- John Laver (1938–2020), British phonetician
- Les Laver (1900–1982), Australian rules footballer
- Richard Laver (1942–2012), American mathematician known for his work in set theory
- Rod Laver (born 1938), Australian tennis player
- Rudolph Laver (1872–1946), German-Australian electrical engineer

== See also ==
- Lavers, a surname
- Leaver
- Lever (surname)
