= Listed buildings in Much Wenlock =

Much Wenlock is a civil parish in Shropshire, England. It contains 104 listed buildings that are recorded in the National Heritage List for England. Of these, three are listed at Grade I, the highest of the three grades, six are at Grade II*, the middle grade, and the others are at Grade II, the lowest grade. The parish includes the town of Much Wenlock and the surrounding countryside which contains smaller settlements, including Bourton and Wyke. A high proportion of the listed buildings are in or near the centre of the town, and most are houses, cottages, shops, public houses, many of which are timber framed or have timber framed cores. The other listed buildings in the town include two wells, a church, the remains of a priory, and civic buildings. In the surrounding countryside are country houses and associated structures, farmhouses and farm buildings, a disused windmill, a war memorial, and another church.

== Key ==
Grade	Criteria
I	Buildings of exceptional interest, sometimes considered to be internationally important
II*	Particularly important buildings of more than special interest
II	Buildings of national importance and special interest

== Buildings ==
Name and location	Photograph	Date	Notes	Grade
St Owen's Well; 52.59643°N 2.55821°W	—	6th century	The site of an ancient spring is marked by an opening and an inscribed stone tablet in the wall of a house.	II
St Milburga's Well; 52.59564°N 2.55600°W	—	Medieval or before	The site of an ancient spring is marked by an opening with medieval moulding. In the wall above it is an inscribed panel.	II
Holy Trinity Church, Much Wenlock; 52.59647°N 2.55709°W		Early 12th century	The oldest part is the nave, the south aisle and chapel and the tower were added in the late 12th century, and the chancel was later extended, doubling its length. The church is built in stone, and consists of a nave, a south aisle and chapel, a south porch, a chancel, and a west tower. The nave is Norman in style, and the chancel is early Perpendicular. The tower has four stages, clasping buttresses, round-arched bell openings, and an embattled parapet.	I
Priory House; 52.59688°N 2.55479°W		Early 12th century	The house incorporates surviving parts of Wenlock Priory. There are two ranges at right angles. The northern range is the older, and consists of the former infirmary hall. The eastern range has been developed from the 15th-century prior's lodging, and contains two storeys of galleries, and a double spiral staircase in the angle. At the southwest angle is a portion of the 13th-century prior's hall.	I
Holy Trinity Church, Bourton; 52.56356°N 2.59568°W		12th century	The church was altered in the 18th century, and a large north aisle was added in 1844 when other changes were made. The church is in Neo-Norman style, it is built in sandstone and siltstone with dressings in freestone, and the roofs are tiled. It consists of a nave, a south porch, a north aisle, a lower and narrower chancel, and a north vestry. At the west end is a weatherboarded belfry with square louvred bell openings, a clock face on the west side, a pyramidal roof, and a weathervane. The round-headed north door dates from the late 12th century.	II*
Priory Tower; 52.59689°N 2.55679°W		13th century	Part of an entrance gatehouse to Wenlock Priory, it is in stone, and has a rectangular plan. On the east side is the line of a former gabled building that has been demolished. There are openings on the east and north fronts.	II
Wenlock Priory ruins 52.59714°N 2.55527°W		13th century	The main standing ruins of the priory are parts of the church, including the west front, parts of the south aisle, and of the north and the south transepts. The remains of the monastic buildings include parts of the chapter house, the library, the refectory, and an octagonal lavatorium. The priory ruins are also a Scheduled Monument.	I
14 High Street; 52.59524°N 2.55842°W		Late medieval (probable)	The oldest part is the massive stepped stone chimney breast on the right. The core of the building is timber framed, with modern brick alterations at the rear. It is stuccoed, and has a tile roof, two storeys, two bays, and a modern shop front.	II
55 and 56 High Street; 52.59540°N 2.55831°W		Early 15th century	Previously known as Raynald's Mansion, and since divided into two dwellings, it originated as a hall house, with the front added in the 17th century. The building is timber framed with plaster infill and some brick, and it has a tile roof. There are three storeys and three bays. Each bay contains a square two-storey bay window. Between the bays, in the middle floor are balconies, and in the ground floor are small 19th-century shop fronts. All the windows are 19th-century casements. In the top floor are three gables with carved bargeboards.	II*
5 and 6 Queen Street; 52.59641°N 2.55836°W		Early 15th century	A pair of timber framed cottages with cruck construction, formerly known as St Owen's Well House. They have a tile roof, two storeys, three bays, and casement windows. The left part is on a stone plinth, and has plaster infill, the right part has brick nogging, and there are exposed crucks in the gable ends.	II
16 and 17 High Street; 52.59500°N 2.55899°W	—	15th century (probable)	A pair of cottages with a timber framed core and cruck construction, encased in stone in the early 19th century. The roof is tiled, there are two storeys, doorways with plain surrounds, and casement windows. A cruck frame is exposed internally.	II
Ashfield Hall; 52.59501°N 2.55946°W		15th century	The left part is the older, it is in stone, and contains a round-headed arch. Above is a blocked window, into which has been partly inserted a gabled dormer containing a mullioned and transomed window. To the right is the lower part of a buttress. The right part was added in the early 17th century, the lower part is in stone, the upper part is timber framed with plaster infill, and it contains a gabled three-storey bay window. The right return is completely timber framed.	II*
55–57 Sheinton Street; 52.59720°N 2.55769°W		Late 15th century	A row of houses that were altered in the 16th century and since. The ground floor and the outer parts of the upper floor are in stone, and the central part of the upper floor is timber framed with plaster infill. There are two storeys, and in the upper floor are two eight-light mullioned and transomed windows with moulded surrounds. The ground floor has been altered, and includes an 18th-century moulded wooden doorcase. Incorporated in the east wall are two arches dating from about 1300.	II
6 Wyke; 52.61586°N 2.52231°W	—	Early 16th century	A timber framed house with a central cruck truss, on a stone plinth, and with a tile roof. There is one storey and an attic, and at the gable end is a large stone chimney breast. Originally a hall house, it was divided into two storeys in the 17th century, and the front was rebuilt in stone.	II
Guildhall; 52.59607°N 2.55719°W		c. 1540	The guildhall was extended in 1577, and again in 1868. It is timber framed with plaster infill, and the north end is in stone. The building consists of a single storey over an arcaded undercroft of seven bays. The upper storey is carried on oak arched braces supporting the bressumer. There are three gables, the right gable over a passageway added in 1868. Each gable contains a six-light mullioned and transomed window with a moulded surround.	II*
41 High Street; 52.59461°N 2.56114°W		16th century	A timber framed cottage with plaster infill and a tile roof. There are two storeys and two bays, and the windows are casements.	II
11 Bull Ring; 52.59657°N 2.55740°W		Late 16th century	A timber framed house with plaster infill, a tile roof, and two storeys with an attic. On the right is a projecting full-height angled bay with a hipped roof, containing a sash window. To the left is a doorway, casement windows, and a gabled dormer.	II
1 Wyke; 52.61553°N 2.52160°W	—	Late 16th century (probable)	A stone house with a tile roof, two storeys and an attic. The doorways and windows are modern.	II
Church House; 52.59567°N 2.55639°W		Late 16th century	The house is in brick in the lower part, timber framed with plaster infill above, and has a tile roof. There are two storeys and an attic. The lower floor protrudes under a pentice roof, and to the left is a gable with cusped bargeboards. The doorway has a plain surround, the windows are casements, and there is a gabled dormer.	II
7–10 Bull Ring; 52.59672°N 2.55705°W		c. 1600	A row of cottages, the oldest being No. 7, which is timber framed with plaster infill. The other cottages are in stone, the roof is tiled, and they have two storeys. The windows are modern casements.	II
21 and 22 High Street; 52.59484°N 2.55938°W	—	c. 1600	A pair of timber framed houses with plaster infill, tile roofs, one storey and attics. No. 21 has modern windows and a pair of gabled dormers. The ground floor of No. 22 is roughcast, the windows are casements, and there is one larger gabled dormer.	II
2 and 3 Victoria Road; 52.59457°N 2.56297°W		c. 1600	A pair of cottages on a stone plinth, with one storey and attics, tile roofs, casement windows, and two gabled dormers. The left cottage is timber framed with brick infill and the right cottage is roughcast. To the right is a former stone smithy that has two storeys, casement windows and an elliptical-headed cart entrance.	II
10 and 11 High Street; 52.59535°N 2.55812°W		Early 17th century (probable)	A pair of timber framed shops with tile roofs, two storeys, and shop fronts in the ground floor. No. 10 has plaster infill, three bays, and two four-light windows in the upper floor with a balcony between. No. 11 has brick infill, one bay, and a three-light window in the upper floor.	II
15 High Street; 52.59516°N 2.55867°W		Early 17th century	A shop, formerly an inn, then a bank, it is partly timber framed and partly in brick, with corbelled eaves, two storeys and an attic. At the rear it incorporates an early 15th-century aisled hall with cruck construction, now encased in brick. The doorway has a moulded surround, the windows are mullioned and transomed with moulded surrounds, and there are two dormers.	II
Bourton Hall Farm House; 52.56284°N 2.59858°W	—	Early 17th century	The farmhouse is in stone with a tile roof, and has two storeys and attics, and an irregular plan. On the front are two gables, the left larger, the windows are mullioned and transomed, and contain casements.	II
Dovecote, Bourton Hall Farm; 52.56301°N 2.59887°W	—	Early 17th century (probable)	The dovecote in the farmyard is in stone. It has a rectangular plan, and a simple wooden turret.	II
Bradley Farmhouse; 52.60895°N 2.54242°W	—	Early 17th century (probable)	The farmhouse was subsequently remodelled, altered and extended. Originally timber framed, it has been rebuilt in stone with a red brick right gable end and a tile roof. There are two storeys, an attic and a cellar, three bays, and a single-storey rear outshut. The windows on the front are mullioned, in the ground floor they also have reansoms, and elsewhere are casement windows. Inside are walls with exposed timber framing.	II
Talbot Inn and 12 High Street; 52.59529°N 2.55827°W		Early 17th century	The public house is timber framed with a stuccoed front dating from the 19th century. It has two storeys and three bays. In the ground floor are three adjacent windows and a carriageway to the left containing exposed timber framing, and in the upper floor are three modern casement windows. No. 12 to the left has two storeys, one bay, a shop front in the ground floor, and above is exposed timber framing above containing a three-light casement window.	II
The Woodhouse; 52.61751°N 2.53216°W	—	Early 17th century	A stone house, originally with two storeys and an attic. The attic gable was built as a dovecote, and has been converted for domestic use.	II
44 and 45 High Street; 52.59477°N 2.56035°W	—	17th century	Originally a timber framed malthouse, it was encased in brick in the early 19th century and converted into a shop and a house. It has dentil eaves, a tile roof, two storeys and seven bays, and there is exposed timber framing at the rear. The former gabled sack hoist breaks through the eaves, and a window has been inserted. The other windows vary, and the front includes a loft opening in the upper storey, a shop front, and two doorways, one with a small cornice hood.	II
34 Barrow Street; 52.59484°N 2.55527°W		1661	A timber framed cottage with plaster infill, a tile roof, and one storey with an attic. There is a central doorway, casement windows, and a dormer with a dated and initialled plate on the tie-beam.	II
The Manor House; 52.59789°N 2.55873°W		Late 17th century	The house has two storeys, a tile roof and an L-shaped plan. In the main range, the ground floor is in stone, and the upper floor is timber framed with brick infill. The rear range is in stone, with three bays, and a central doorway with a simple hood. All the windows are casements, those in the rear wing have segmental heads.	II
The Stone House; 52.61586°N 2.52167°W		Late 17th century	A large stone farmhouse, with a tile roof, two storeys, attics, a basement, and a front of three bays. There are two mullioned basement windows, the other windows are modern, and there is a dormer.	II
19 Sheinton Street; 52.59770°N 2.55851°W		Late 17th or early 18th century	The house has a timber framed core and was clad in stone in the 18th century. It has a stone slab roof, two storeys and three bays. The doorway has a plain surround, and the windows are casements, one set in a blocked arch.	II
Stable range, Bradley Farm; 52.60866°N 2.54200°W		Late 17th or early 18th century	The earliest part is in stone, the main part of the range added in the 18th century, and outshuts in the 19th century. The main part is in brick with tiles roofs, and the lean-tos have slate roofs. The range has corbelled eaves and two storeys, and includes an archway, a loft loading hatch, a window, a row of ventilation holes along the side, and in a diamond pattern in the gable end.	II
17 and 18 Barrow Street; 52.59576°N 2.55677°W	—	Early 18th century	A pair of brown brick shops with three storeys. Each shop has two bays and a late 19th-century shop front. Between the shop fronts is a passageway with a pointed arch. Above, the windows are sashes with channelled lintels and keyblocks. In the right return is a doorway with a moulded surround, a rectangular fanlight and a rustic porch.	II
19–21 Barrow Street; 52.59586°N 2.55695°W		Early 18th century	A row of three red brick shops with quoins, bands, a dentil cornice, and a parapet with brick coping. There are two storeys with attics, and seven bays. In the ground floor are shop fronts, the central one dating from the 19th century, and the outer ones later. Above are casement windows with keyblocks, and there are four gabled dormers.	II
23 Barrow Street; 52.59566°N 2.55685°W		Early 18th century	A brick shop with a tile roof, two storeys and three bays. In the upper storey are three mullioned and transomed windows, and in the ground floor are 19th-century shop windows, some mullioned.	II
57 and 58 High Street; 52.59548°N 2.55817°W	—	Early 18th century	A pair of red brick shops with pilasters at the sides, a band, and a tile roof. There are two storeys and an attic, and five bays. In the ground floor are shop fronts; No. 57 has a pentice roof, and No. 58 has a recessed door and a moulded cornice above it. The upper floor contains sash windows, and above there are four dormers.	II
59 and 60 High Street; 52.59553°N 2.55807°W	—	Early 18th century	A pair of shops in red brick on an earlier timber framed core, with three storeys and four bays. In the ground floor are shop fronts, and a door to a passageway that contains exposed timber framing. The windows are sashes.	II
Stable and cartshed range, Bradley Farm; 52.60911°N 2.54186°W	—	Early 18th century	The stable is the older part, with the cart shed added to the north in the 19th century. The building is in stone with the extension partly in brick, and it has tile roofs. It forms a rectangular plan, the cart shed having three bays, and there is an outshut on the west side with steps leading up to a loft. The stable has a loft door, a blocked window and a wide opening, and in the cart shed are three elliptical arches.	II
1 High Street; 52.59579°N 2.55733°W		18th century	A shop with probably a 16th-century core, it is in brick with stone at the rear, and has a band and a tile roof. There are two storeys and an attic, and three bays, and the windows are sashes. On the High Street front is a doorway with a plain surround and a shop front to the right, and in the gable end are more shop fronts.	II
48 High Street; 52.59495°N 2.55961°W	—	18th century	A stone house with a tile roof, two storeys and three bays. The doorway has a moulded surround and an open pediment. The windows are sashes in moulded surrounds, the window above the doorway being blocked. In front of the house are brick piers with stuccoed acorn heads.	II*
6 and 7 Smithfield Road; 52.59592°N 2.56092°W	—	18th century	A pair of cottages in stone, the front and gable end of No. 6 rebuilt or refaced in red brick. They have a tile roof and two storeys. The doorways have segmental heads, and the windows are casements.	II
2 and 3 Wilmore Street; 52.59620°N 2.55747°W	—	Mid 18th century	A pair of red brick shops with quoins, dentilled eaves and a tile roof. There are three storeys and four bays. In the ground floor are modern shop fronts, and above are sash windows with moulded surrounds, segmental heads and keyblocks.	II
Post Office; 52.59544°N 2.55794°W		Mid 18th century	The Post Office, which was altered later, is in red brick with rusticated brick quoins, moulded wooden eaves, and a tile roof. There are two storeys and an attic, and three bays. In the ground floor is a modern shop front, above are sash windows with moulded keyblocks, and three modern dormers.	II
The Old Windmill; 52.60390°N 2.55520°W		18th century	The disused windmill stands on a hill near Shadwell Rock Quarry. It is ruined and in stone, and consists of a tapering four-storey circular tower with a damaged embattled parapet.	II
29 Barrow Street; 52.59540°N 2.55628°W		Late 18th century	A brick house with a tile roof and a central gable, two storeys and an attic, and two bays. In the centre is a doorway with a moulded surround flanked by bow windows, all under a moulded wooden cornice with a central pediment. The other windows are casements.	II
26–32 High Street; 52.59470°N 2.55987°W		Late 18th century	A row of seven stone cottages with dentilled eaves, two storeys and tile roofs. Steps lead up to some of the doorways, and the windows vary.	II
63 High Street; 52.59571°N 2.55775°W		Late 18th century (probable)	A stone shop with a tile roof, two storeys and two bays. In the ground floor is a 19th-century shop front, and in the upper floor are sash windows.	II
Railings, gate piers and gates, Mardol Cottage; 52.59606°N 2.55985°W	—	Late 18th century	The wrought iron railings are at the front of the garden of the cottage. On each side are gate piers, one in rusticated and the other restored in brick, and both have moulded cornice caps and acorn heads. In the centre are wrought iron gates.	II
The Old Vicarage; 52.59425°N 2.56175°W	—	Late 18th century	A red brick house, with a hipped roof, three storeys, and three bays. The doorway has a moulded surround, a segmental fanlight, and an open pediment, and the windows are sashes. In front are wrought iron gates and railings.	II
The Red House; 52.59897°N 2.55841°W		Late 18th century	A red brick house with pilasters at the sides, moulded eaves, and a tile roof with coped gables. There are three storeys and a symmetrical front of three bays. The central doorway has a moulded surround with pilasters, a radial fanlight and an open pediment. In the outer bays of the lower two floors are Venetian windows, and the windows in the middle bay have round heads.	II
Barn, Bradley Farm; 52.60885°N 2.54204°W	—	1783	The barn and stables are in red brick with a tile roof. The building has six bays, the barn occupying five of the bays. It contains a large cart entrance, loft doors, rows of ventilation holes, and pigeon holes in various patterns.	II
11 Barrow Street; 52.59503°N 2.55531°W	—	c. 1800	A stuccoed house with a tile roof, three storeys and two bays. The doorway to the left has a moulded surround, with pilasters, a segmental fanlight, and an open pediment. The windows are sashes with channelled lintels.	II
12 Barrow Street; 52.59512°N 2.55542°W		c. 1800	A red brick house with a tile roof, three storeys and four bays. The doorway has a moulded surround and an open pediment, and the windows are sashes with channelled lintels and keyblocks.	II
1 Bourton Road; 52.59363°N 2.56200°W	—	c. 1800	A brick house with a tile roof, two storeys and an attic. On the front is a porch flanked by bay windows, square on the left, and canted and larger on the right. The windows are casements, there is a lunette in the upper floor, and two gabled eaves dormers.	II
40 High Street; 52.59458°N 2.56132°W	—	c. 1800	A stuccoed house with pilasters at the sides and between the bays, and a hipped tile roof. There are two storeys and three bays, the outer bays containing two-storey canted bay windows with moulded surrounds. Steps lead up to the central round-headed doorway that has a semicircular fanlight, and above it is a sash window.	II
42 and 43 High Street; 52.59466°N 2.56071°W		c. 1800	A pair of brick houses with a tile roof and two storeys. In the ground floor are two doorways with moulded surrounds, another doorway that is blocked and has an inserted window, two bow windows, and other replacement windows, and in the upper floor are six original casement windows.	II
47 High Street; 52.59490°N 2.55971°W	—	c. 1800	A brick house with a tile roof, two storeys and two bays. In the ground floor is a central doorway with a moulded surround flanked by bow windows, all under a wooden moulded cornice. In the upper floor is a casement window with a channelled lintel and a keyblock.	II
Gaskell Arms Hotel; 52.59441°N 2.56088°W		c. 1800	Originally a coaching inn, the hotel is in red brick with dentil eaves, and the left return is stuccoed. There are two storeys, a symmetrical front of five bays, with a later pilastered wing on the right. The outer bays contain two-storey canted bay windows with domed roofs, and the windows are sashes. The doorway has a moulded surround, a segmental head and a traceried fanlight.	II*
Raven Hotel; 52.59527°N 2.55609°W		c. 1800	The hotel is stuccoed, and has three storeys, three bays, and a single-storey wing on the left. There are two doorways with moulded surrounds, one on the left, and the other in the centre that has a moulded canopy with a small balcony. The windows are sashes, and there is a wrought iron inn sign.	II
Bourton Manor; 52.56392°N 2.59471°W	—	Before 1819	A country house that originated as a house in limestone in Tudor style. Parts of it were incorporated when the much larger house by Norman Shaw was built in 1874. The north front of the original house with two unequal gables and mullioned and transomed windows has been retained. The rest of the house is in red brick with half-timbering, a tile-hung upper storey, tile roofs, an irregular plan, many gables, bay windows, and tall chimney stacks.	II
51–54 Sheinton Street; 52.59730°N 2.55778°W		c. 1819	A row of four brick cottages with a tile roof, originally almshouses. There is one storey and attics, and each cottage has one bay. The doorways and ground floor windows have ogee heads, and each cottage has a gabled dormer; all the windows are casements.	II
Tickwood Hall; 52.62077°N 2.52854°W		Mid 1820s	A country house in red brick with slate roofs, that was extended on a number of occasions by the addition of wings to the west. The main block has two storeys, four bays, dentilled eaves and a hipped roof. The entrance has a stone portico with four Ionic columns and a moulded cornice, and the doorway has a moulded architrave. The windows are sashes with channelled lintels. The wing immediately to the left contains a bow window.	II
7 and 8 Barrow Street; 52.59494°N 2.55511°W		Early 19th century	A pair of roughcast cottages, probably with an 18th-century core. They have bands, a tile roof, two storeys and attics, and each cottage has one bay. The doorways have pilasters and gabled hood, the windows are casements with segmental heads, and there are two gabled dormers.	II
9 Barrow Street; 52.59499°N 2.55522°W		Early 19th century	A stuccoed house with dentilled eaves and a tile roof. There are two storeys and two bays. The doorway has pilasters and a cornice hood on brackets, to its left is a passageway, and the windows are casements.	II
13 and 14 Barrow Street; 52.59532°N 2.55578°W	—	Early 19th century	A pair of red brick houses with dentil eaves cornices and tile roofs. No. 13 has two storeys, No. 14 has two storeys and an attic, and both houses have two bays. The windows are sashes with channelled lintels and keystones. The doorways are similar, and each has convex steps, a moulded surround, fluted pilasters, and a cornice hood on consoles.	II
22 Barrow Street; 52.59595°N 2.55709°W		Early 19th century	A red brick shop with dentilled eaves, a tile roof, three storeys and three bays. In the ground floor is a 19th-century shop front, and above the windows are sashes.	II
24 Barrow Street; 52.59559°N 2.55672°W	—	Early 19th century	The house, which probably has an 18th-century core, is in brick with dentilled eaves and a tile roof. There are two storeys and two bays. The doorway has a moulded surround and a gabled hood. To its right is a square bay window, and the other windows are mullioned and transomed casements.	II
Outbuilding at rear of 24 Barrow Street; 52.59551°N 2.55694°W	—	Early 19th century	The outbuilding is partly timber framed, with some brick and some rendered wattle and daub infill, it is partly in red brick, and partly in stone, with some weatherboarding, and it has a tile roof. There are two storeys and a cellar, and three bays. The building contains casement windows, doorways, and steps leading down to the cellar.	II
25 and 26 Barrow Street; 52.59551°N 2.55660°W		Early 19th century	A pair of cottages in stone and brick with an earlier timber framed core with cruck construction, and a tile roof. They have one storey and attics, modern doors and windows, and three gabled dormers. To the right the ground floor of No. 25 protrudes, and beyond that is a gabled wing with two storeys and an attic.	II
27 and 28 Barrow Street; 52.59543°N 2.55645°W		Early 19th century	A pair of cottages in stone and brick with an earlier timber framed core with cruck construction, a tile roof, and two storeys. In the ground floor are two canted bay windows flanked by plain doorways. The upper floor contains three modern casement windows.	II
3 and 4 High Street; 52.59562°N 2.55761°W		Early 19th century	A pair of shops in chequered blue and buff brick, with corbelled eaves and a tile roof. There are three storeys and four bays. In the ground floor are late 19th-century shop fronts, and above are sash windows with plain lintels and keyblocks.	II
5 High Street; 52.59558°N 2.55766°W		Early 19th century	A brick shop with corbelled eaves and a tile roof. There are three storeys and two bays. In the ground floor is a 19th-century shop front, and above are sash windows with segmental heads.	II
6 High Street; 52.59554°N 2.55772°W		Early 19th century	A red brick shop with dentilled eaves and a tile roof. There are three storeys and two bays. In the ground floor is a 19th-century shop front, and above are sash windows with flat brick arches.	II
23 High Street; 52.59478°N 2.55951°W	—	Early 19th century	A brown brick house with the gable end facing the street. It has two storeys and an attic, one bay, a doorway with a plain surround, and casement windows.	II
24 and 25 High Street; 52.59476°N 2.55961°W	—	Early 19th century	A pair of stuccoed stone cottages with a tile roof. They have two storeys and one bay each. In the ground floor each cottage has a doorway with a plain surround to the left, and a canted mullioned and transomed bay window to the right, and in the upper floor is a mullioned and transomed window.	II
33 and 34 High Street; 52.59454°N 2.56032°W	—	Early 19th century	The houses are in brown brick with dentilled eaves and a tile roof. There are two storeys and four bays. On the front is a box bay window, a canted bay window, three doorways, and casement windows.	II
53 and 54 High Street; 52.59533°N 2.55848°W		Early 19th century	A pair of stuccoed shops with an earlier timber framed core, a tile roof, one storey and attics. The doorways have plain surrounds, and No. 54 has a shop front with a moulded doorcase under a moulded cornice. There are four gabled dormers, one cutting through the eaves.	II
61 High Street; 52.59557°N 2.55798°W		Early 19th century	A shop, stuccoed on earlier fabric, with three storeys and two bays. In the ground floor is a modern shop front, in the upper floors are sash windows, and between the windows in the middle floor is a decorative panel with initials and the date 1693.	II
3 St Mary's Lane; 52.59466°N 2.55648°W	—	Early 19th century	A stone house with brick dressings, a tile roof, one storey and an attic. The gable in the front and the eaves have a corbelled and dentilled verge. The windows are casements in brick surrounds with pointed heads.	II
5 St Mary's Lane; 52.59444°N 2.55705°W		Early 19th century	The house is in painted brick and stone with corner pilasters, a tile roof with a shaped gable, and two storeys. The doorway and flanking small windows have pointed heads, and are contained under a moulded cornice like an open pediment. The other windows also have pointed heads.	II
1–5 Sheinton Street; 52.59691°N 2.55776°W		Early 19th century	A row of brick houses, No. 5 stuccoed, with corbelled eaves, and tile roofs. They have two storeys, the windows are sashes, some of which are blocked, and there are four gabled dormers. Above three of the doorways are gabled hoods, and No. 5 has a late 19th-century shop front.	II
24 Sheinton Street; 52.59872°N 2.55926°W	—	Early 19th century	A brown brick house with a tile roof. There are two storeys and a symmetrical front of three bays, Steps lead up to the central doorway that has a moulded surround, pilasters and a cornice hood. The windows are sashes with channelled lintels and keyblocks.	II
50 Sheinton Street; 52.59746°N 2.55793°W		Early 19th century	A red brick house with an earlier timber framed core and a tile roof. There is one storey and an attic, and two bays facing the street. In the ground floor are two casement windows, and above is a window with a pointed head and Gothick glazing. There is exposed timber framing in the gable ends.	II
58 and 59 Sheinton Street; 52.59704°N 2.55761°W	—	Early 19th century	A shop and a house in brick with dentilled eaves and a tile roof. The shop on the left has two storeys and two bays, a 19th-century shop front on the ground floor and casement windows above. The house has two storeys and an attic, and one bay. The doorway has a moulded surround with pilasters and a small hood. The casement windows in the lower two floors have moulded segmental heads.	II
1 Smithfield Road; 52.59476°N 2.56078°W		Early 19th century	A small stone cottage with an earlier core probably from the 17th century. It has a tile roof, one storey, and two bays. There is a central doorway, two casement windows with cambered heads, and a massive stepped stone chimney breast on the right with a tall brick stack.	II
4 Wilmore Street; 52.59628°N 2.55750°W		Early 19th century	A red brick house on a stone plinth with a tile roof, three storeys and two bays. The doorway is approached by steps and has a moulded surround with pilasters, joined to an adjacent window on the right under a moulded cornice, and there is a similar window further to the right. To the left is a doorway to passageway with a semicircular fanlight. The windows are sashes, those in the middle floor with stepped lintels and keyblocks.	II
6 Wilmore Street; 52.59638°N 2.55757°W		Early 19th century	A red brick shop with a tile roof, three storeys and two bays. In the ground floor is a modern shop front, the middle floor contains sash windows with segmental moulded stone lintels and keyblocks, and in the top floor are casement windows.	II
Burford House; 52.59663°N 2.55768°W	—	Early 19th century	The house, at one time the Stork Inn, is stuccoed, with bands, bold lined eaves, and a tile roof. It has two storeys and a symmetrical front of three bays. Steps with railings lead up to the doorway that has pilasters, an entablature, and a cornice. The windows are sashes with plain architraves.	II
Fox Hotel; 52.59485°N 2.56003°W	—	Early 19th century	A stuccoed public house with a dentilled eaves and a tile roof. There are two storeys and an attic, two bays, and a lower right ring. Steps from each side lead up to a central open gabled porch and a doorway with a moulded surround. The windows in the main block are sashes with stepped lintels and keyblocks.	II
George and Dragon Inn; 52.59571°N 2.55745°W		Early 19th century	The public house is in brick with a tile roof. There are two storeys, the lower storey slightly projecting, and three bays. The doorway has a plain surround, in the ground floor the windows are sashes, and above they are casements.	II
Priory Cottage; 52.59700°N 2.55691°W		Early 19th century	A stone house with an earlier timber framed core, quoins on all corners, and a tile roof. There are two storeys and an attic, and a front of three bays. The outer bays project forward, and all the bays are gabled and have ornamental bargeboards. The windows are mullioned and transomed.	II
The Priory; 52.59719°N 2.55672°W	—	Early 19th century	A stuccoed house with parapets and a tile roof. There are two storeys, an irregular plan, and a front of six bays, three of the projecting and gabled with scalloped bargeboards. Most of the windows are sashes with stepped lintels, and others are casements.	II
School House; 52.59676°N 2.55738°W	—	1829	A brown brick house, at one time a bank, it has a tile roof, two storeys, a symmetrical front of three bays, and a rear two-bay wing. The central doorway has a moulded surround, pilasters, a segmental fanlight and an open pediment. Above it is a dated plaque and an inscribed sill. The windows are sashes with moulded segmental lintels and keyblocks.	II
2 Bourton Road; 52.59353°N 2.56220°W	—	c. 1830	A red brick house with a moulded cornice, a pyramidal roof, three storeys and sides of two bays. The windows are sashes, those in the middle floor with moulded lintels. The main doorway is in the middle floor. It is approached by steps flanked by railings and piers with ball finials. The doorway has a moulded surround, a fanlight, and an open pediment. There is a smaller doorway to the bottom floor to the right; it is smaller and has a moulded surround.	II
Lodge, Tickwood Hall; 52.61734°N 2.52390°W		c. 1830	The lodge at the entrance to the drive of the hall is in brick with a hipped slate roof, and has one storey. In the centre is an open-fronted porch with two plain columns and a recessed doorway. This is flanked by windows with Gothick tracery and hood moulds.	II
18–20 High Street; 52.59492°N 2.55918°W	—	19th century	A row of four stone cottages of unequal size, with probably a 17th-century timber framed core. They have two storeys, a tile roof, casement windows, and three of the doorways have segmental heads.	II
5 Wilmore Street; 52.59634°N 2.55753°W		Mid 19th century	A red brick shop with quoins, bands, and a tile roof. There are two storeys and an attic, and three bays. In the ground floor is a modern shop front, the upper floor contains sash windows with keyblocks, the centre one scrolled, and above is a modern box dormer.	II
County Library; 52.59565°N 2.55788°W		1852	The building, designed by S. Pountney Smith, originated as the Corn Hall and Agricultural Library, and has later been used as a public library. It is in stone with quoins, a moulded band, an eaves cornice, and a tile roof with parapeted gables. There are two storeys and four bays. The ground floor is an open loggia with an arcade of four arches. In the upper storey are sash windows with rusticated surrounds and small cornices. In the centre of the upper floor is a moulded cartouche above an inscribed marble tablet.	II
The Police Station; 52.59693°N 2.55756°W		1865	The police station is in black brick on a plinth with quoins, bands, a bracketed eaves cornice and a slate roof. There are two storeys and three bays. The central doorway has a pointed head and a fanlight, and the windows also have pointed heads.	II
Lodge, Bourton Manor; 52.56428°N 2.59622°W	—	c. 1874	The lodge at the entrance to the drive was designed by Norman Shaw. It is in brick and stone, and has a tile roof, two storeys, and gables with bargeboards. The windows are mullioned, and there is a wooden porch with a room extending above it.	II
Bourton War Memorial; 52.56371°N 2.59571°W	—	1921	The war memorial is in the churchyard of Holy Trinity Church. It is in stone and consists of a Latin cross on a low, square plinth and an octagonal base. Resting against the cross is a carved wreath with an inscription.	II
