= Laver =

Laver may refer to:

- A basin for ritual purification
  - Lavatorium, a washing facility in a monastery
- Green laver, a type of edible green seaweed used in East Asian cuisine
- Laver (surname), a list of people with the name
- Laver (ghost town), a settlement in Sweden
- Laver Bariu (1929–2014), Albanian folk clarinetist and singer
- Porphyra, red laver species
  - Porphyra umbilicalis, a species of edible seaweed traditionally used to make laverbread
- River Laver, a river in North Yorkshire, England
- Laver Cup, an international indoor hard court men's team tennis tournament

== See also ==
- Leaver, a surname
- Lever (disambiguation)
