= Roast lamb with laver sauce =

Welsh lamb dish

- Alternative names: Roast lamb with laverbread
- Course: Main course
- Place of origin: Wales
- Region or state: Wales
- Main ingredients: Lamb, laverbread, butter, citrus juice

Roast lamb with laver sauce is a dish from Welsh cuisine that pairs roasted lamb with a sauce made from laverbread (a purée of cooked laver seaweed), typically enriched with butter and citrus juice. A recipe for the dish appears in the food writer Jane Grigson's English Food (1974), one of the standard reference works on British regional and traditional cooking.

== Background ==
Lamb and mutton dishes are widespread throughout Wales, and Welsh lamb has held Protected Geographical Indication (PGI) status since 2003, meaning it must come from lambs born and reared in Wales.

Laverbread, made by boiling laver seaweed to a purée, has a long history in Welsh cooking, particularly around Swansea and the Gower Peninsula; besides its traditional use alongside bacon and cockles at breakfast, it can also be made into a sauce served with meat or fish.

One regional lamb associated with South Wales is Gower Salt Marsh Lamb, raised on the salt marshes of the Gower Peninsula and granted Protected Designation of Origin (PDO) status in 2021.

== See also ==
- Portal:Food
- List of lamb dishes
- Laverbread
