= Leaver =

Leaver or Leavers may refer to:

- Leaver, a supporter of Brexit
- Surname
  - Brett Leaver (born 1970), New Zealand field hockey player
  - Charles Owen Leaver Riley (1854–1929), first Anglican archbishop of Perth, Western Australia
  - Christopher Leaver (born 1937), British businessman who served as Sheriff and Lord Mayor of the City of London
  - Chris J. Leaver (born 1942), British biochemist
  - Derek Leaver (footballer) (1930–2013), English footballer
  - Derek Leaver (chemist) (1929–1990), British scientist
  - Don Leaver (1929–2015), British television producer
  - Henrietta Leaver (1916–1993), Miss America in 1935
  - Huggy Leaver (real name Hugh Leaver), British actor
  - Jason Leaver Canadian creator of the Out with Dad LGBT web series
  - Jimmy Leaver (1898–1959), English professional footballer
  - John Busuttil Leaver (born 1964), Maltese artist
  - Lois Leaver (born 2002), British slalom canoeist
  - Marcus Leaver (born 1970), British publishing executive
  - Noel Leaver (1889–1951), English painter and teacher
  - Peter Leaver (born 1944), English barrister and football administrator
- Leavers machine, lacemaking machine invented by John Levers [sic] in 1813
- Leavers week or schoolies week, Australian high-school graduates' first week of holidays
- The Leavers, 2016 novel by Lisa Ko
- Leavers, a term used in Ishmael to refer to members of non-civilized societies

== See also ==
- Lever (disambiguation)
- Rudi Leavor (1926–2021) German-born British Jewish community leader
- Laver (disambiguation)
