= Lever (surname) =

Lever is a surname. Notable people with the surname include:

- Sir Arthur Lever, 1st Baronet (1860–1924), British politician
- Arthur Lever (footballer) (1920–2004), Welsh professional footballer and Wales international
- Asbury Francis Lever (1875–1940), member of the United States House of Representatives from South Carolina
- Sir Ashton Lever (1729–1788), English collector of natural objects
- Caitlin Lever (born 1985), Canadian softball player
- Charles Lever (1806–1872), Irish novelist of English descent
- Colin Lever (born 1939), English former cricketer
- Darcy Lever (c.1759–1839), British author and expert in seamanship
- Don Lever (born 1952), Canadian retired professional ice hockey left winger
- Eddie Lever, manager of English football club Portsmouth F.C. 1952–1958
- Lafayette "Fat" Lever (born 1960), American retired professional basketball player
- Sir Hardman Lever, 1st Baronet (1869–1947), English accountant and civil servant
- Harold Lever, Baron Lever of Manchester (1914–1995), English barrister and politician
- Harry Lever (1886–1970), Australian rules footballer who played with St Kilda in the VFL
- Hayley Lever (1876–1958), Australian-American painter, etcher, lecturer and art teacher
- Henry W. Lever (1883–1980), American sportsperson and educator, head football coach at Carroll College
- Jake Lever (born 1996), player for the Melbourne Demons in the Australian Football League
- James Darcy Lever (1854–1910), English co-founder of Lever Brothers
- Janet Lever (born 1946), American professor of sociology
- John Orrell Lever (1824–1897), English shipping owner and politician
- John Lever (born 1949), English former cricketer
- Johnny Lever (born 1957), Indian film actor and comedian
- Laurie Lever (born 1947), English-Australian Olympic-level equestrian rider
- Leslie Lever, Baron Lever (1905–1977), British politician
- Mark Lever (born 1970), English professional footballer
- Sir Paul Lever (born 1944), British retired ambassador
- Peter Lever (1940–2025), English cricketer
- Philip Lever, 3rd Viscount Leverhulme (1915–2000), British landowner and race-horse owner
- Steven Lever (born 1963), Founder of Levertech Engineering Services Ltd
- Thomas Lever (or Leaver, Leiver) (1521–1577), English Protestant reformer and Marian exile
- Tim Lever, member of British pop group Dead or Alive 1983–89
- William Lever, 1st Viscount Leverhulme (1851–1925), English industrialist, philanthropist and politician; the primary founder of Lever Brothers
- William Lever, 2nd Viscount Leverhulme (1888–1949), English industrialist and philanthropist
- Yves Lever (1942–2020), Canadian film critic and historian

== See also ==
- Laver (surname)
- Leaver
