= Sheinton Street =

Prominent street in Much Wenlock, England

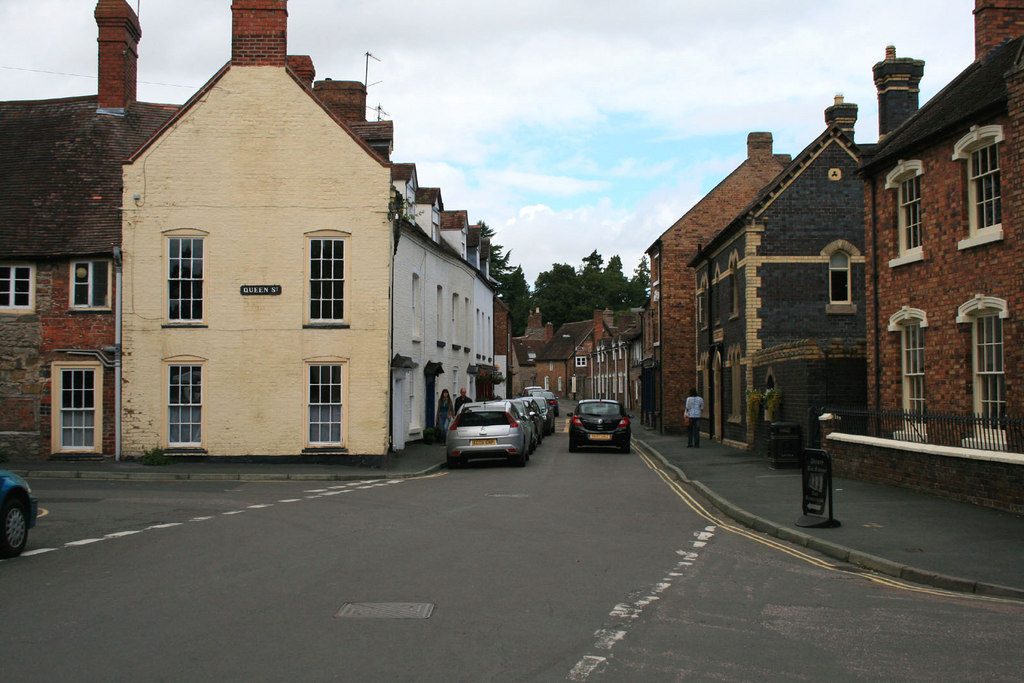
- A 2010 view from Bull Ring, looking north
- Interactive map of Sheinton Street
- Length: 0.12 mi (0.19 km)
- Location: Much Wenlock, Shropshire, England
- South end: Wilmore Street
- North end: New Road

Sheinton Street is a street in the market town of Much Wenlock, Shropshire, England. It runs for about 0.12 miles (0.19 km), from Wilmore Street in the south to New Road (the A4169) in the north.

== Notable locations ==
The street contains several Grade II listed buildings, with the oldest (numbers 55–57) dating to the late 15th century:

- 1–5 Sheinton Street
- 19 Sheinton Street
- 24 Sheinton Street
- 50 Sheinton Street
- 51–54 Sheinton Street
- 55–57 Sheinton Street
- 58–59 Sheinton Street

== In popular culture ==
In an episode of Time Team, filmed in April 1993, host Tony Robinson and Professor Mick Aston climbed to the top of Holy Trinity Church. From their vantage point, they could see north down Sheinton Street and northeast along the Bull Ring, which leads to Wenlock Abbey. In response to Robinson's observation that there was a clear boundary between the end of the gardens on Sheinton Street and the fields behind, Aston replied:

It's because of the difference in ownership. A boundary is fixed, with an owner on each side, and really that can't be altered until someone owns both sides. If that never happens, then that boundary remains. Very often, and this is a very good example, the oldest things in a town are not the buildings or the church or any of the other things that you think are obvious; they're actually the lines that were drawn on the ground by the original guy laying the place out. I think that's fantastic — that a line can remain that long.

Robinson mentioned this exchange during a eulogy of Aston in 2020.

They later took to a helicopter for an aerial view of the town, including a view south down Sheinton Street. Aston explained that the larger plots of land are on the eastern side of the street, given that the properties are not constricted by the town behind it as are those properties on the opposite of the street.
