= Welbeck Publishing Group =

UK book publishing company

- Founded: 2019
- Founders: Mark Smith & Marcus Leaver
- Country of origin: United Kingdom
- Headquarters location: London, W1
- Distribution: HarperCollins (UK), Sterling Publishing (US)
- Publication types: Books
- Imprints: Welbeck, Welbeck Children's, Flame, Balance, Mountain Leopard Press, Orange Hippo!
- Official website: welbeckpublishing.com

Welbeck Publishing Group, formerly Carlton Publishing Group, is a London-based independent book publisher of fiction, narrative and illustrated non-fiction, as well as gift and children's books. Established in 2019 by Executive Directors Mark Smith and Marcus Leaver, the business specialises in commercial publishing in 30 languages and in more than 60 countries around the world, across all genres and categories.

Welbeck's imprints include Welbeck (Fiction and Non-Fiction), Balance (Lifestyle and MBS), Orange Hippo! (gifts), Welbeck Children's, Flame (Middle-Grade Fiction) and Mountain Leopard Press (Literary and Translations).

Notable authors include Paul McKenna, Jessie Cave, Linda Calvey, Ruby Wax, Freya North, Dr Hilary Jones and Simon Thomas.

In 2022, Hachette UK acquired Welbeck Publishing Group.
