= 34 Barrow Street =

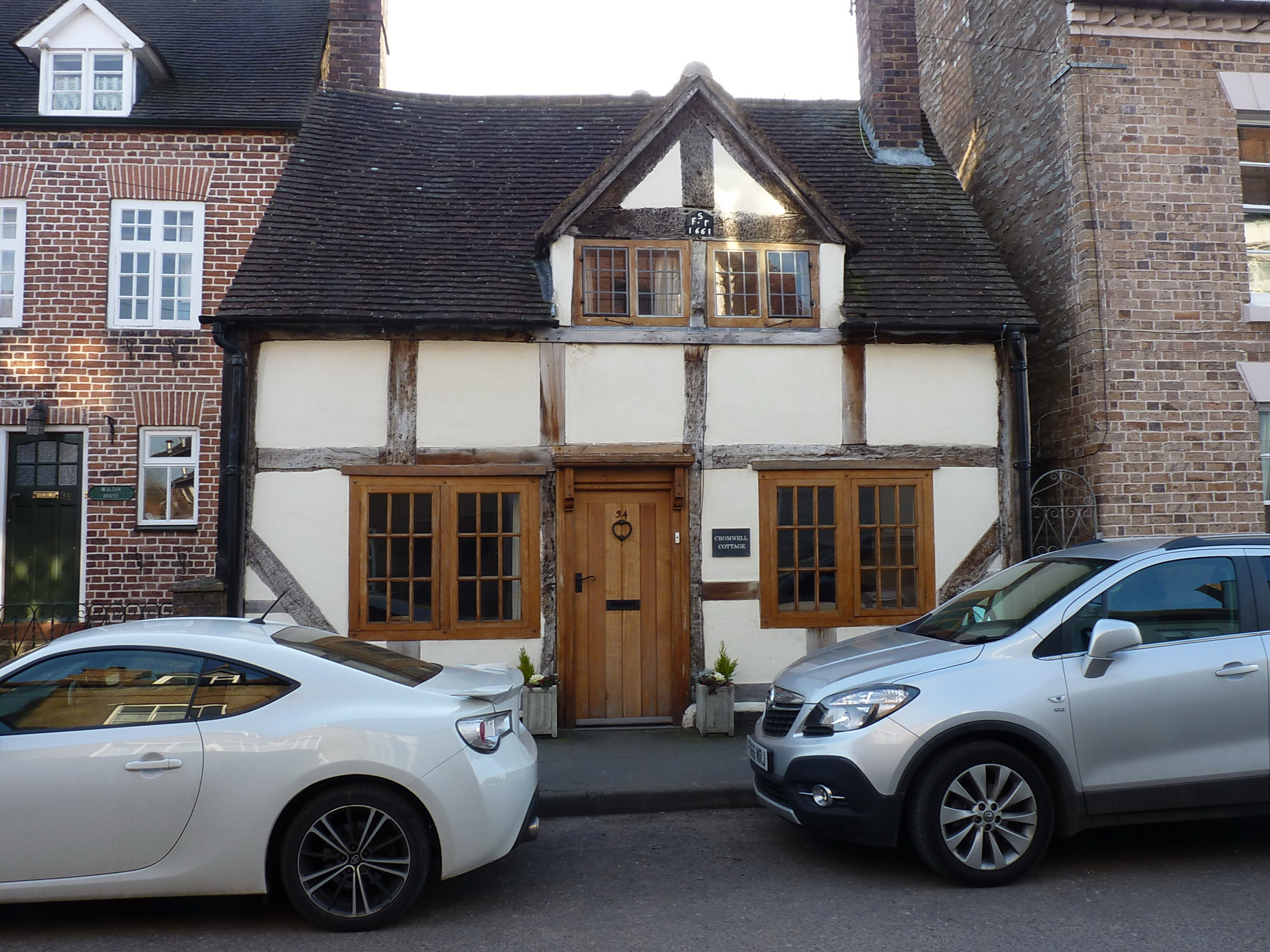
- The building in 2018

- Location within Shropshire Location within England
- 52.59484°N 2.55527°W
- Location: Much Wenlock, Shropshire, England

History
- Built: 1661 (365 years ago)

Listed Building – Grade II
- Designated: 1 February 1974
- Reference no.: 1053849

34 Barrow Street is a historic building in Much Wenlock, Shropshire, England. Dating to 1661, it is now a Grade II listed building.

It is a timber framed cottage with plaster infill, a tile roof and one storey with an attic. There is a central doorway, casement windows and a dormer with a dated and initialled plate on the tie-beam.

== See also ==
- Listed buildings in Much Wenlock

== Sources ==
- Historic England, "No. 34 Barrow Street, Much Wenlock (1053849)", National Heritage List for England
- Newman, John; Pevsner, Nikolaus (2006), Shropshire, The Buildings of England, New Haven and London: Yale University Press, ISBN 0-300-12083-4
