= Leverage =

Leverage or leveraged may refer to:

- Leverage (mechanics), mechanical advantage achieved by using a lever
- Leverage (album), a 2012 album by Lyriel
- Leverage (dance), a type of dance connection
- Leverage (finance), using given resources to magnify a financial outcome
- Leverage (football), a personal foul in American football
- Leverage (negotiation), the ability to influence another side in negotiations
- Leverage (statistics), a concept in regression analysis

== Television ==
- Leverage (American TV series), a 2008–2012 American comedy-drama crime television series
  - Leverage: The Roleplaying Game, based on the series
  - Leverage: Redemption, a 2021 revival of the American series
- Leverage (South Korean TV series), a 2019 South Korean television series
- "Leverage", Episode 18 of mermaid drama Siren

== See also ==
- Leveraged buyout, using debt to gain control of a company's equity
- Lever (disambiguation)
