= Wyke, Shropshire =

Hamlet in Shropshire, England

Coordinates: 52.616°N 2.522°W

Wyke
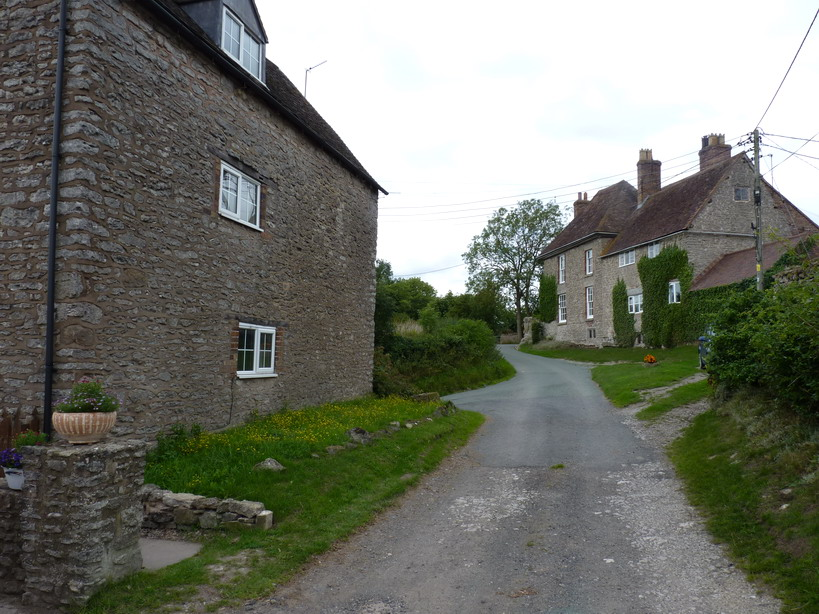
- Wyke, Shropshire

- Location within Shropshire
- OS grid reference: SJ646021
- Civil parish: Much Wenlock
- Unitary authority: Shropshire
- Ceremonial county: Shropshire
- Region: West Midlands
- Country: England
- Sovereign state: United Kingdom
- Post town: MUCH WENLOCK
- Postcode district: TF13
- Dialling code: 01952
- Police: West Mercia
- Fire: Shropshire
- Ambulance: West Midlands
- UK Parliament: Ludlow

Wyke (or the Wyke) is a small hamlet in rural Shropshire, England, where it is part of the civil parish of Much Wenlock. Its name may originate from Old English wice, Wych elm, but is more likely derived from the word wic, dwelling or village.

It was one of the old townships of Much Wenlock parish, where it was treated as a single township with the neighbouring township of Bradley (having a total of eight taxpayers in 1524). From the late 18th century the small settlement at Wyke was eclipsed by new cottages built at Farley to the south-west.

== See also ==
- Listed buildings in Much Wenlock
