= The Quarto Group =

Illustrated book publishing group

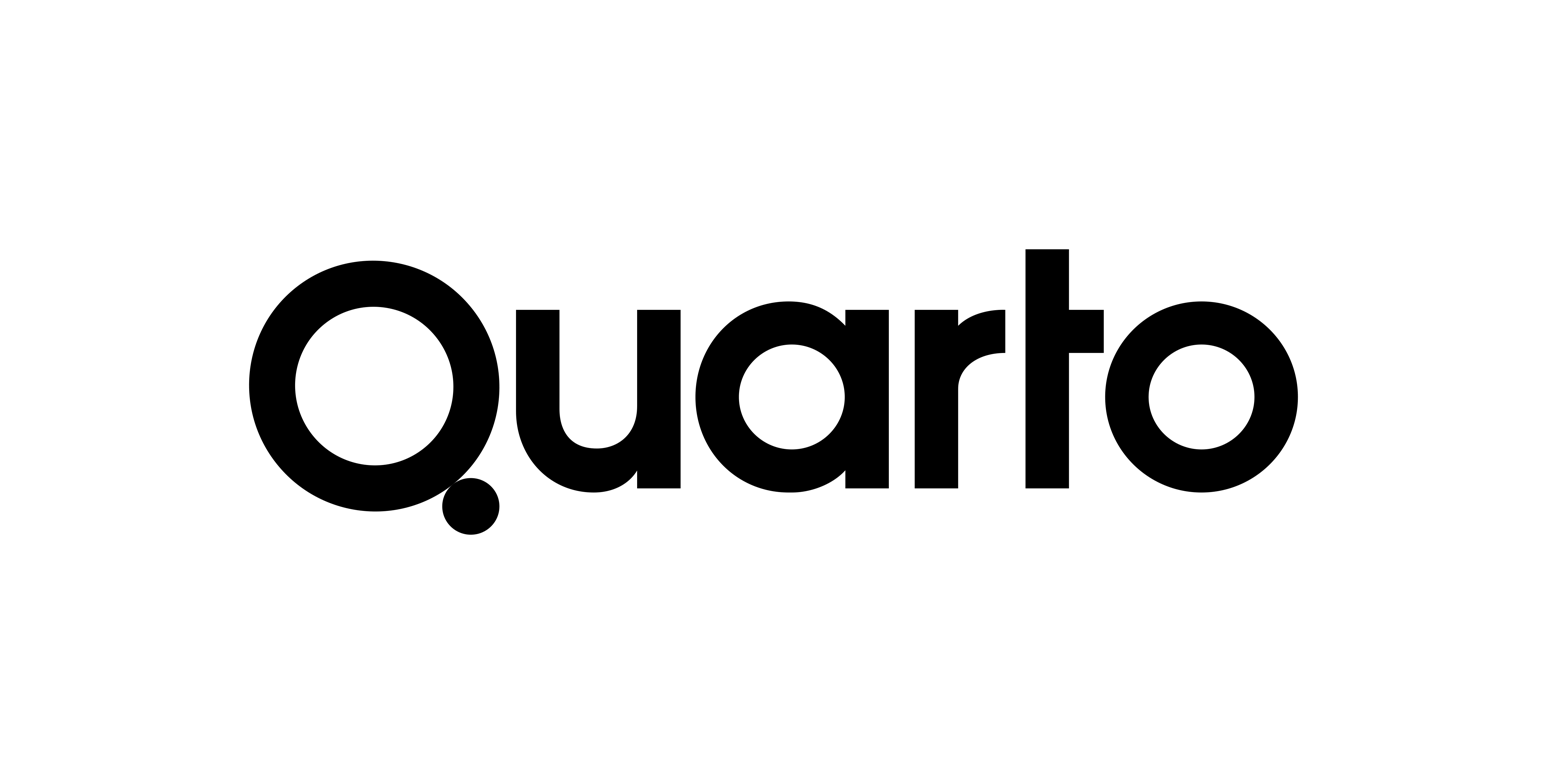
- Founded: 1976 (as The Quarto Group)
- Founders: Bob Morley, Michael Jackson, Laurence Orbach
- Country of origin: United Kingdom
- Headquarters location: London
- Distribution: Hachette (UK, US)
- Key people: Chuk Kin Lau, President; Andy Cumming, Chairman; Alison Goff, Group CEO
- Imprints: Below
- Revenue: ▲$ 151.5 million (2021)
- Official website: quarto.com

The Quarto Group is a global illustrated book publishing group founded in 1976. It is domiciled in the United States.

Quarto creates and sells illustrated books for adults and children, across 50 countries and in 40 languages, through a variety of traditional and non-traditional channels. Quarto employs around 300 people in five offices in London, Brighton, New York City, Boston, and Hong Kong. In July 2020, its publication This Book Is Anti-Racist by Tiffany Jewell reached the Number 1 position on The New York Times bestseller list.

The group was established by co-founders Laurence Orbach and Robert Morley and was listed on the London Stock Exchange in 1986. Orbach was chairman and CEO until November 2012, when he was replaced as chairman by Tim Chadwick and as CEO by Marcus Leaver.

Chuk Kin Lau, the principal shareholder, became Group CEO in July 2018. In February 2020, the Italian publisher Giunti took a significant shareholding and Andrea Giunti joined Quarto's board of directors.

In September 2020, Chuk Kin Lau became President and Polly Powell was appointed Group CEO. In January 2022, Alison Goff was appointed new Group CEO. The company decided to delist from the London Stock Exchange in January 2024.

== History ==
The Quarto Group was founded by Bob Morley, Michael Jackson and Laurence Orbach in the early 1970s and was finally established as The Quarto Group in 1976. In 1986, Quarto listed on the London stock exchange.

By the late 1990s, Quarto had acquired three new imprints, Rotovision, Book Sales Inc and Rockport Publishers and founded Quarto Children's Books, Quintet and Quintessence that published art, health, lifestyle and children's books. The group expanded further in the US – with the addition of Book Sales, Rockport Publishers, Walter Foster, Creative Publishing International, Motorbooks, and more recently, Cool Springs Press. In the UK, Quarto grew by acquiring Aurum Press and then Jacqui Small in 2004. By the 2000s, The Quarto Group had increased imprints and genres, along with this, a steady increase in its share value. In August 2011, The Quarto Group acquired independent UK book publisher Frances Lincoln for £4.5 million.

In 2012, Marcus Leaver took over from Laurence Orbach as Group CEO By 2014, the group had started two new children's imprints: Wide Eyed Editions and Words & Pictures, and acquired Small World Creations. In 2015 Quarto acquired Ivy Press and Ivy Kids for £1.5m and continued its expansion In 2016, Quarto acquired SmartLab and becker&mayer, a co-edition publisher based in Bellevue, WA, for $9.8 million.

Quarto sold its last two non-publishing businesses in 2017 – Books & Gifts Direct (Australia/New Zealand) and Regent Publishing Services (Hong Kong) – and is now solely focused on its core publishing expertise.

== Awards ==
- 2016 Waterstones Children's Book Prize – Illustrated Book: The Bear and the piano, by David Litchfield, published by Frances Lincoln Children’s Books.
- 2017 Waterstones Children's Book Prize – Illustrated Book: There’s a tiger in the garden, by Lizzy Stewart, published by Frances Lincoln Children’s Books.
- Blue Peter Book Awards 2019, Best Book with Facts: The Colours of History, by Clive Gifford, published by QED Publishing.
- British Book Awards 2018, Rights Professional of the Year: Karine Marko, Group Director of Foreign Rights at The Quarto Group.

== Controversy ==
Investigative research by the Financial Times found out that since 2020, Quarto has been censoring some of its books in order to allow them to be printed and sold in China. References to Taiwan, Tibet, Hong Kong, and the Chinese dissident Ai Weiwei were deleted or altered, including in the award-winning book This Book is Anti-Racist.

== International publishing partnerships ==
The Quarto Group has launched a number of foreign-language imprints through international partnerships with foreign publishers. These include:

Quarto Editora

The Quarto Editora imprint was launched in Brazil in 2014 through an international publishing partnership with Brasil Franchising and their publishing business Editora Nobel. Quarto Editora publishes in categories such as cookery, beauty and self-help. Nobel Editora distributes the books through its franchises and main book trade channels.

Kalimat Quarto

Kalimat Quarto was launched in 2016 as an international publishing partnership with Sharjah-based Kalimat Group. The imprint publishes books in Arabic and distributes them throughout the Middle East and North Africa.

Quarto Iberoamericana

Announced in May 2017, Quarto Iberoamericana is Quarto's Spanish language imprint launched in partnership with Argentina-based publisher Catapulta Editores S.L. The imprint publishes 20 books a year with the first six books, launching in Autumn 2017, in adult categories such as cookery, lifestyle and spirituality. Catapulta Editores will be responsible for sales and distribution in Spain, Argentina, Chile, Uruguay, Paraguay, Bolivia, Peru and Ecuador. Quarto is expected to announce more partners to distribute the books in the rest of Latin America and North America in the near future.

Quantumn Publishing

In addition, Quatro owns Quantumn Publishing, which publishes books in London for third parties who own various imprints but do not have their own physical publishing operations. As part of this business, Quantumn Publishing also offers design and editing services to these international third parties; they are credited, after the party that officially is the publisher, as "This book was produced by Quantum Publishing".

== Imprints ==
- Aurum Press (Note: Source of main list: "Our Imprints". The Quarto Group. n.d. Archived from the original on 25 November 2021.)
- becker&mayer! books
- becker&mayer! kids
- Book Sales
- Bright Press
- Burgess Lea Press
- Carnival
- Chartwell Books
- Cool Springs Press
- Creative Publishing International
- Design Eye
- Epic Ink Books
- Fair Winds Press
- Frances Lincoln
- Frances Lincoln Children's Books
- Global Book Publishing
- Happy Yak
- Harvard Common Press
- Holler
- Iqon Editions
- Ivy Kids
- Ivy Press
- Kaddo
- Leaping Hare Press
- Motorbooks
- MVP Books
- Quarry Books
- Quarto Publishing
- Quiver
- Race Point Publishing
- Rock Point Gift & Stationery
- Rockport Publishers
- Voyageur Press
- Walter Foster
- Walter Foster Jr.
- Wellfleet Press
- White Lion Publishing
- Wide Eyed Editions
- words&pictures
- Zenith Press

== See also ==
- Books in the United States
- Books in the United Kingdom
