= Wenlock Priory =

12th-century monastery in Shropshire, England

Coordinates: 52.59739°N 2.55506°W

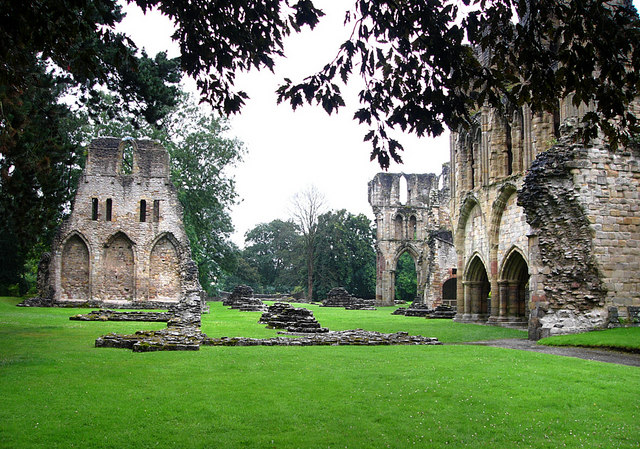
The west end of the Priory Church, with a remnant of the north transept at left

Wenlock Priory, or St Milburga's Priory, is a ruined 12th-century monastery, located in Much Wenlock, Shropshire, at grid reference SJ625001. Roger de Montgomery re-founded the Priory as a Cluniac house between 1079 and 1082, on the site of an earlier 7th-century monastery. In 1101 bones, believed to be those of Saint Milburga, were discovered beneath the floor of the old church. The relics were ceremoniously translated to the main monastery church.

Parts of the building became a house later known as "Wenlock Abbey", which is privately owned by Gabrielle Drake, the actress, who bought it with her late husband, Louis de Wet, in 1983, but most of Wenlock Priory is open to the public under the care of English Heritage and is used mostly for recreational purposes. The grounds have a collection of topiary; the gardens are listed Grade II in Historic England's Register of Parks and Gardens.

== History ==
=== Early history ===
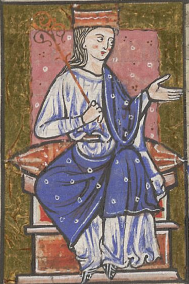
Æthelflæd gave land and a golden chalice to the Priory

Merewalh, King of the Magonsaete, a sub-kingdom of Mercia, founded the original Anglo-Saxon monastery here circa 680, and Merewalh's daughter Milburga became its second abbess, and was later canonised. At that time called "Wimnicas" it was a double monastery, housing both monks and nuns. After her death in 715, however, little is historically known of the monastery until the Norman Conquest, although it is known that at the end of the ninth century, in 901 Æthelflæd (daughter of Alfred the Great) and Æthelred gave land and a golden chalice weighing thirty mancuses to the shrine of Saint Mildburg.

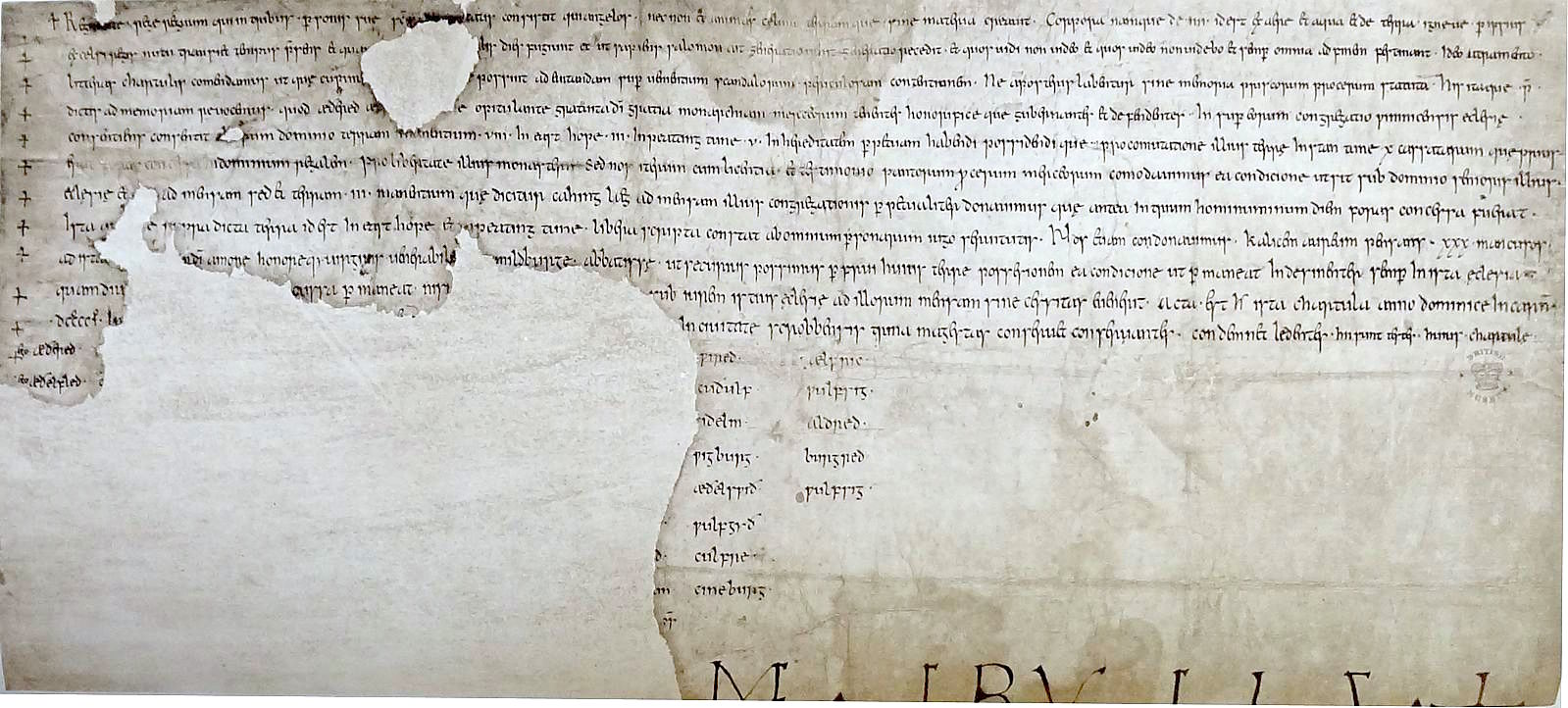
Charter S 221, dated 901, of Æthelred and Ætheflæd, donating land and a golden chalice to Much Wenlock church.

The priory continued to be inhabited by monks at least until the mid 11th century, when endowments were made by Leofric, Earl of Mercia.

Roger de Montgomery, Earl of Shrewsbury, was one of the great Norman lords during William the Conqueror's reign. He re-founded Wenlock as a Cluniac house, bringing monks from La Charité-sur-Loire in central France. The monastery was established by 1086, when it is recorded in the Domesday Book.

In 1101, repairs were being made to the Holy Trinity Church, probably the original nuns' church, and bones were found under the floor of the church. These were believed to be those of Saint Milburga, and were transferred to the main monastery church. The story of the discovery is told in the Miracula Inventionis Beate Mylburge Virginis, attributed to Odo, Cardinal bishop of Ostia. Shortly after this, Goscelin of St. Bertin wrote a life of the saint, which together with miracles recorded at her shrine revived a local cult which endured through the Middle Ages.

By 1170, the monastery was able to send a prior and twelve monks to found the daughter house of Paisley Abbey in Scotland. Other dependent priories established around this time were Dudley Priory, St Helen's Priory and Church Preen.

The monastery church was rebuilt between the late 12th and mid 13th-Centuries. The visible remains of the church largely date to this period. Pevsner suggests a date of completion of 1200–1240 on stylistic grounds. King Henry III stayed at Wenlock on several occasions in the 1230s, and made numerous gifts to the priory. There are charges recorded for transporting wine to Wenlock for the king's visits. The Prior at this time was Humbert, and he travelled to Wales several times as the King's envoy.

The town of Much Wenlock formed gradually around the priory. The town is made up of a small network of intricate, narrow streets lined with timber-framed black and white buildings. Within the town is the well of St Milburga of Wenlock, which was said to have cured sight impairments and helped Victorian women find a suitor.

=== Dissolution ===
The monastery was dissolved on 26 January 1540. Proposals had been made for creating a new diocese, with the church at Wenlock becoming a cathedral, as happened at Gloucester, but these were not implemented, and most of the buildings were destroyed. The late 15th-century Prior's House and the adjoining infirmary building were converted into a private residence later known as "Wenlock Abbey".

== Description of the site ==
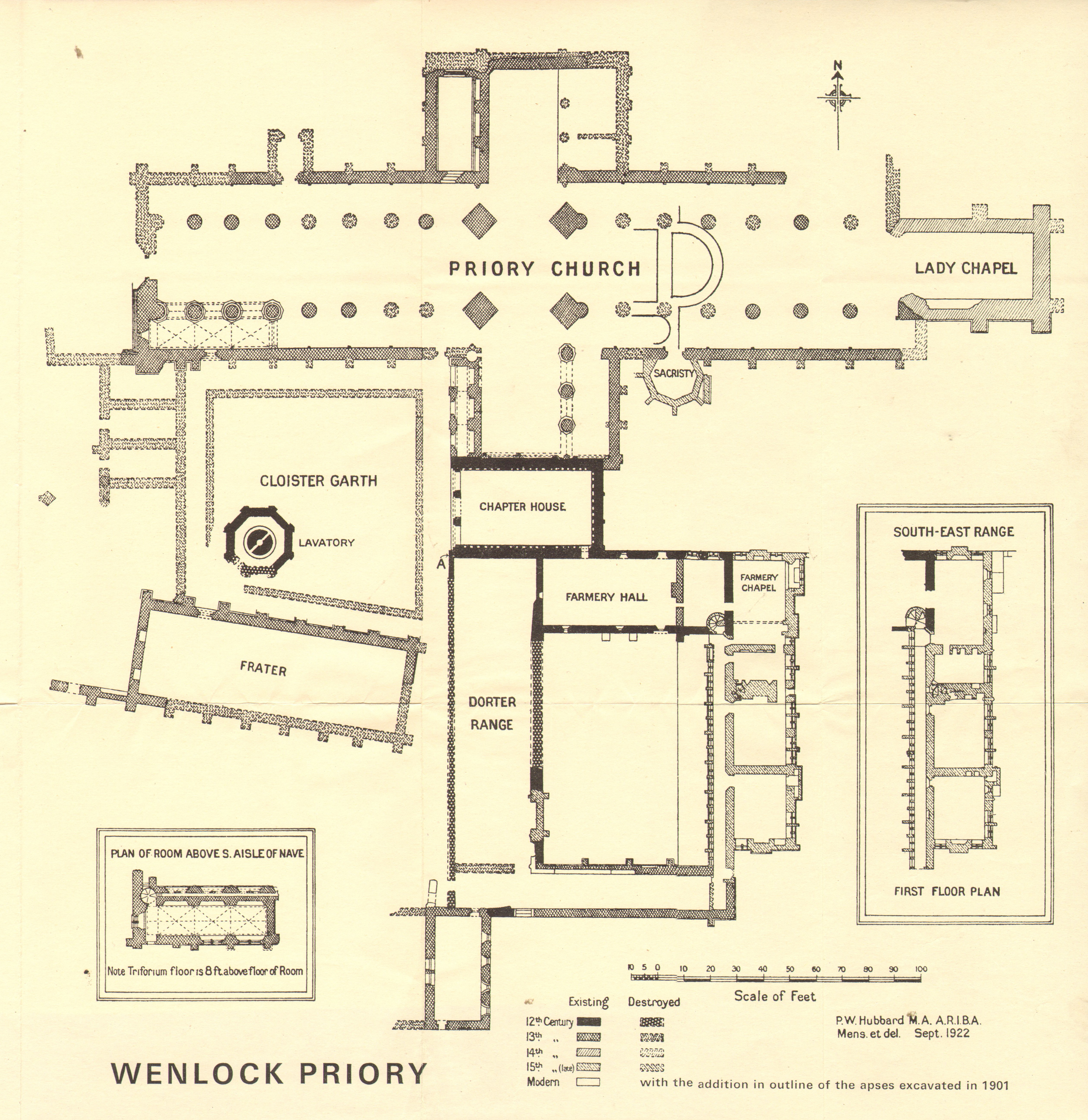
Plan of the Priory. The structure labelled as the lavatory in the cloister is the lavatorium or lavabo, used for washing hands.

The layout of the church and monastic buildings is clearly visible. The arrangement is conventional, with a cruciform church, a cloister to the south of the nave of the church, and the monastic buildings around the cloister. Of the church, the south transept, the west wall of the north transept, and the south-west three bays of the nave stand to their full height. Of the monastic buildings, there are substantial remains of the chapter-house, the library, and the lavatorium, while part of the later infirmary and prior's lodging have been converted to a private house.

The South Transept is the best-preserved part of the church. The east wall has an arcade of three arches which opened into chapels. Above this is a triforium passage with paired lancets and a clerestory with a single window in each bay, also with a wall-passage. The south wall has two blank arches, three blank lancets above, then three stepped lancet windows above that. A single lancet is in the upper part of the gable. The west wall is mostly blank at the lower level, with triforium and clerestory above. Near the crossing is a laver or water stoup, with three blank arches, and the remains of a pipe-channel and drain. The west wall of the North Transept has a single surviving complete bay, similar in layout to the south transept. A blocked door leads to the remains of the sacristy on the west side of the transept, which has three large arched recesses and a crypt. The transepts, like the rest of the church, were vaulted as can be seen from the remains of the vaulting shafts.

Three bays of the south-west part of the Nave survive. This shows an unusual design as a room has been constructed above the aisle vaults, requiring them to be lower than in the rest of the church. The function of this vaulted space is not known. Graham (1965) suggests, by analogy with other Cluniac houses including Cluny itself, that it was a chapel to St Michael.. However, there is no evidence of the existence of an altar.

Little survives of the Cloister itself. The Library opens from the west wall of the south transept, with a single original arched opening, and two later flanking arches. South of this, three round arches with zigzag ornament lead into the Norman Chapter House of about 1150–1180. This is decorated with three levels of intersecting round arches, a common motif in chapter houses of this period. The vaulting shafts show that the chapter house was vaulted in three bays. In the cloister garth are the remains of a Lavabo, a place for the monks to wash. The base and the foundations of the surrounding pavilion can be seen. The base has two well-preserved carved stone panels from the late 12th century, showing scenes from the lives of the Apostles.

South of the chapter house, are the Infirmary and the Prior's Lodging now forming an L-shaped private house, described by Pevsner as "one of the finest examples of domestic architecture in England about the year 1500".

In 2026, three fragments of decorative tiles were returned to the priory by a man who had taken them from the ruins as a boy in the late 1960s. Tiles of this kind are known from only three sites in Shropshire, the others being Bridgnorth Friary (no longer extant) and Haughmond Abbey. One of the returned fragments featured a dragon motif, a design not previously recorded at the priory.

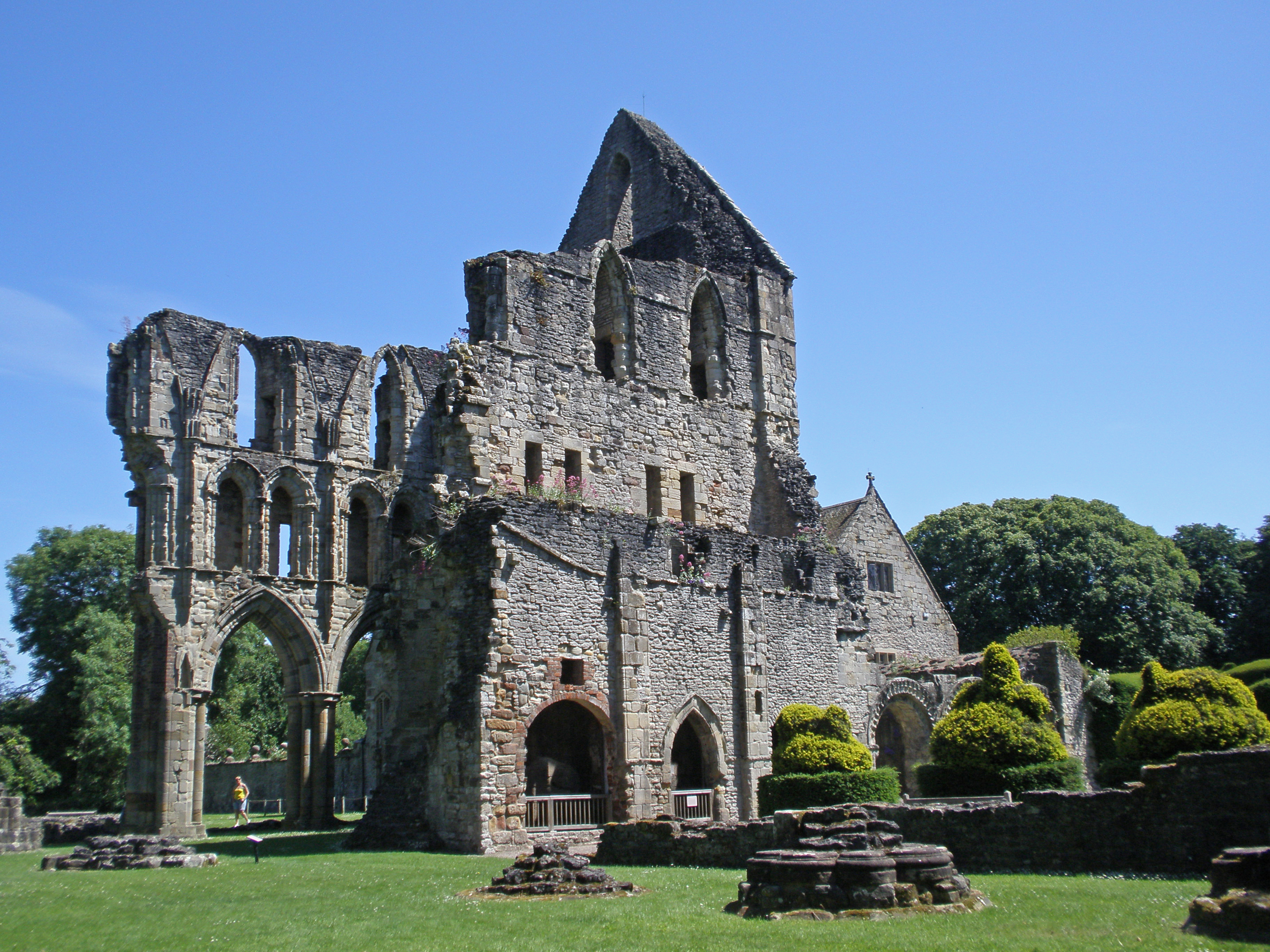
South transept from the north west

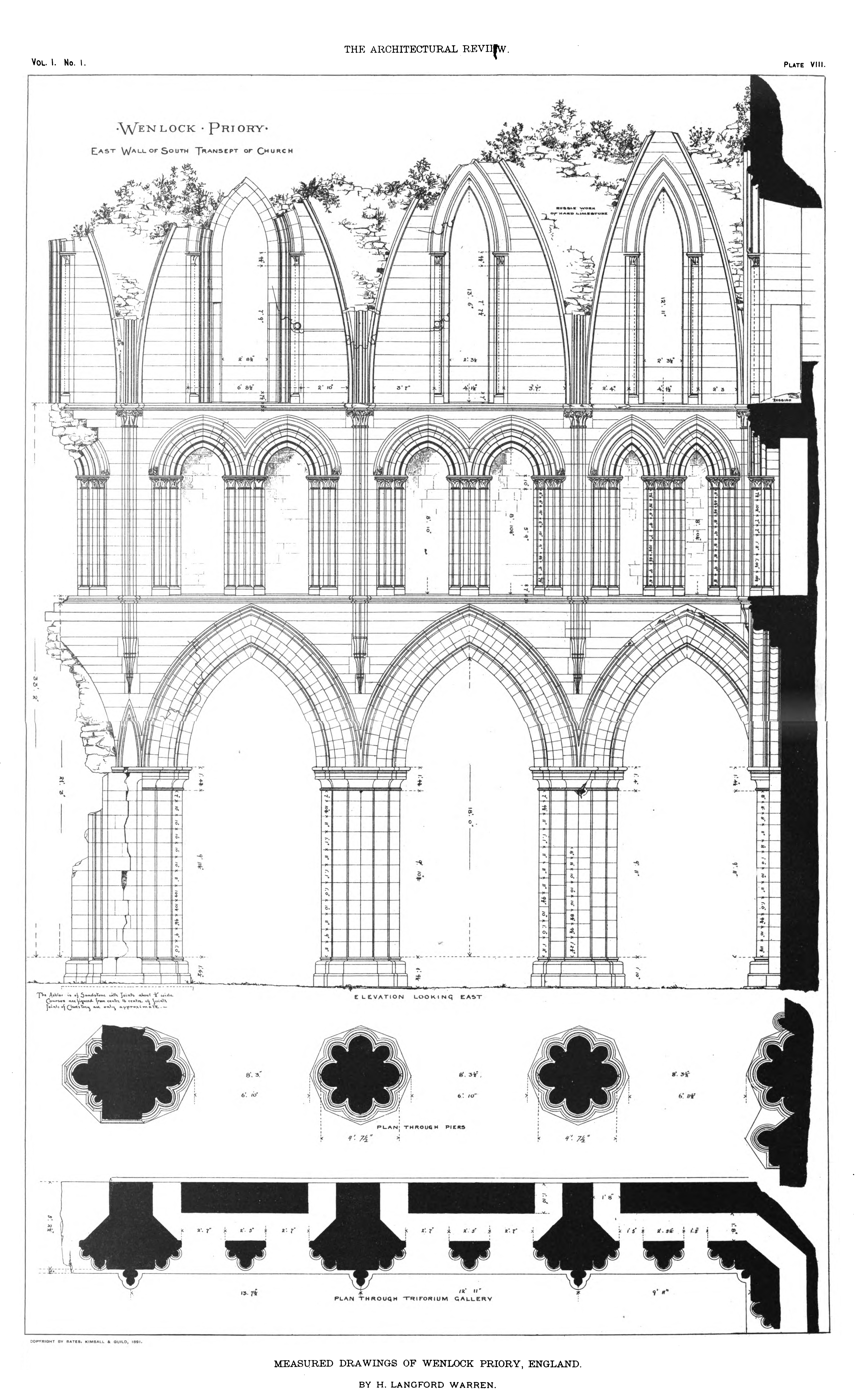
Elevation of east wall of south transept

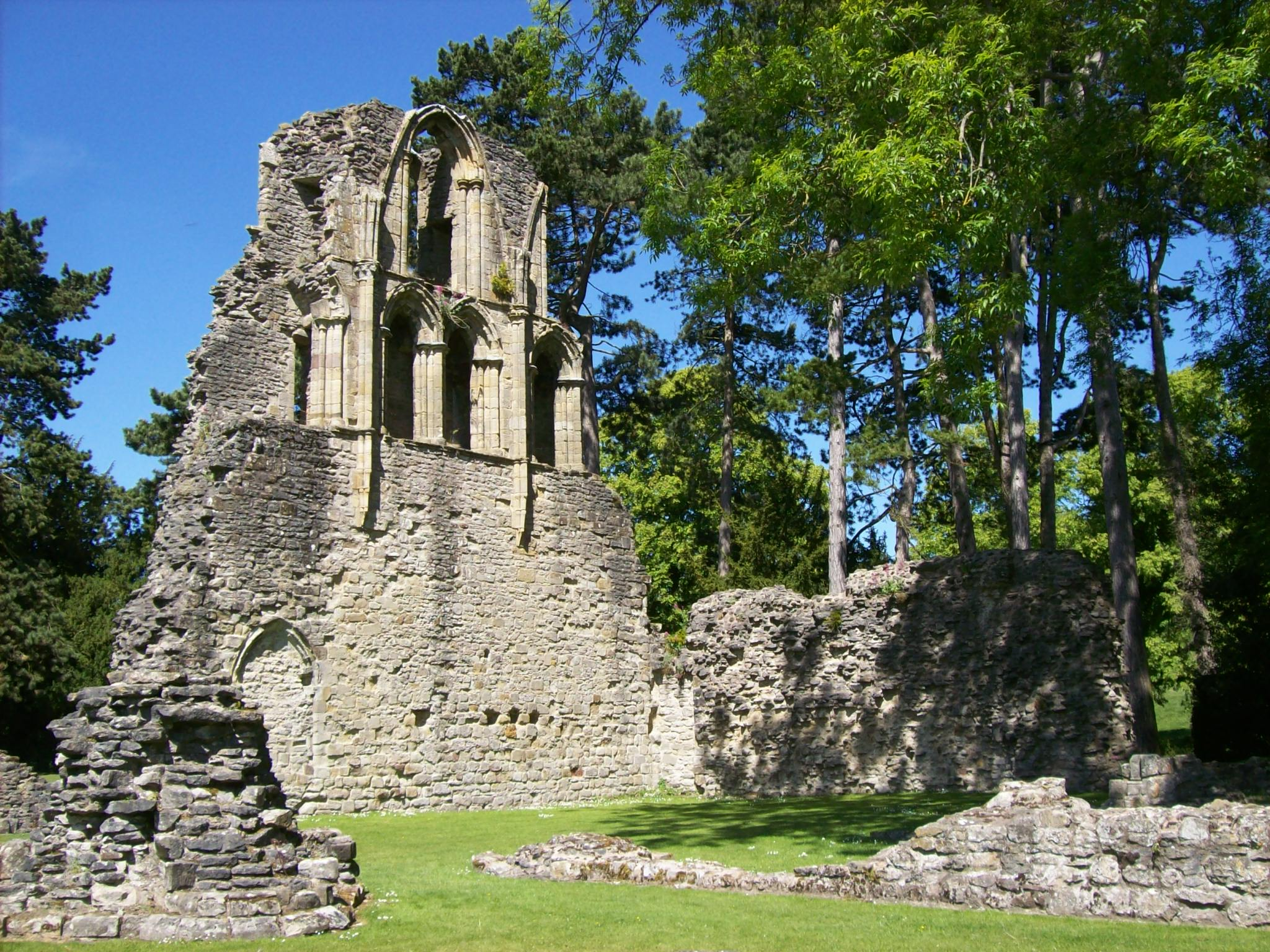
North transept from the south east. The blocked doorway leads to the sacristy

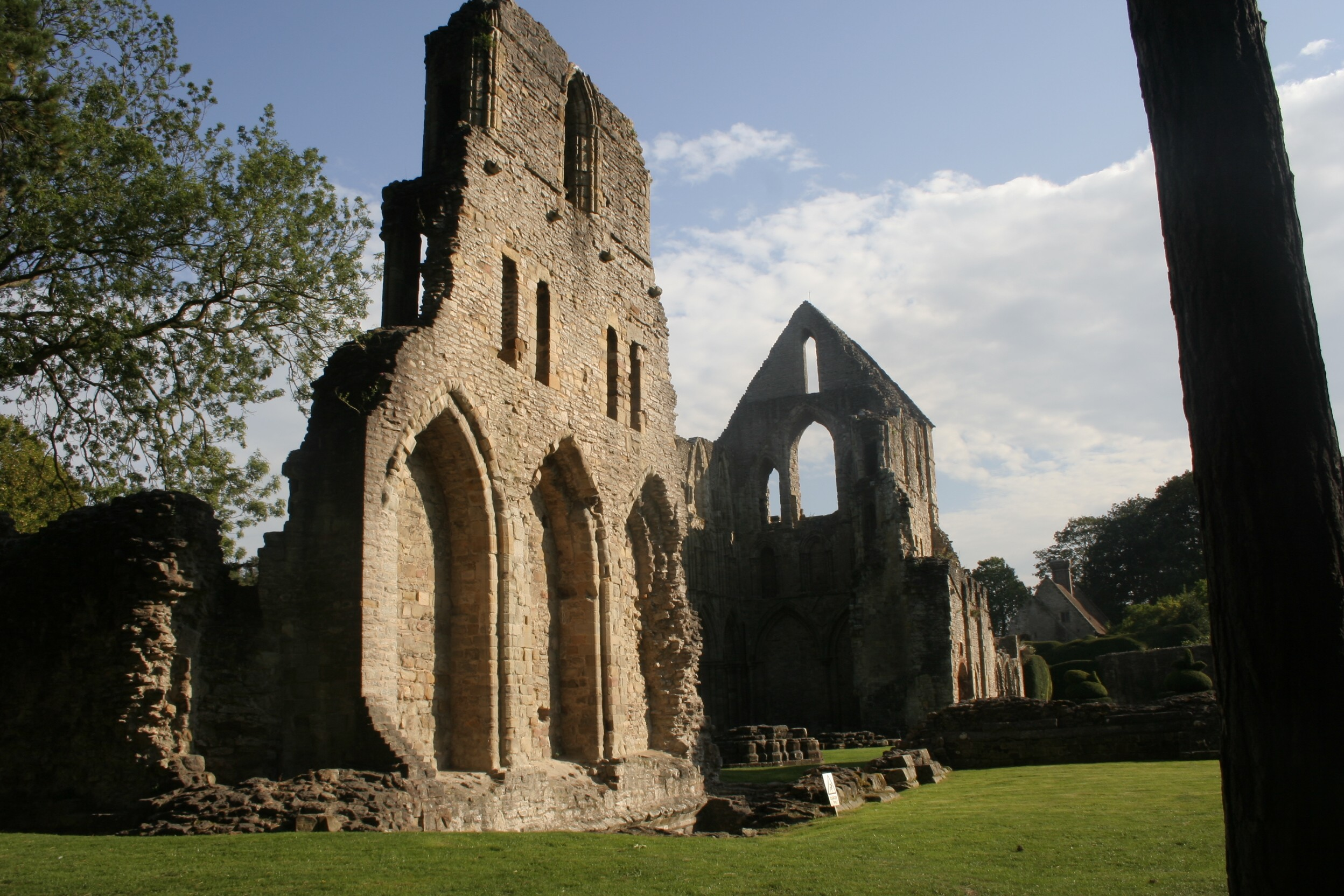
North transept from the north west, showing the arched recesses of the Sacristy

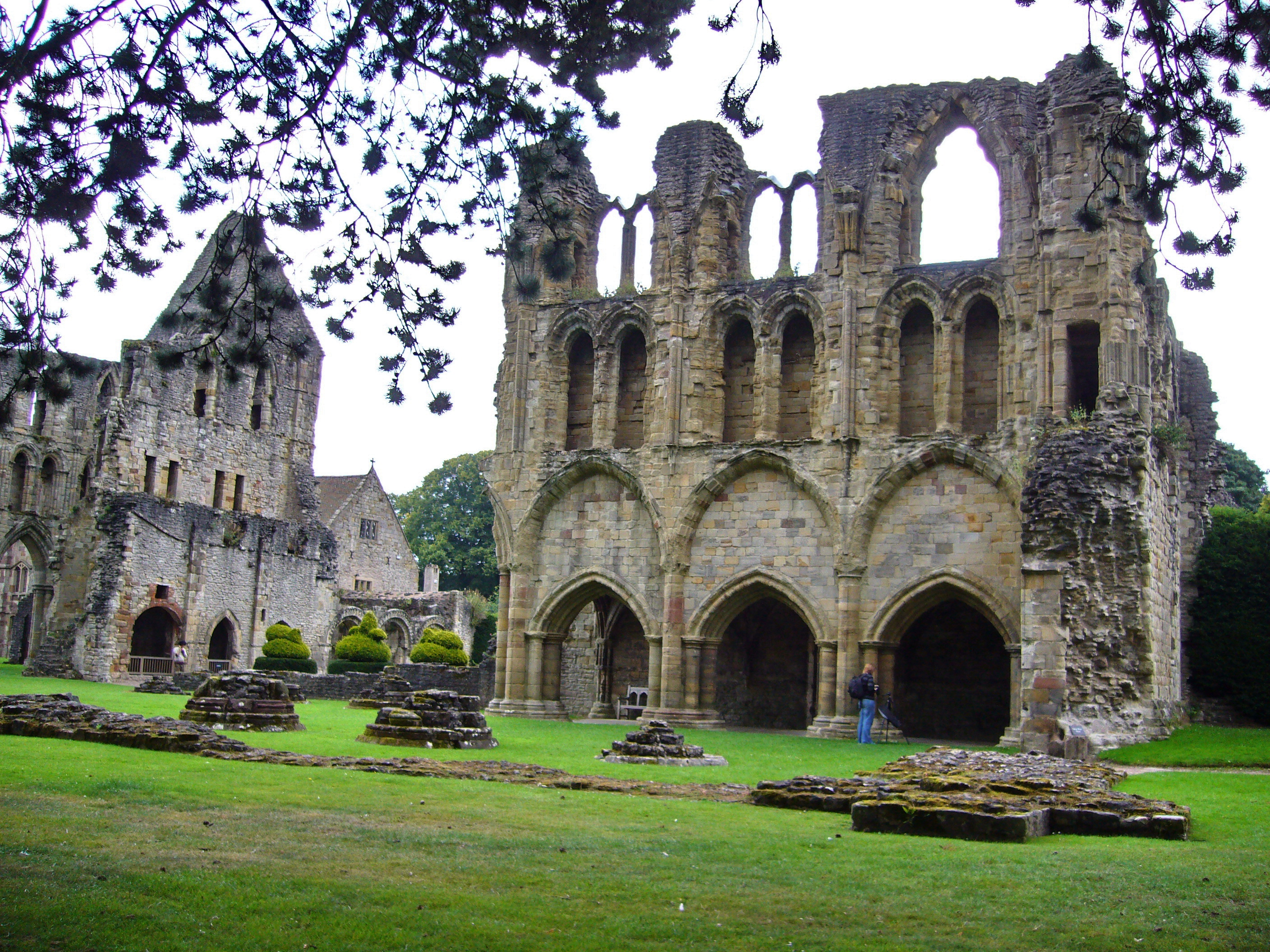
South west part of the nave, showing the lowered arcade to accommodate the upper chamber

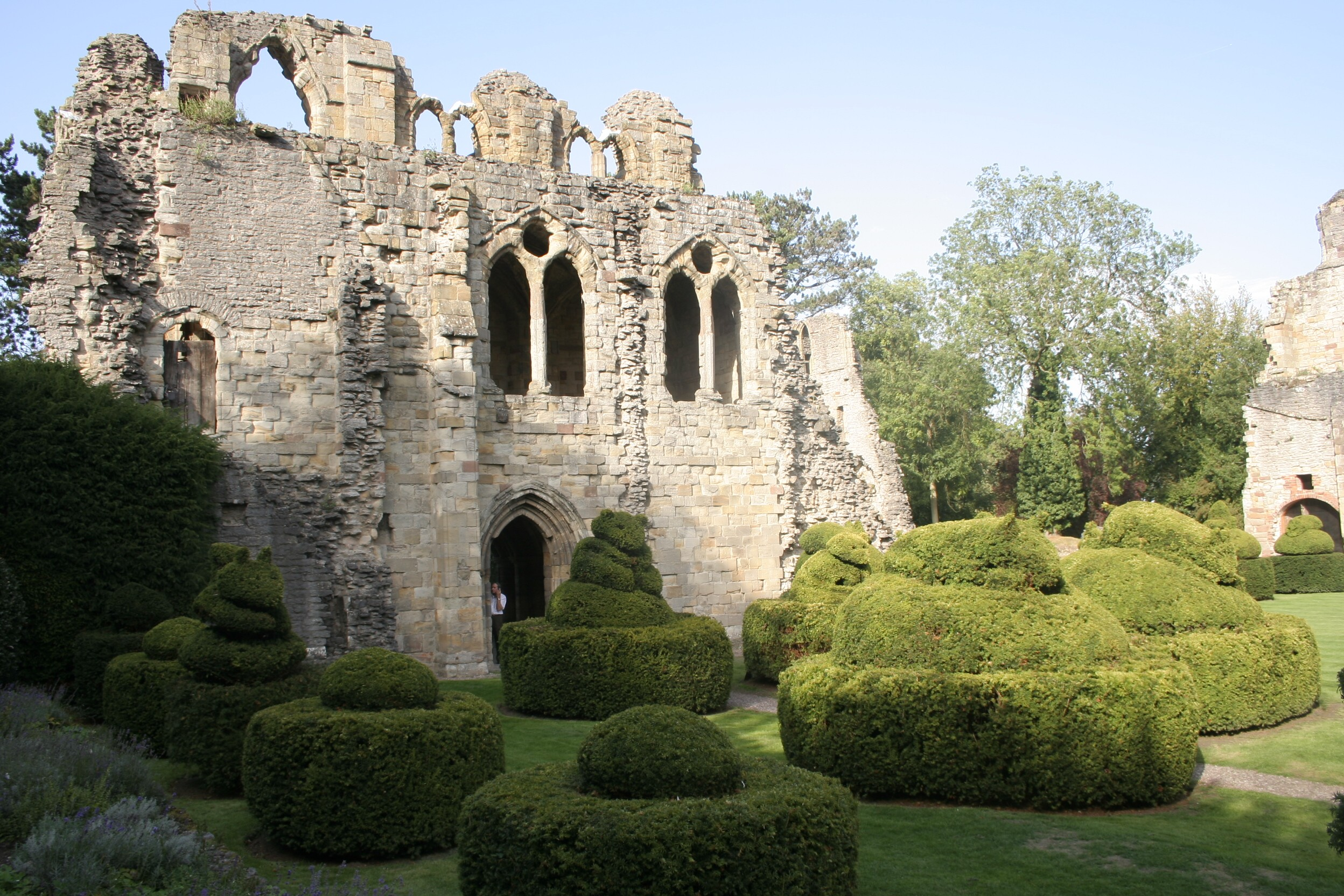
South west part of the nave, from the cloister

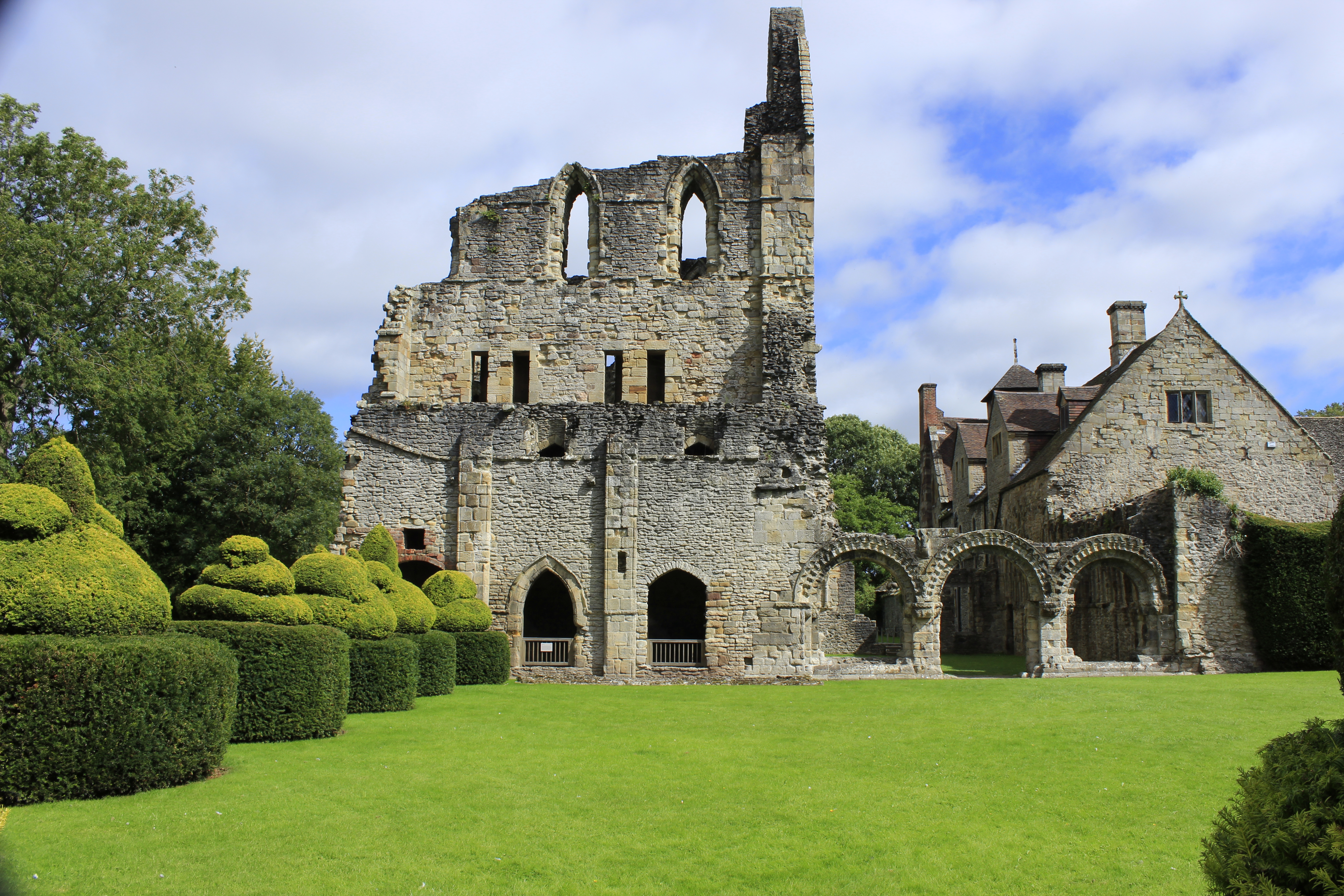
Library (left) and arched entrance to the chapter house, from the cloister

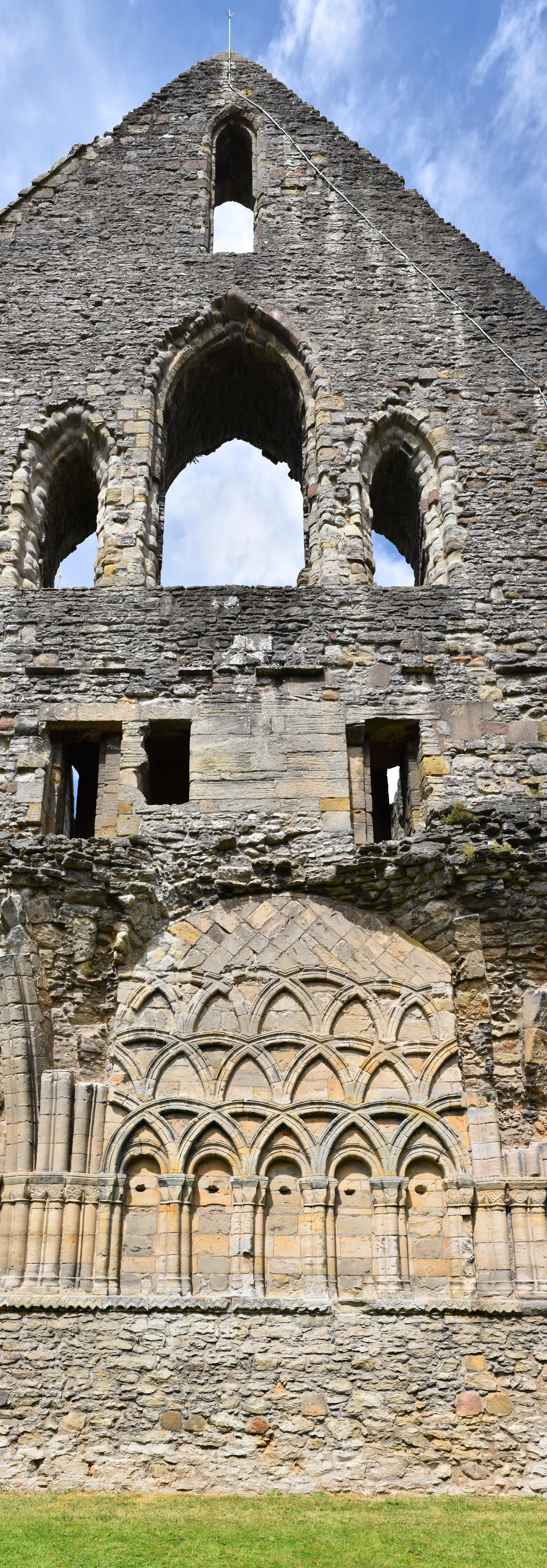
Chapter house intersecting arches and south transept gable

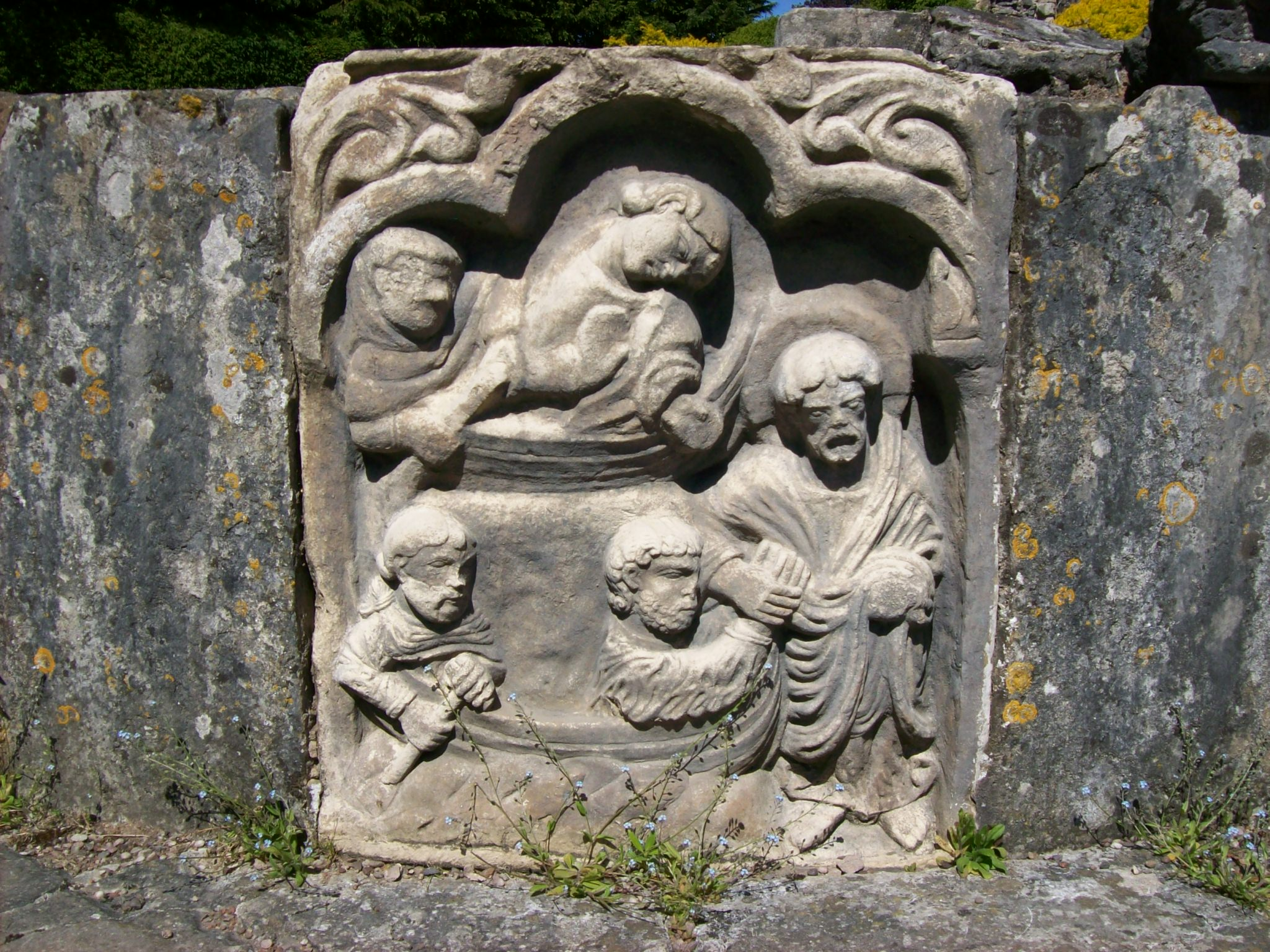
Sculpture on the base of the Lavabo, "I will make you fishers of men"

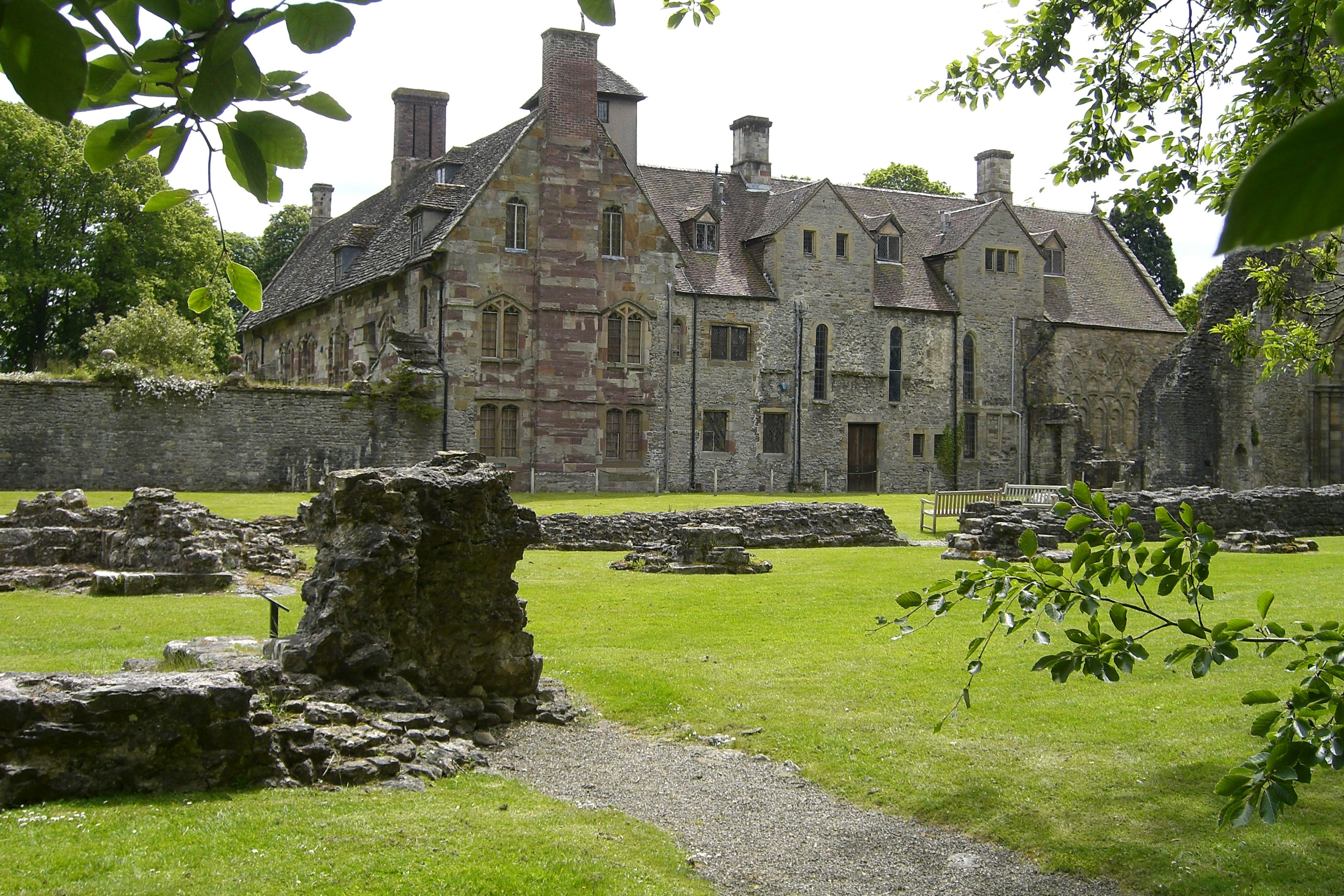
Prior's Lodging and infirmary

== See also ==
- Grade I listed buildings in Shropshire
- Listed buildings in Much Wenlock

== Sources ==
- "Charter S 221". The Electronic Sawyer: Online Catalogue of Anglo-Saxon Charters. London, UK: King's College London.
- Lapidge, Michael (1993). Anglo-Latin Literature 900–1066. London, UK: The Hambledon Press. ISBN 978-1-85285-012-8.
- Thacker, Alan (1985). "Kings, Saints and Monasteries in Pre-Viking Mercia". Midland History. X: 1–25. doi:10.1179/mdh.1985.10.1.1. ISSN 1756-381X.
