= Lavers =

Lavers is an English surname. Notable people with the surname include:

- Alan Lavers (1912–1995), British cricketer
- Charles Lavers (1896–1979), British World War I flying ace
- Paul Lavers (born 1950), British television presenter
- Steve Lavers (born 1954), Australian rugby league footballer
- Waldron Lavers (1911–1979), Canadian politician and judicial clerk
