= Lever (disambiguation) =

A lever is a mechanical device to multiply force.

Lever may also refer to:

== Entertainment and media ==
- "Lever" (song), a 1998 single by The Mavis's
- "The Lever" (song), a 2002 song by Silverchair
- The Lever, an American news outlet

== Other uses ==
- Lever action, a firearm action
- Lever (surname), and persons with the name
- Lever, Portugal, a former civil parish in Portugal
- Levee (ceremony), referred to in French as a lever
- Lever (company), a US software company
- Lever Brothers, British household goods company

== See also ==
- Leverage (disambiguation)
