= Peter Leaver =

British barrister, judge and football administrator (1944–2026)

Peter Lawrence Oppenheim Leaver, KC (28 November 1944 – 2 September 2026) was a British barrister, judge and administrator who was chief executive of the Premier League from 1997 to 1999.

Leaver was educated at Aldenham School and Trinity College Dublin and a member of One Essex Court for many years. He was a deputy High Court judge from 1994 to 2017, and was chairman of the London Court of International Arbitration from 2008 to 2012.

Leaver died on 2 September 2026, aged 81. He was the father of the publishing executive Marcus Leaver.
