= Basil Laver =

Basil Laver MS FRCS
- Born: 18 December 1894; Middelburg, Transvaal, South Africa
- Died: 28 December 1934 (aged 40); Northampton, England

Basil Laver MS FRCS (18 December 1894 – 28 December 1934), was a British surgeon whose highly successful career was cut short through illness. Laver's obituary in the British Medical Journal commented on his 'dynamic energy and capacity for work, his acute inquisitiveness of mind, and his absolute intolerance of shibboleths of medicine'.

== Life ==
Basil Leslie Laver was born 18 December 1894 at Witfoot, Middelburg, Transvaal, South Africa, the third of the three sons of Henry Laver, merchant of Middelburg. Laver’s parents came originally from Southampton and he received his formal education at Bedford Modern School and medical education at Guy's Hospital.

During World War I he received a commission on 27 February 1915 as second-lieutenant in the Royal Field Artillery, and was subsequently adjutant and temporary major.

Laver returned to Guy's Hospital at the end of World War I, qualified, won the Arthur Durham scholarship and served as surgical registrar and assistant surgical tutor. Laver then settled at Northampton, where he was elected assistant surgeon to the General Hospital on 22 February 1927, becoming surgeon on 28 April 1931. He was also consulting surgeon to the Stamford and Rutland General Infirmary.

On 21 April 1928 Laver married Margaret Joyce Crockett, granddaughter of Sir James Crockett of Northampton who was the co-founder of Crockett & Jones. Laver died in Northampton on 28 December 1934 and his ashes were buried in Southampton. His wife and daughter survived him.
