= Marcus Leaver =

British businessman (born 1970)

Marcus Edward Leaver (born 1 April 1970) is a British publishing executive.

He was Chief Executive of Chrysalis Books Group from 2003 to 2005, President of Sterling Publishing from 2008 to 2012, and CEO of The Quarto Group from 2012 to 2018. In 2019, together with Mark Smith, Leaver established the Welbeck Publishing Group. In 2023 he launched Gemini Books Group, with the acquisitions of Imagine That!, Palazzo Editions, Ad Lib Publishers, Mardle Books, and Pimpernel Press.

The son of former Premier League Chief Executive Peter Leaver, he was educated at Eton College, the University of East Anglia (BA History of Art & Architecture, 1992) and London Business School (MBA, 1999).
