= Darcy Lever (author) =

Darcy Lever (c. 1759 – 1839) was a nineteenth-century British writer and expert in seamanship, most well known for his work The Young Sea Officer's Sheet Anchor: Or a Key to the Leading of Rigging and to Practical Seamanship. The book, first published in 1808 with a second edition in 1819, became the standard authority on traditional rigging and seamanship throughout the century.

== Biography ==
Lever was the eldest son of the clergyman Rev. John Lever and a nephew of Sir Ashton Lever. Darcy Lever lived for many years in the town of Alkrington. He spent many years in India, working for the British East India Company, earning him a comfortable income. Sheet Anchor, his only publication, was written as a reference for general use by young officers in the East India Company and the Royal Navy, and is well known for its detailed engravings which illustrate each concept addressed in the text. Lever himself never served in the Navy, and had little direct experience with sailing; his book is largely the result of extensive research he conducted himself, including multiple interviews with experienced seamen. During the Napoleonic Wars, however, Lever served as Adjutant to the North Battalion of the Leeds Volunteers.

In his memoir, former U.S. President Ulysses S. Grant says he read Lever's work while at West Point.
