= Lavatorium =

Communal washing area in a monastery

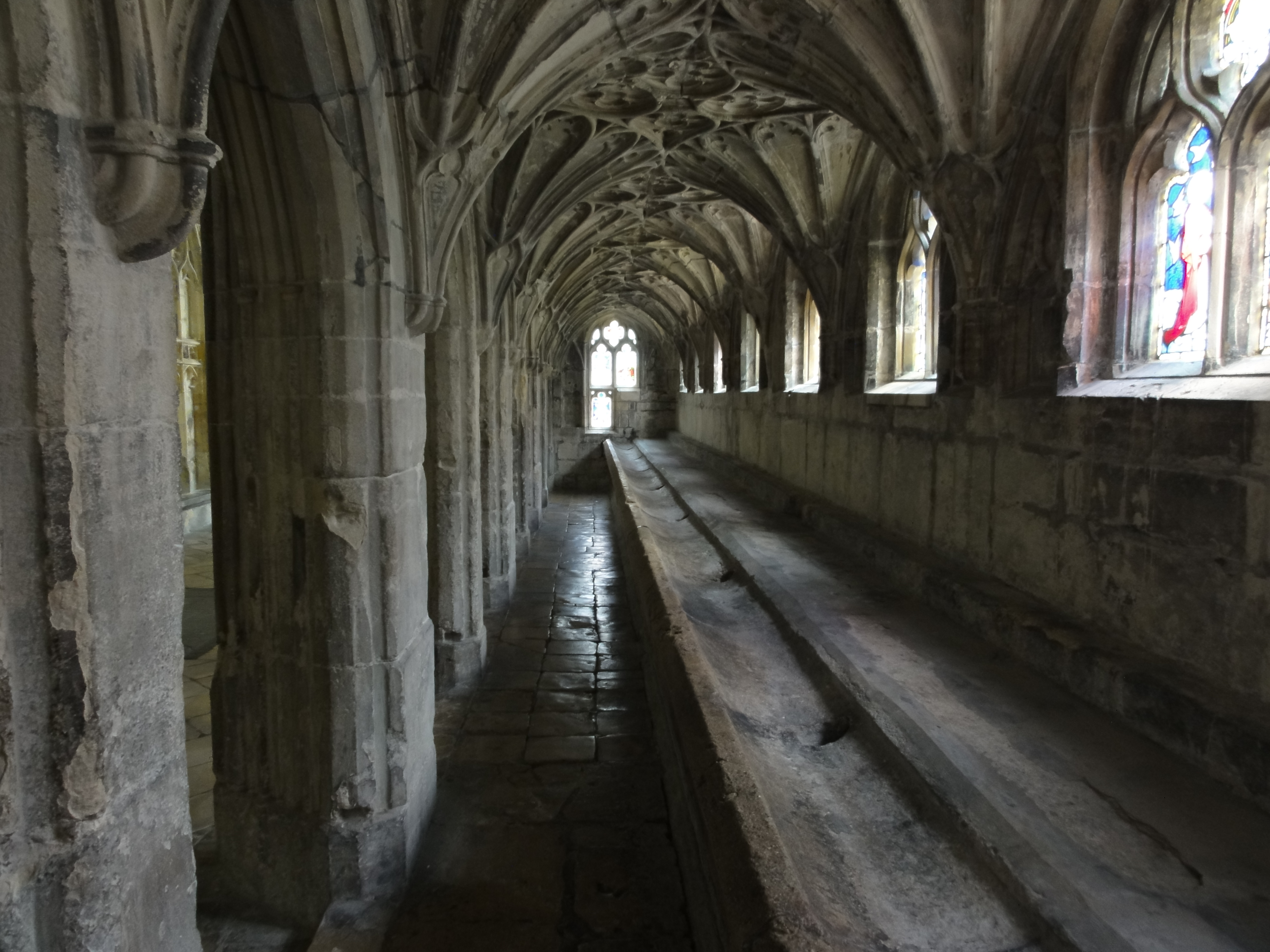
14th-century lavatorium at Gloucester Cathedral

A lavatorium (plural lavatoria), also anglicised as laver and lavatory, was the communal washing area in a monastery, particularly in medieval abbeys and cathedral cloisters. Monks were required to wash before meals; thus the lavatorium was typically adjacent to the refectory.

== Description ==
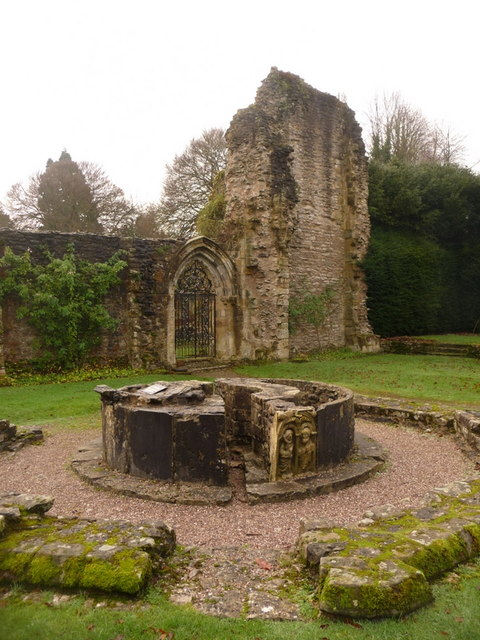
Ruins of octagonal lavatorium at Wenlock Priory

All monastic orders required handwashing before meals. A lavatorium was therefore provided near the refectory, either against one wall of the cloister with a long trench basin, or as a free-standing building with a circular or octagonal basin in the centre. An example of the first type, dating to the 14th century, survives at Gloucester Cathedral, and has a towel cupboard nearby. At Durham Cathedral, the lavatorium was a square building with a circular basin which was replaced in 1432–33 with one of marble. At Wenlock Priory, the octagonal lavatorium, now ruined, was decorated with late-12th-century carved panels including one of Jesus with the apostles at the Sea of Galilee. There were sometimes taps; at Wenlock Priory, the water spouted from animal heads mounted on the central pillar.

Running water was supplied in lead pipes, and where there were taps they were bronze, although in most cases in England metal fittings have been removed since the dissolution of the monasteries. The monks' towels were kept nearby in cupboards called aumbries (derived from the Latin armarium or from Medieval Latin almarium). The Refectorian was responsible for keeping the lavatorium clean and ensuring it contained sand and a whetstone for the monks to sharpen their knives, and for changing the towels twice a week.

== Gallery ==
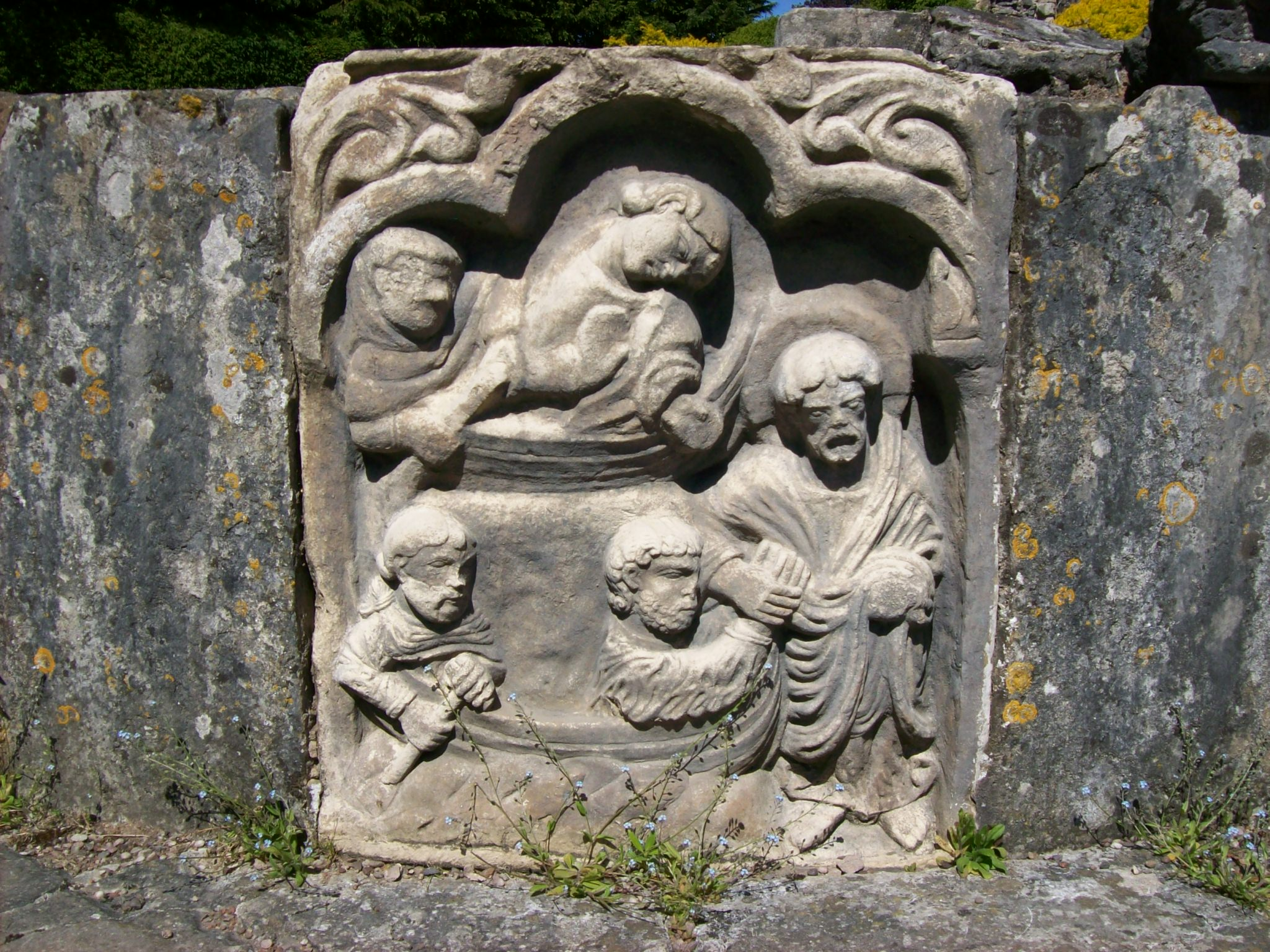
Jesus calling the fishermen; 12th-century carving from the lavatorium at Wenlock Priory, Shropshire

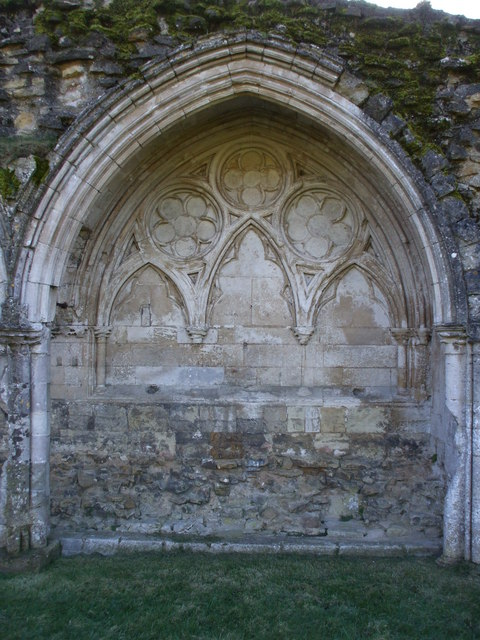
Arcade in the former lavatorium, Kirkham Priory, North Yorkshire (12th–13th century)

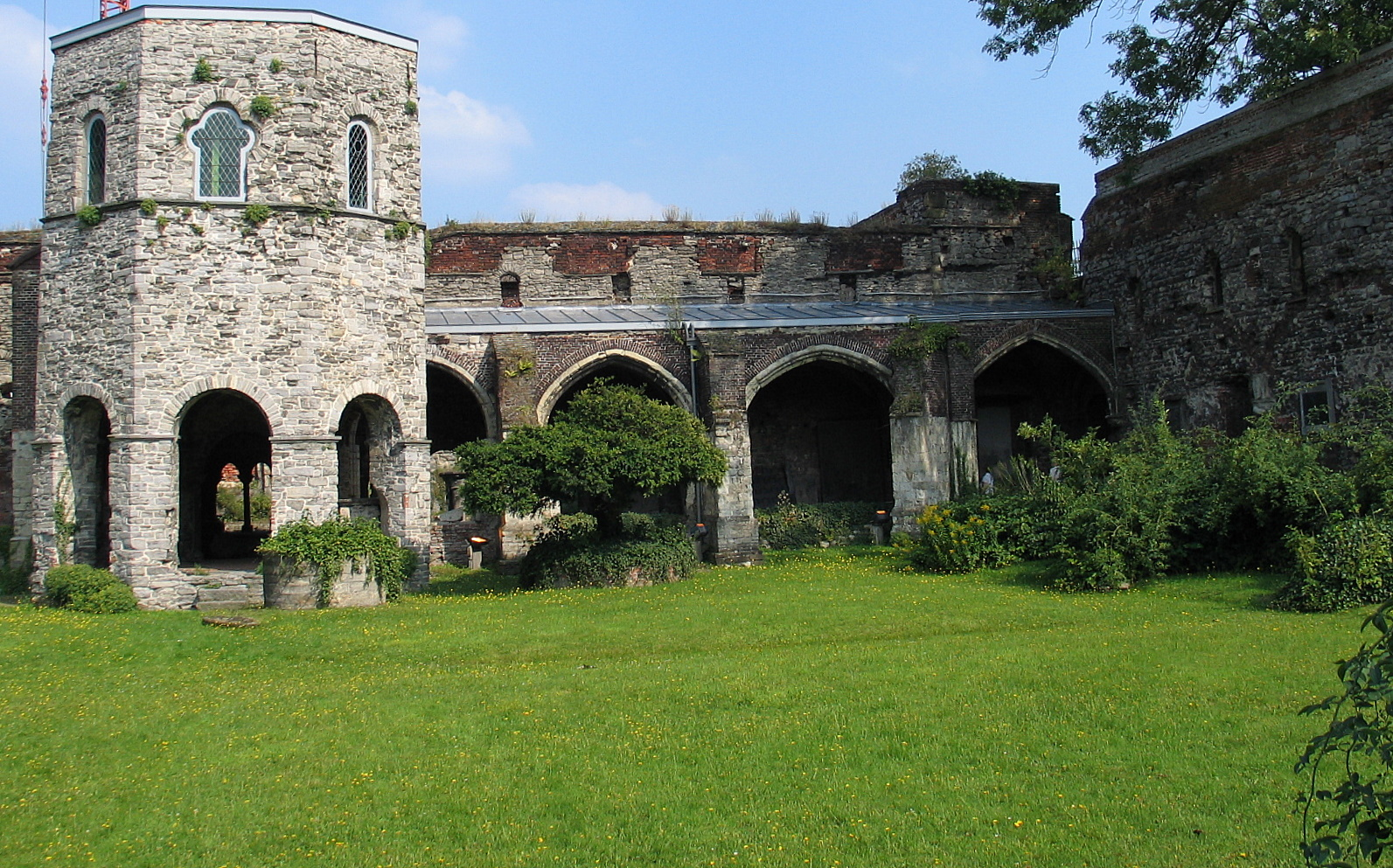
12th-century lavatorium at the Abbey of St Bavo, Ghent, Belgium

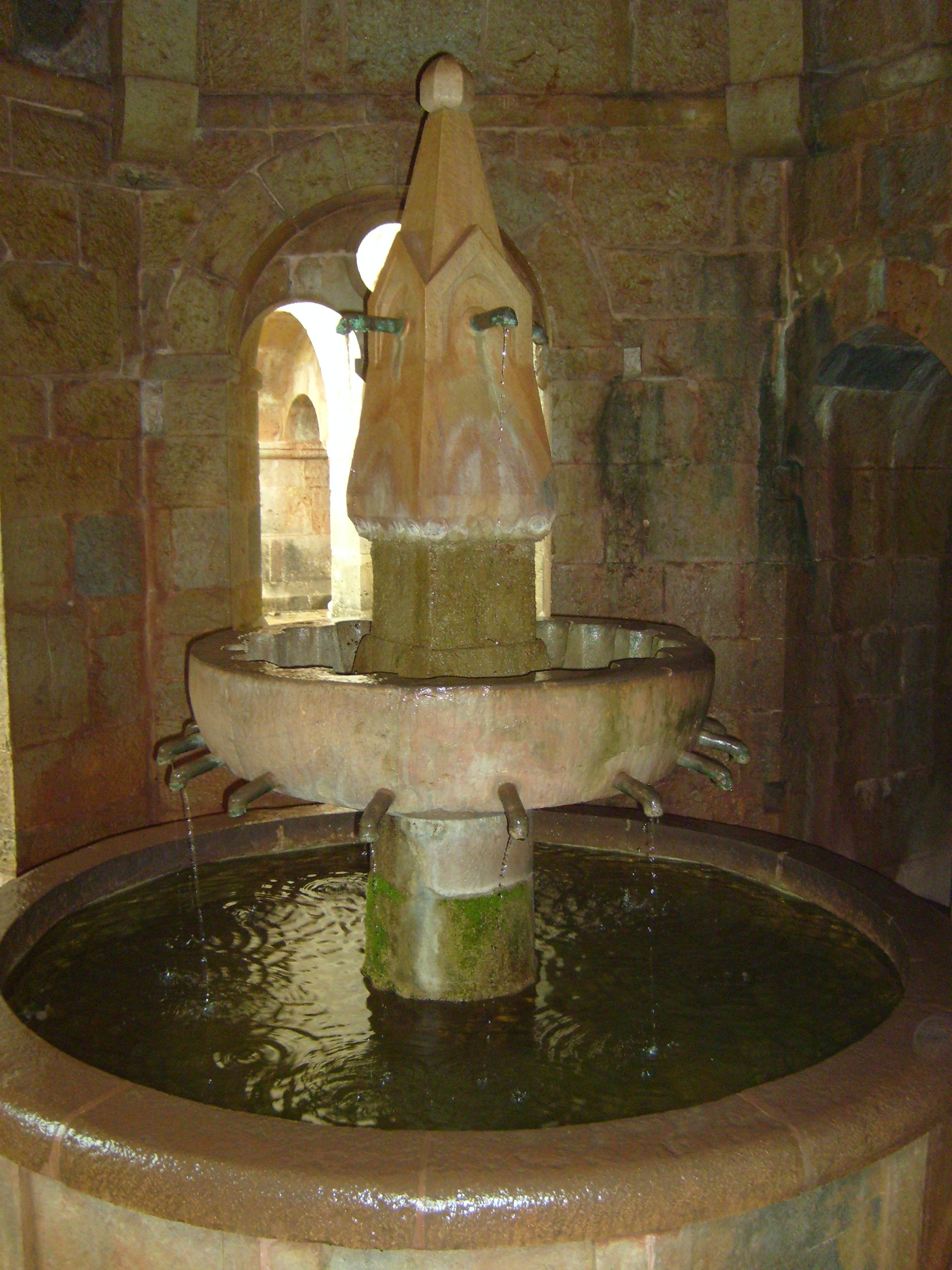
12th-century lavatorium at Thoronet Abbey in Provence, France

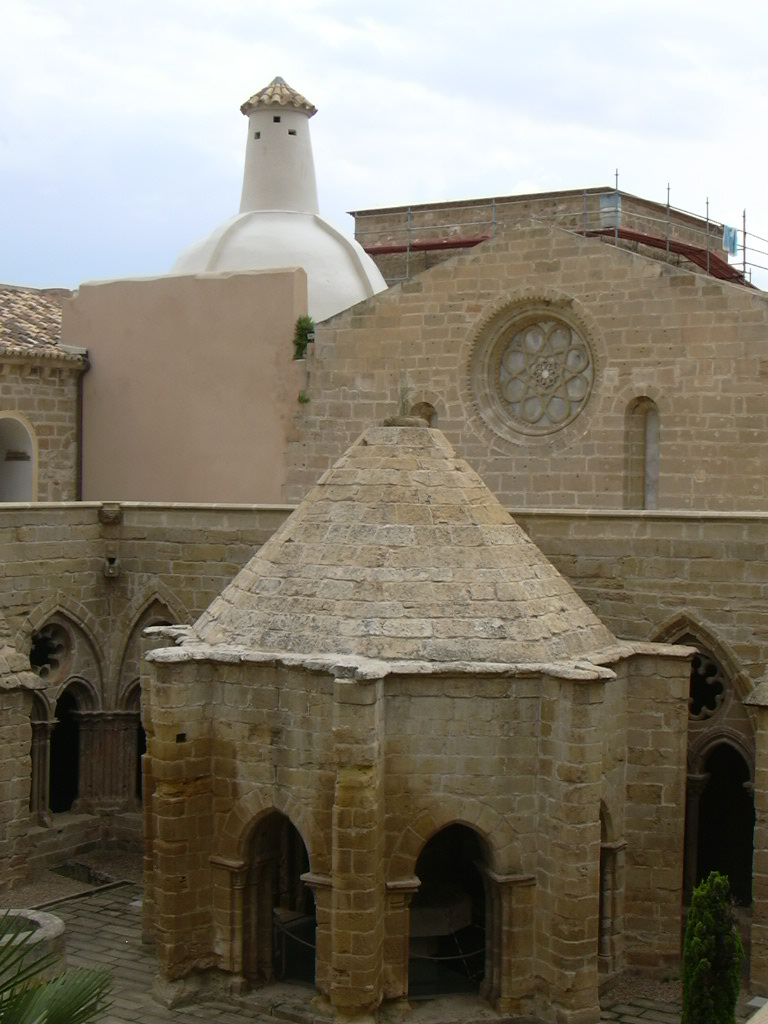
13th-century lavatorium at Rueda Abbey, Aragon, Spain

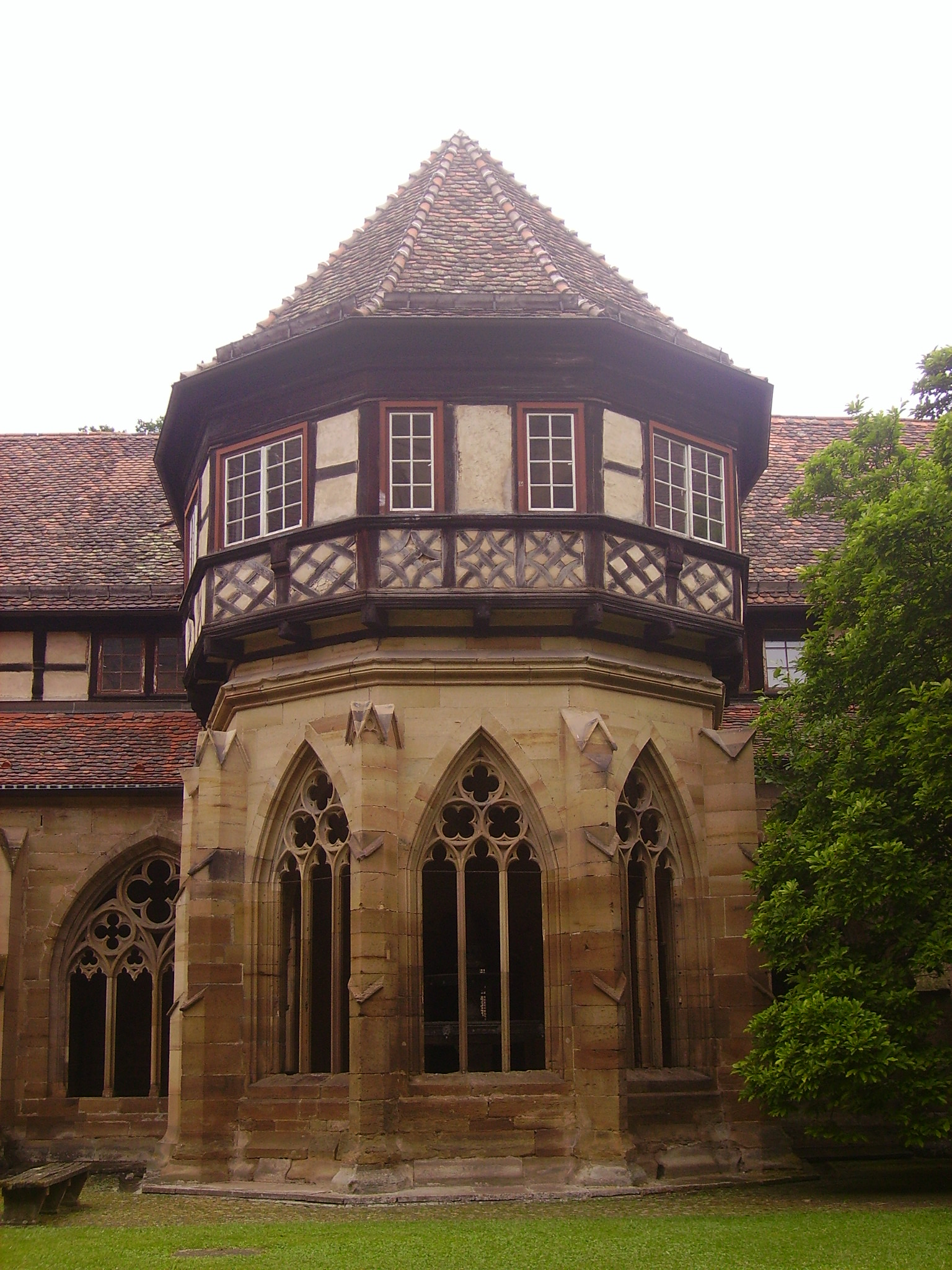
14th-century lavatorium at Maulbronn Monastery, Germany, exterior

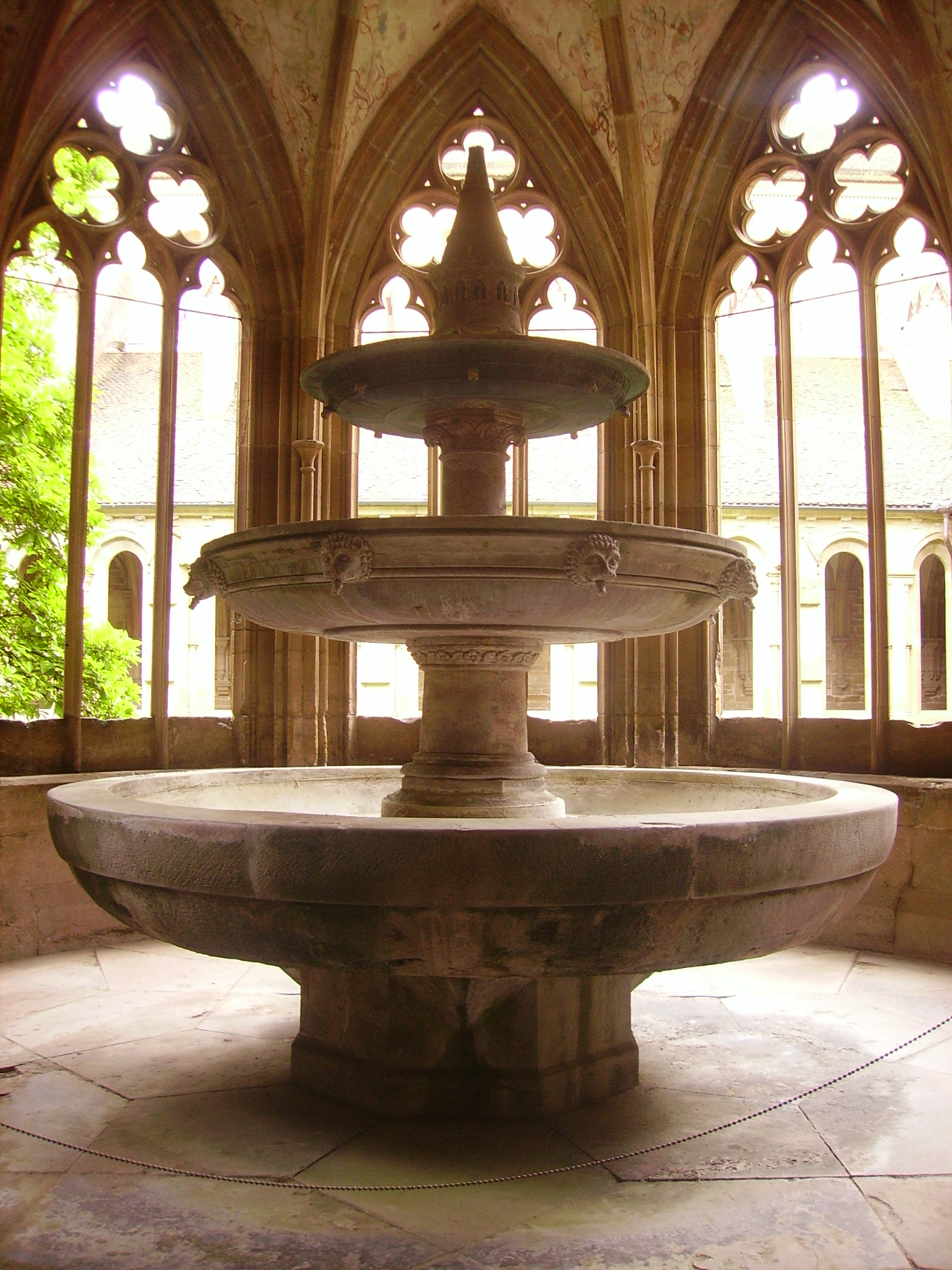
Maulbronn Monastery lavatorium, interior

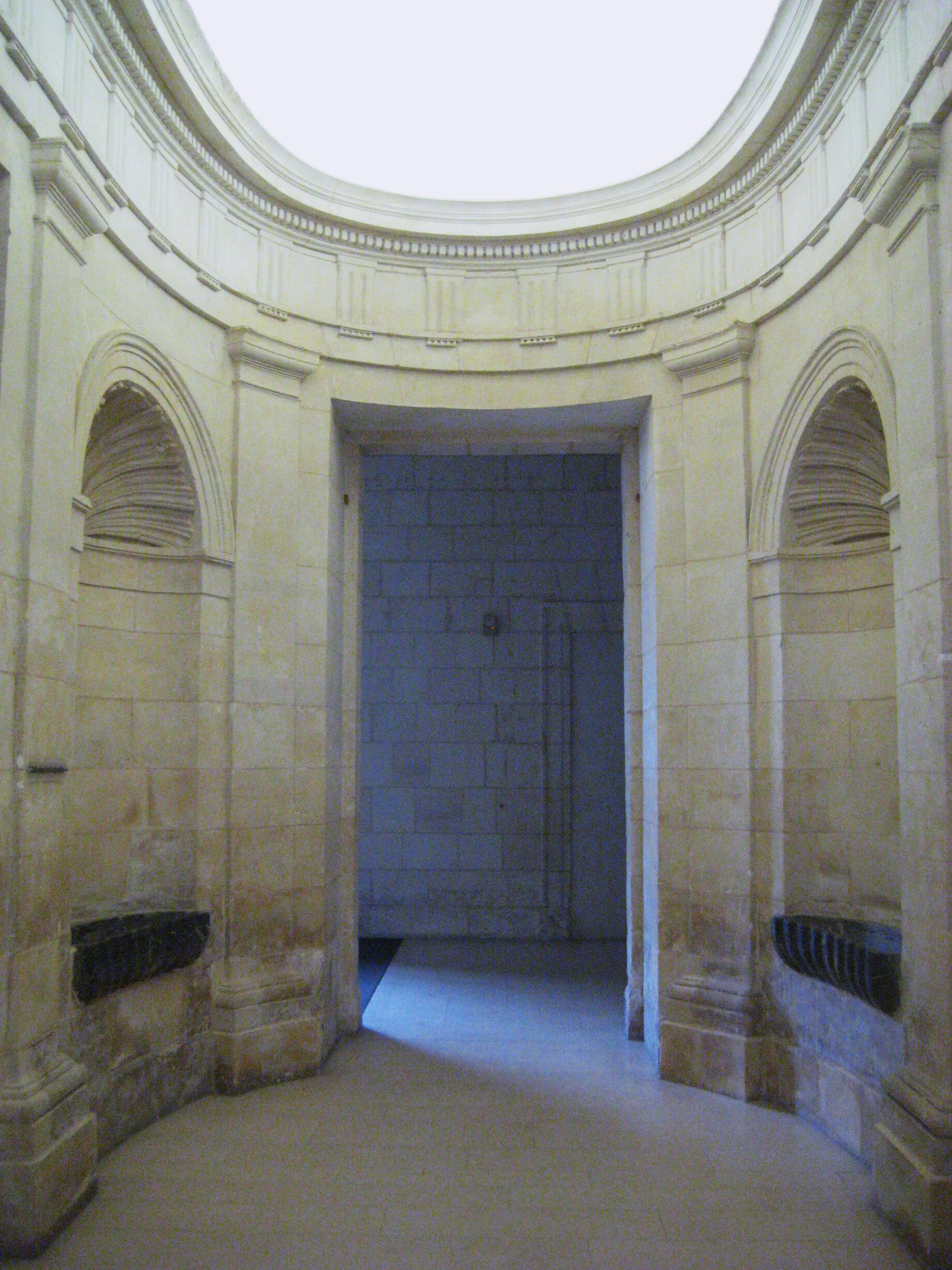
Lavatorium at Abbaye aux Dames in Caen, France

== See also ==
- Cantharus (Christianity)
- Hygiene in Christianity
