= Toxteth Park Cemetery =

Graveyard in England

Coordinates: 53.393661°N 2.942074°W

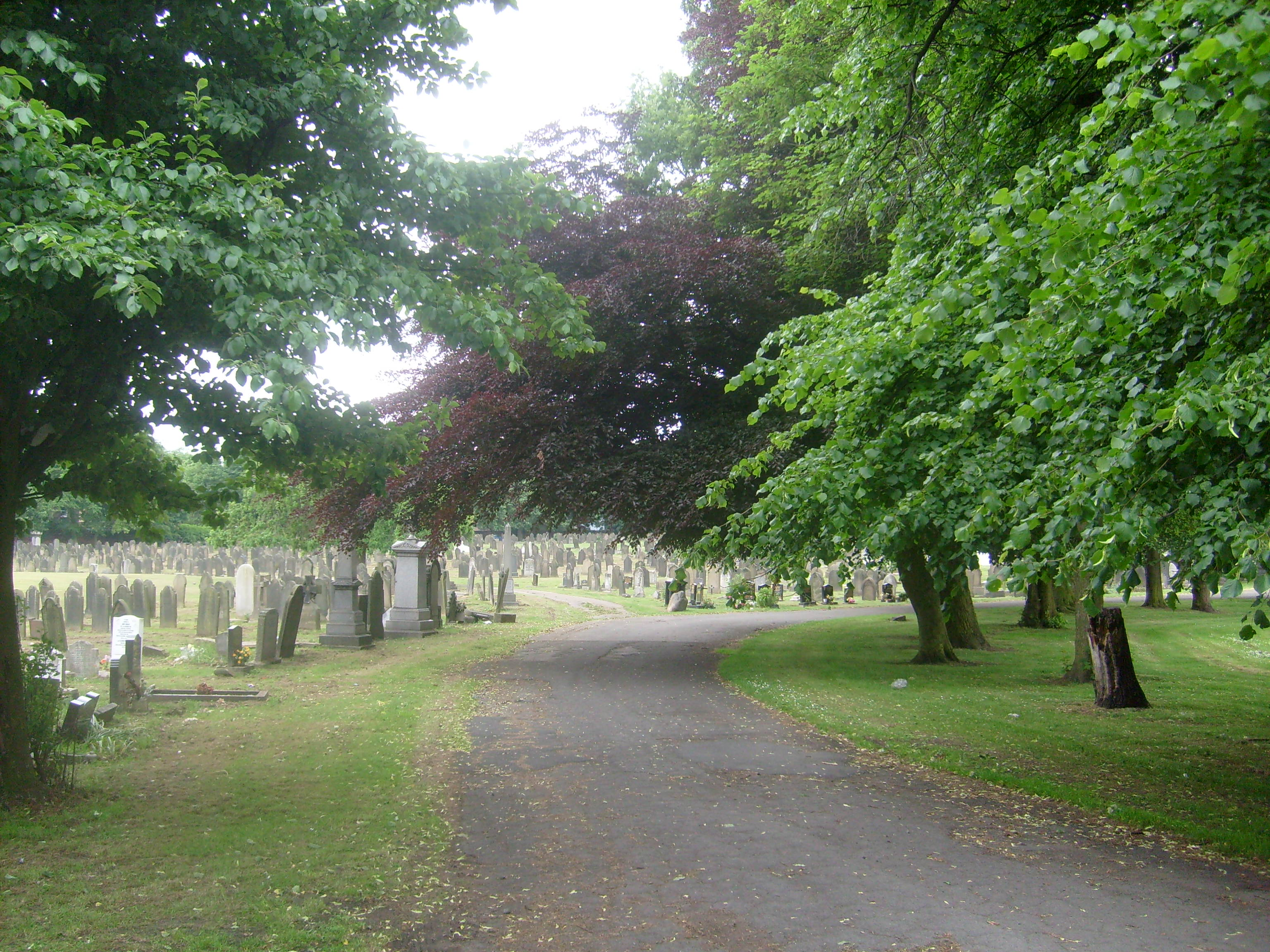
- Toxteth Park Cemetery
- Interactive map of Toxteth Park Cemetery

Details
- Established: June 1856
- Location: Liverpool, Merseyside
- Country: England
- Type: Public
- Owned by: Liverpool City Council
- No. of graves: 144,000
- Website: Official website

Toxteth Park Cemetery is a graveyard on Smithdown Road, Liverpool, United Kingdom. It was opened on Monday 9 June 1856. It was the responsibility of the Toxteth Park Burial Board, which had been established by at least 1855.

The opening ceremony was performed by the then Lord Bishop of Chester, and the first interment took place, that of an Elizabeth Watling on 17 June 1856.

The cemetery was built with consecrated and unconsecrated areas, and the layout, featuring walks, was by a "Mr Gay of Bradford cemetery".

It was taken over by Liverpool Corporation on 1 January 1905.

== Records ==
The cemetery's records are held on microfilm in the Liverpool Record Office, and provide the Burial Registers and the Order Books.

== Structures ==
The cemetery is itself Grade II listed and incorporates a derelict chapel, a derelict mason's yard and a pair of lodges or gatehouses at the Smithdown Road entrance. A significant number of obelisk and Celtic cross gravestones are also listed. The cemetery also contains Toxteth War Memorial.

To the rear, the cemetery bounds the back gardens of houses on Arundel Avenue, and can be accessed through turnstiles in an ornate gateway set back from that road at the end of a short lane. On the easterly lodge at the main entrance at Smithdown Road there is a sign with provision for the insertion of digits indicating the time of evening at which these rear entrance turnstiles will be closed, but for some time this sign has been disused, as this lodge also appears to be (the westerly lodge being inhabited and, as of spring 2009, up for auction.)

Grade II listed memorials include those of Sir John Bent, Eleanora and Willam Gillespie, Hetherington family, Dr James Sheridan Muspratt, Thomas Pennington, Robert Rodgers, Agnes and John Rowe and Patience Simpson

In 2009 a ceremony organised by Sons of Confederate Veterans, allegedly a Neo-Confederate organisation, rededicated the grave of Irvine Bulloch

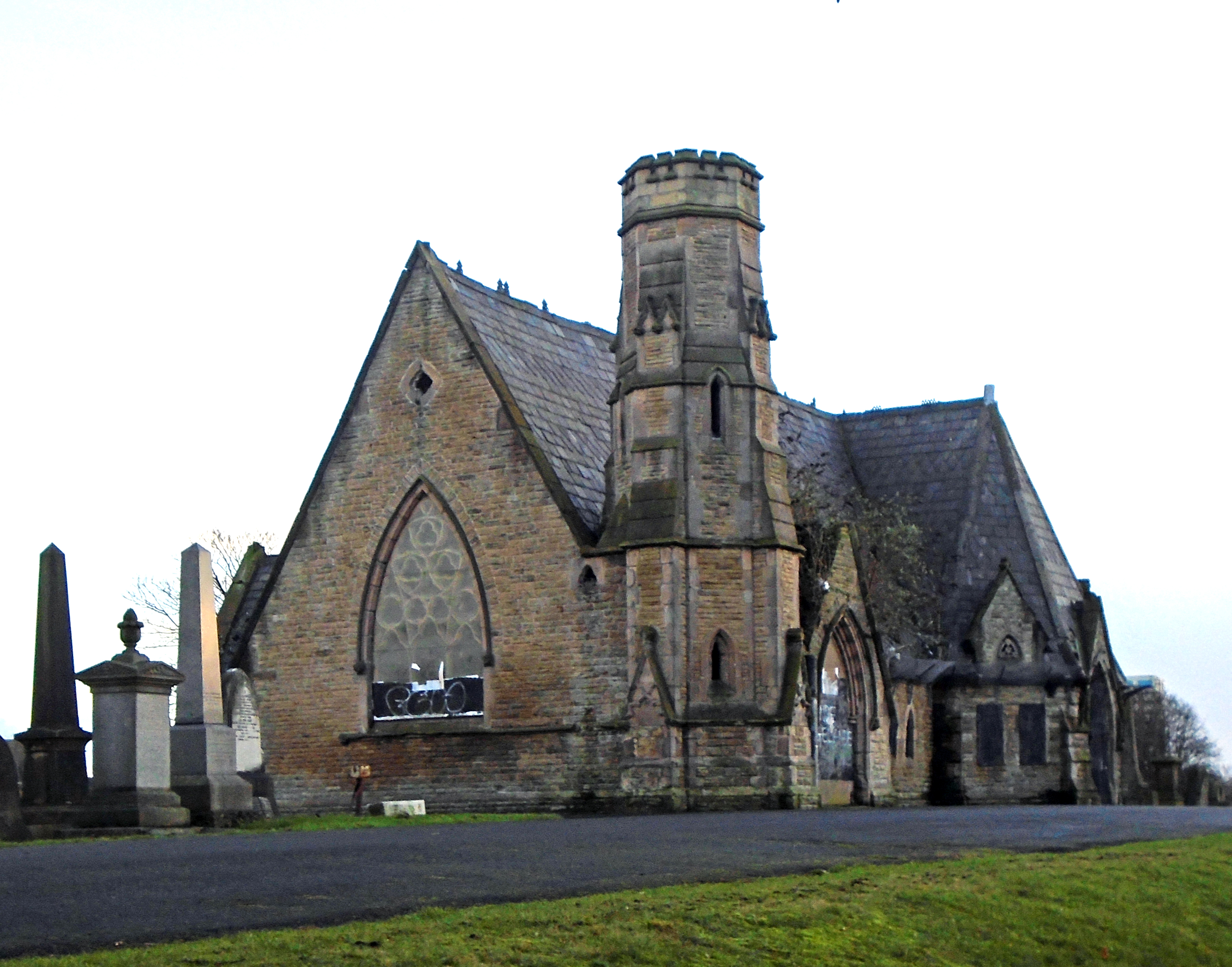
Former Anglican chapel

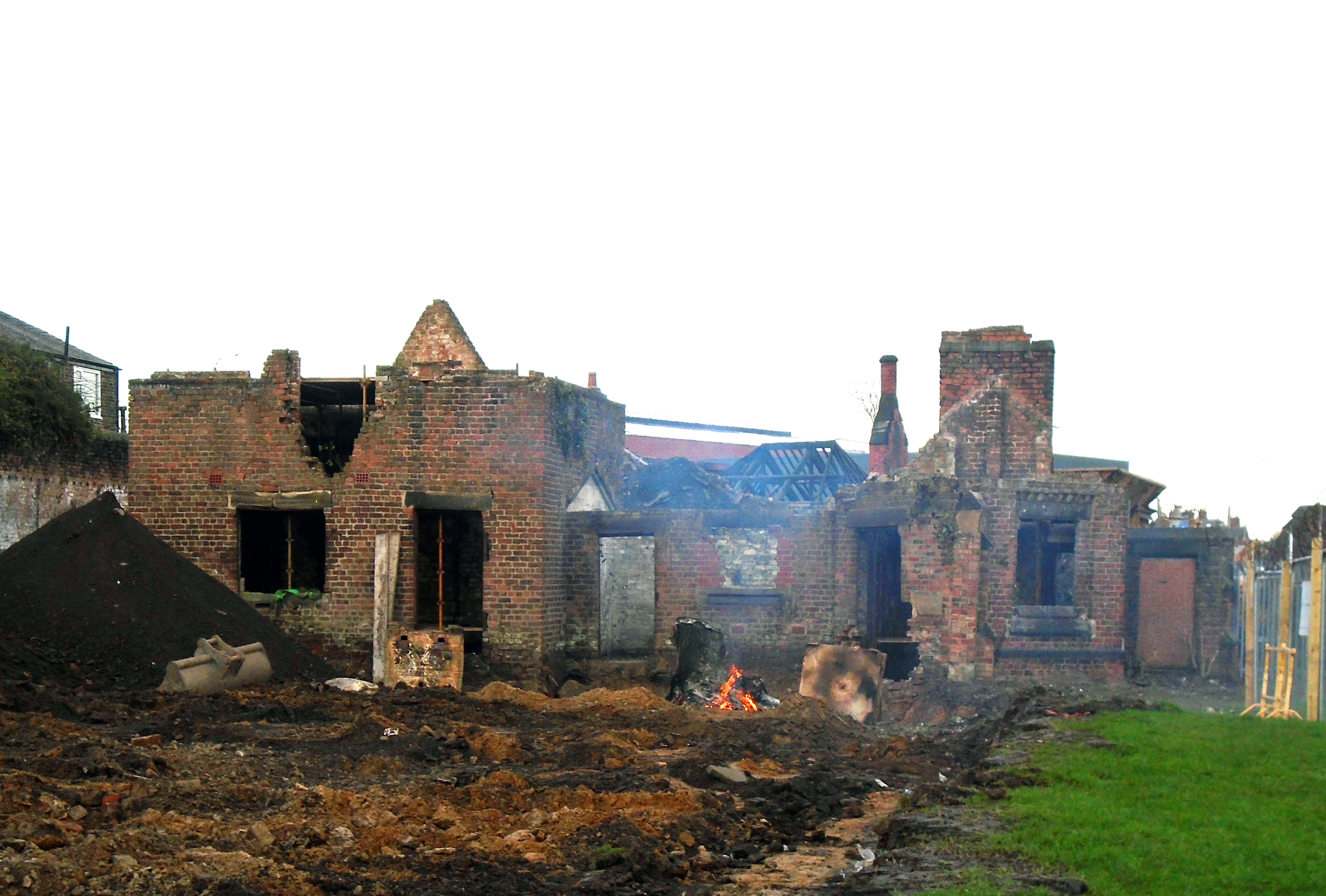
Former monumental mason's yard

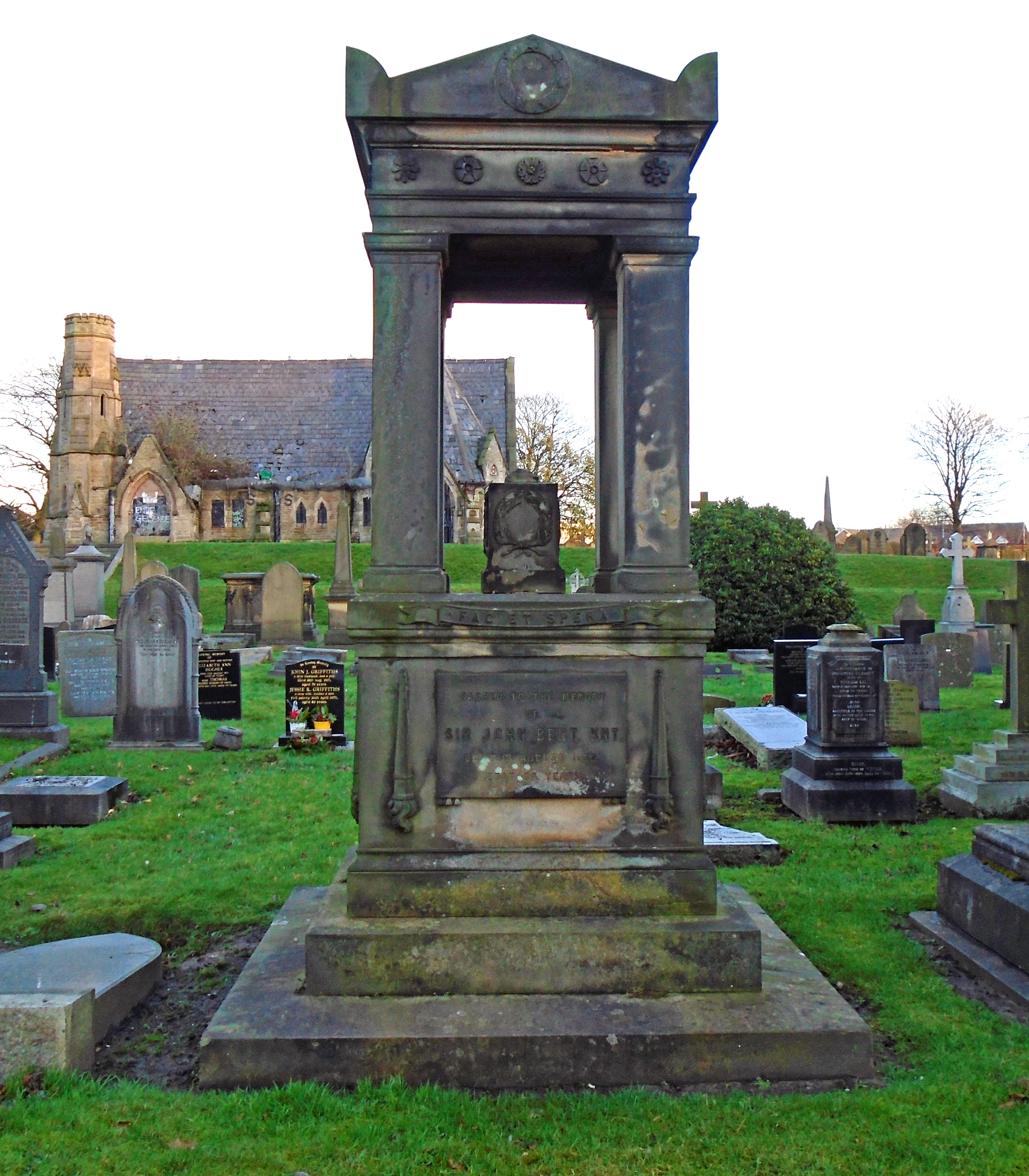
Sir John Bent, Mayor of Liverpool Borough

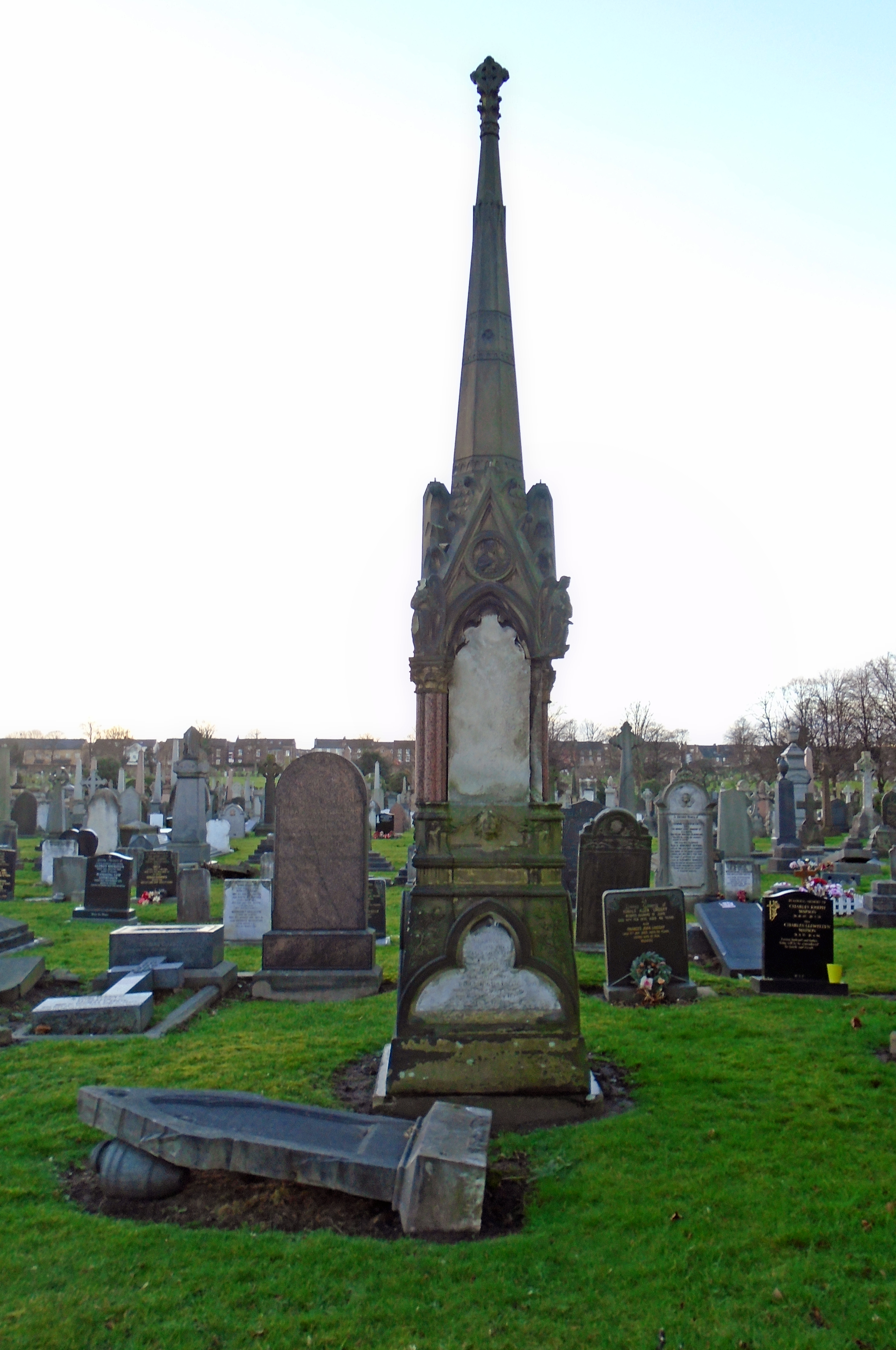
Eleanora and Willam Gillespie

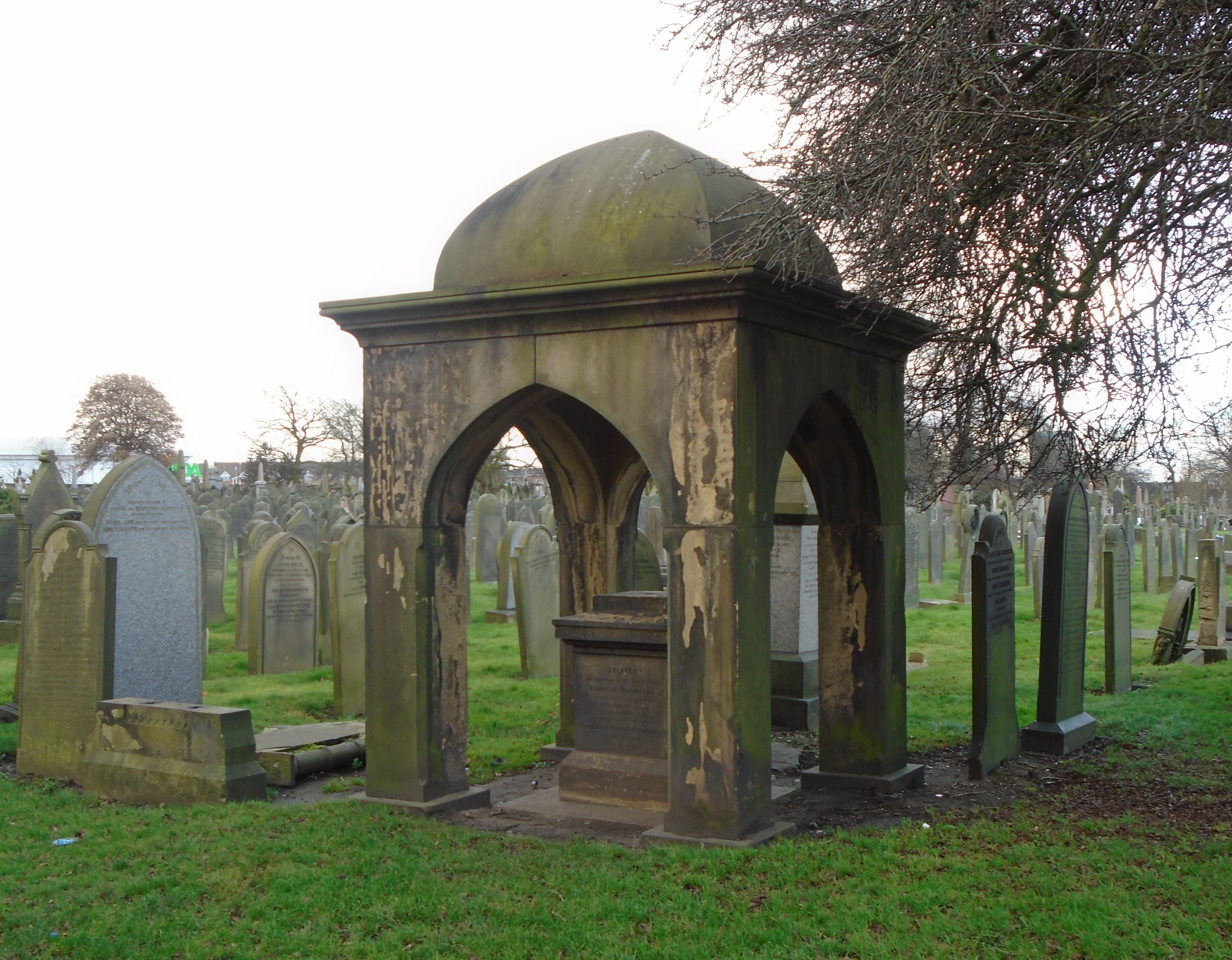
Hetherington family

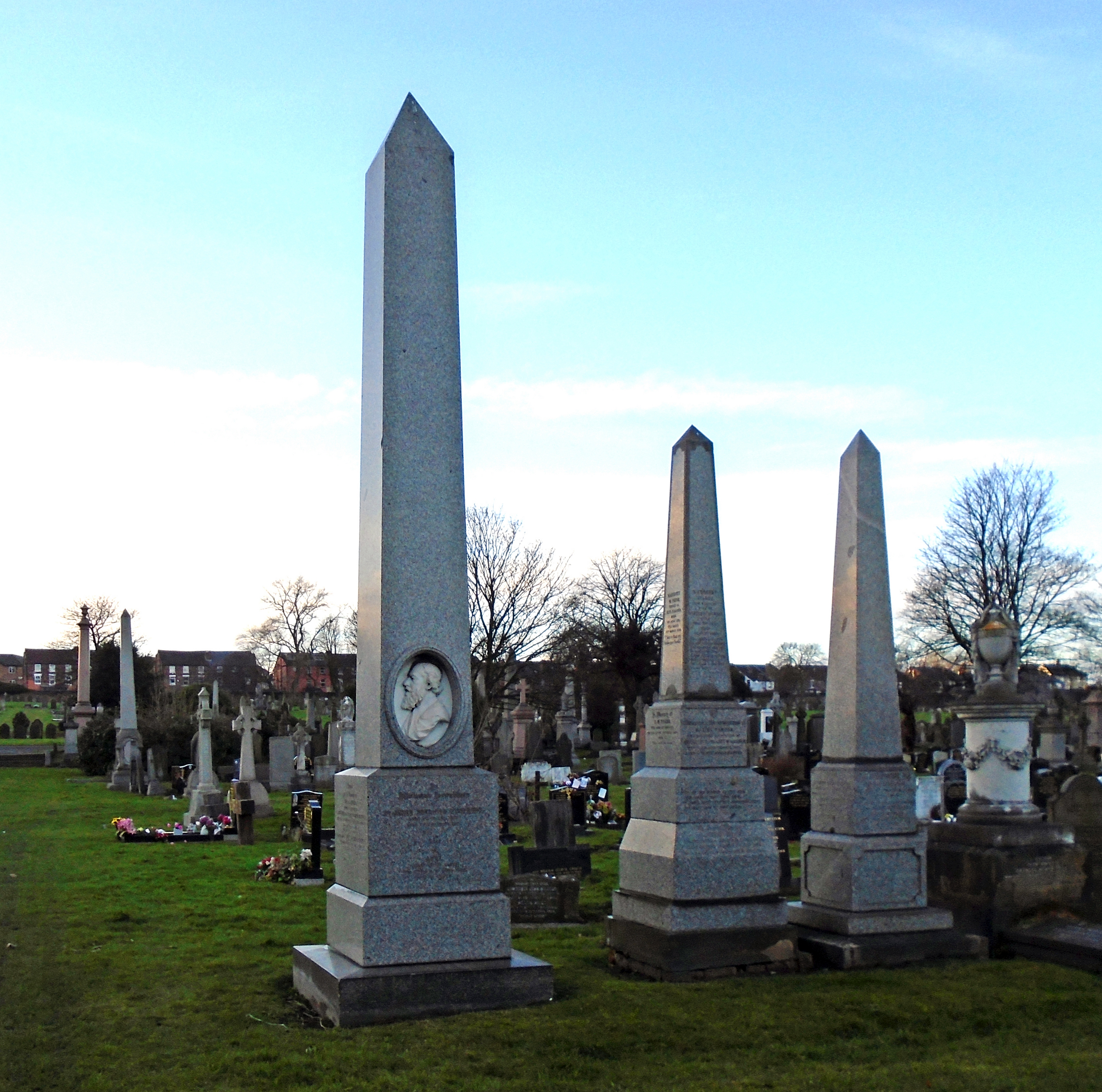
Dr James Sheridan Muspratt

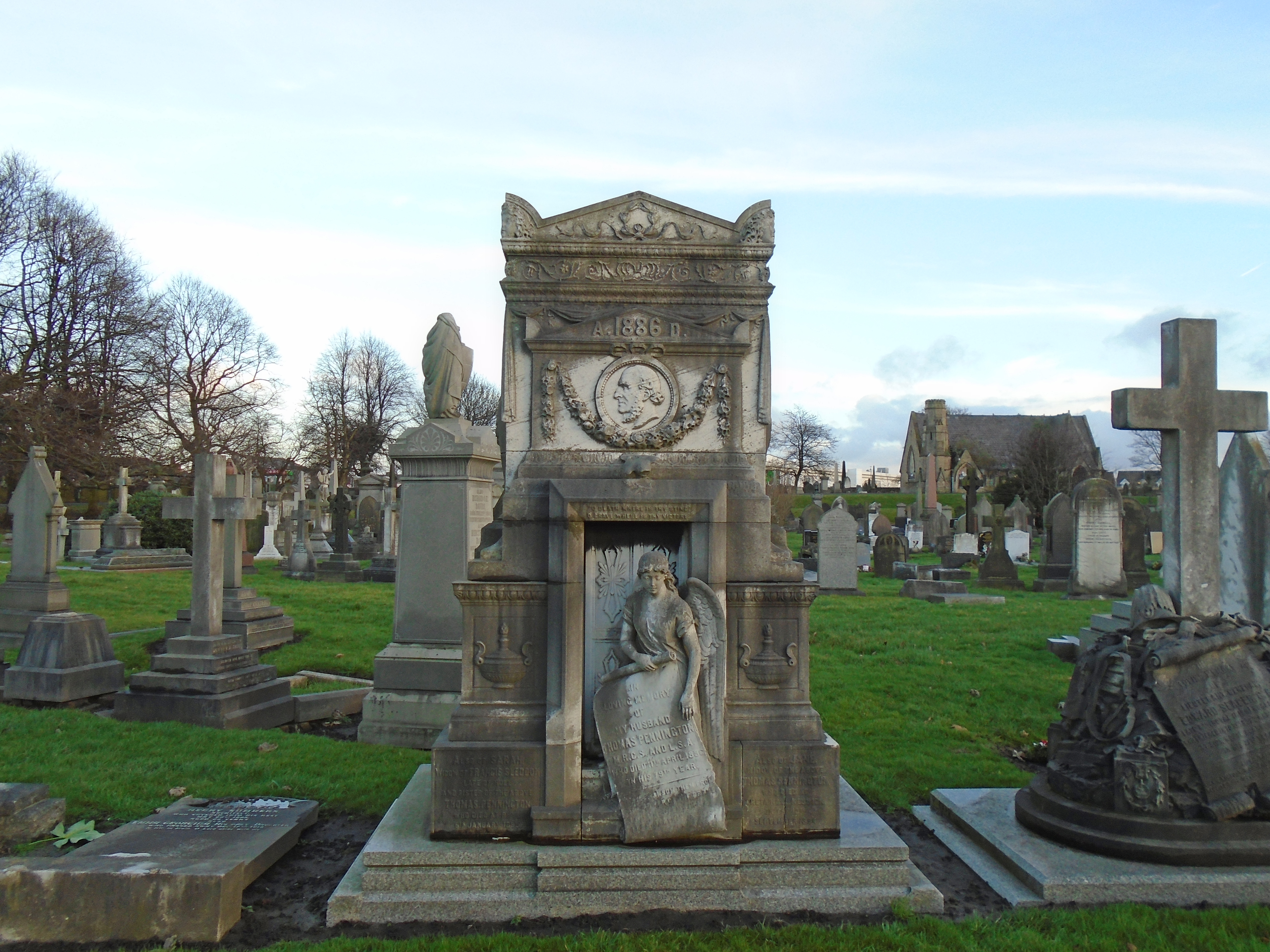
Thomas Pennington

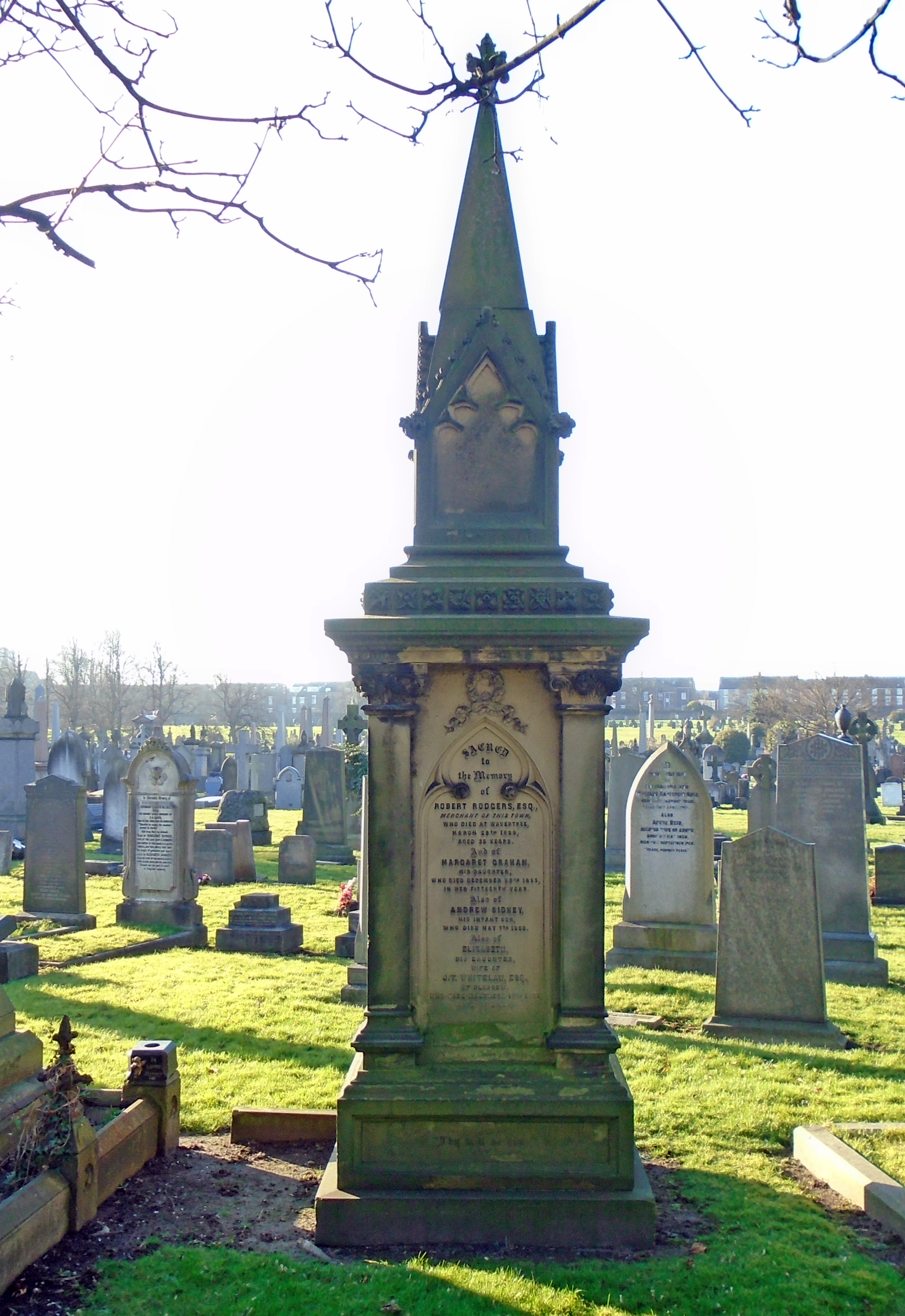
Robert Rodgers

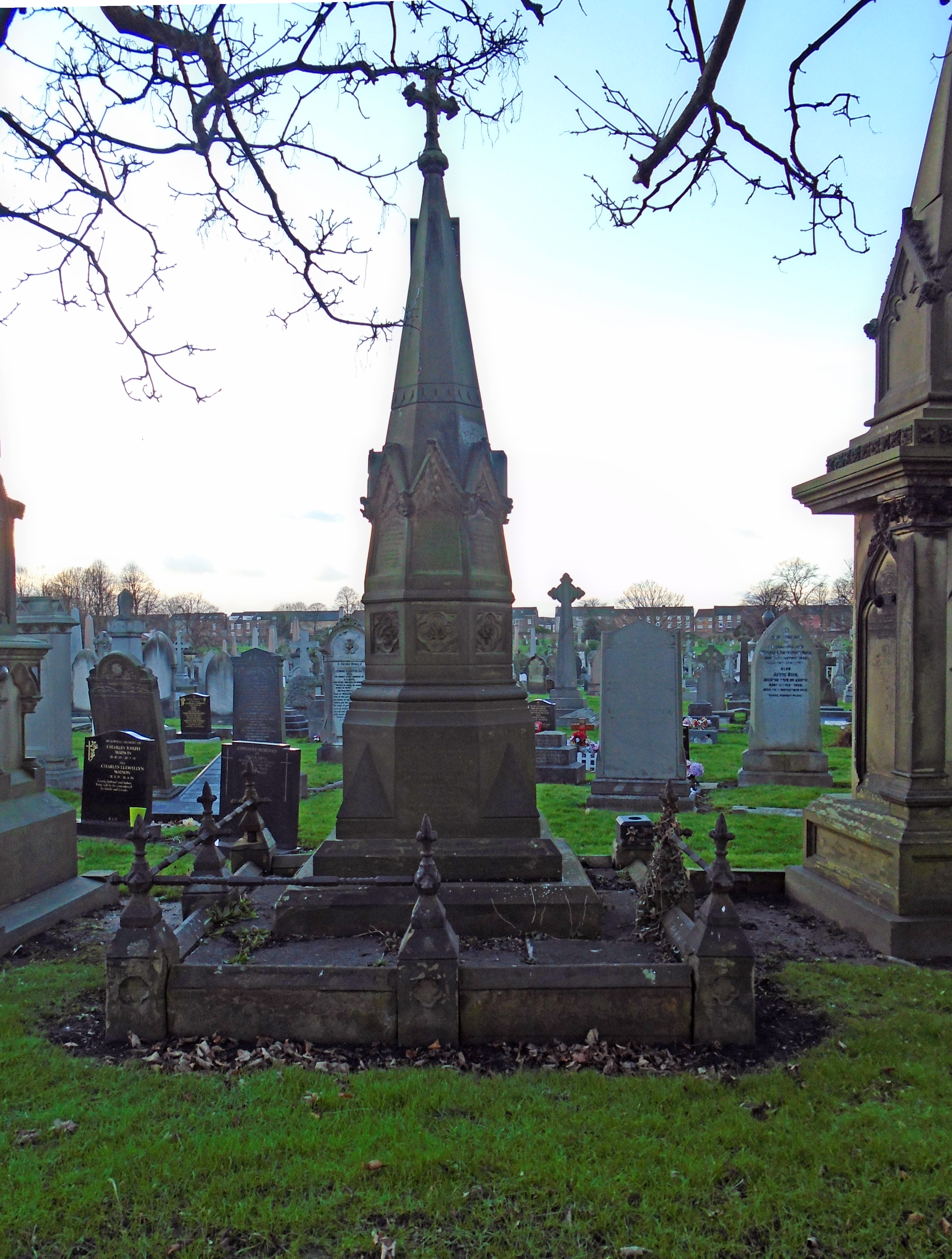
Agnes and John Rowe

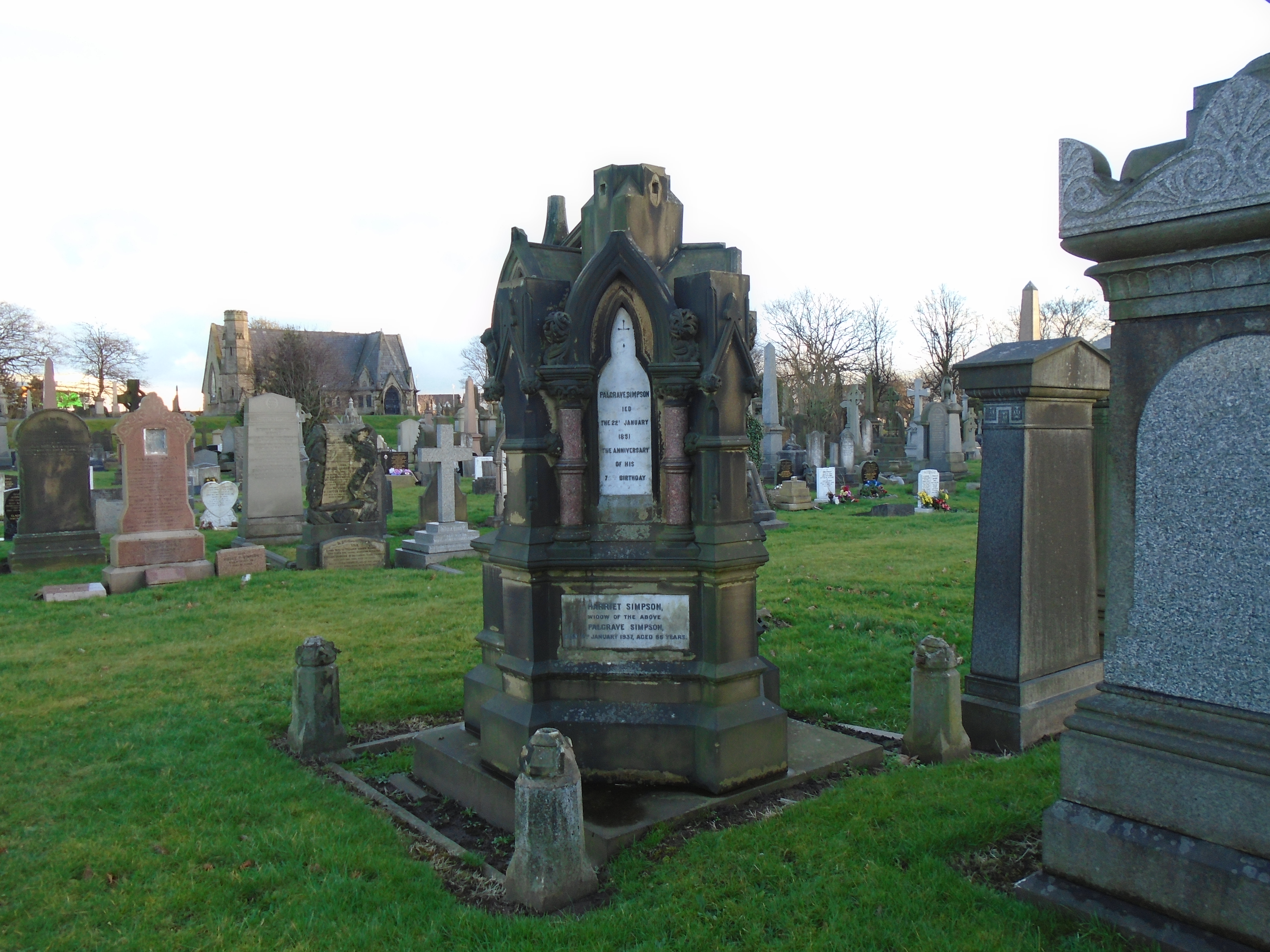
Patience Simpson

== War graves ==
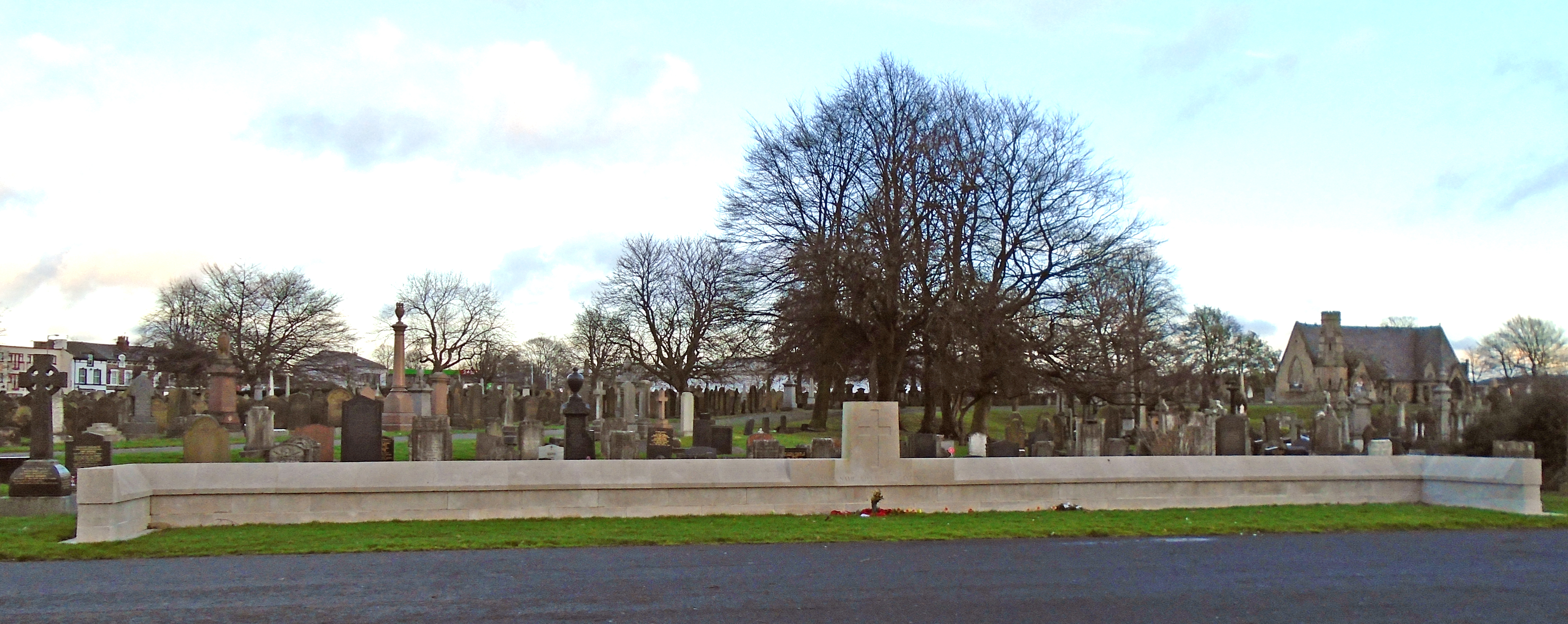
CWGC screen wall memorial

The cemetery contains the war graves of 274 Commonwealth service personnel, 227 from World War I and 45 from World War II. The largest group are in a war graves plot containing 69 graves, the names of those in the plot being listed on a Screen Wall curb memorial, while other graves are dispersed throughout the cemetery. Fifty of the British dead are soldiers of the King's Liverpool Regiment.

== John Hulley's grave ==
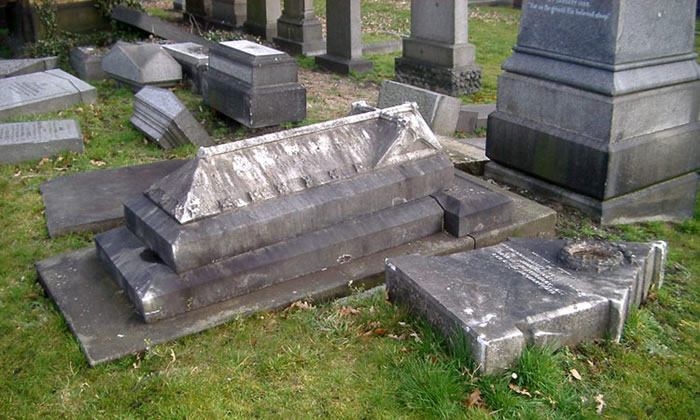
John Hulley's grave as found in February 2008

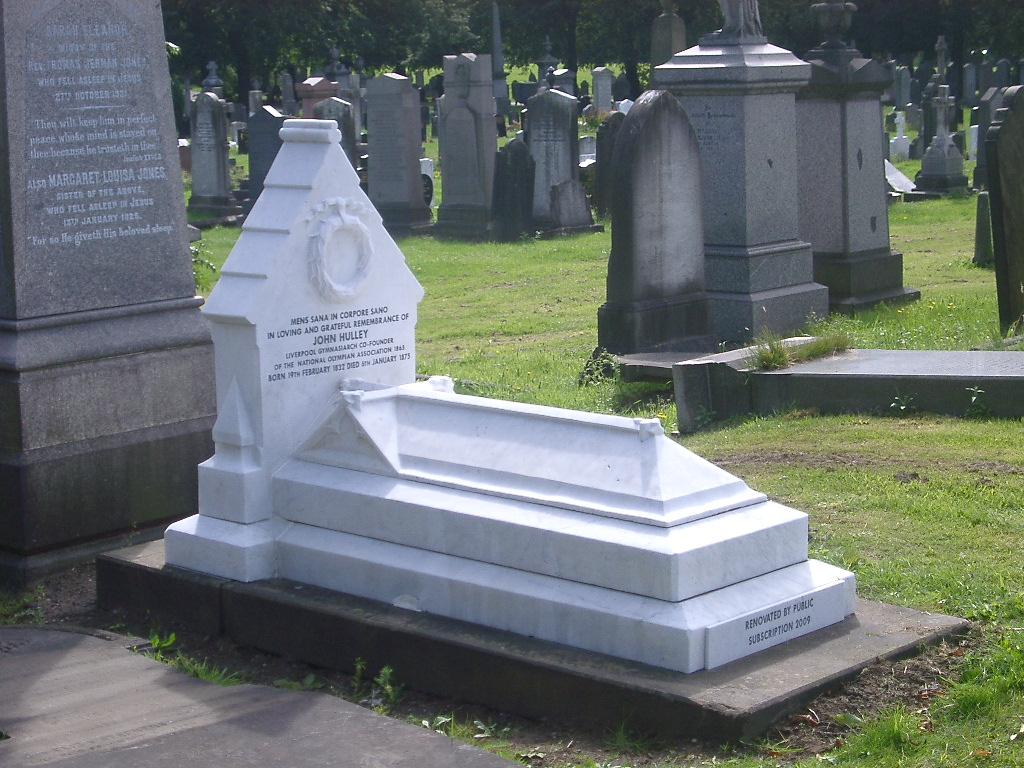
John Hulley's grave in June 2009 after renovation

Buried in the cemetery (Grave G493) is John Hulley, founder of the Liverpool Gymnasium and the National Olympian Association, who died in 1873. Revival of interest in his role in Olympic history was initiated by an article (2001) in the Journal of Olympic History entitled "The Mystery of John Hulley". Subsequently, his grave was rediscovered in 2008; it was badly damaged in that the headstone had been removed from the main covering stones and the grave was in a very bad condition from 130 years of atmospheric pollution.

A memorial fund was set up to raise money for the restoration of Hulley's grave and increase awareness of his part in the founding of the British Olympic movement. This took several months but thanks to generous donations from the International Olympic Committee, the British Olympic Association, and members of the public, sufficient funds were raised to engage a stonemason.

Messrs Welsbys of Liverpool renovated the grave and brought it back to its original condition and a re-dedication ceremony was held in 2009.

== Neighbours ==
At the eastern end of the high southern boundary wall, where the cemetery ends and the grounds of a supermarket, a medical clinic, and modern houses begin, the high wall continues but the style of brickwork can be seen to change; this area now occupied by the aforementioned modern buildings was previously the Toxteth Park Workhouse, which was built in 1859 by the Toxteth Park Board of Guardians as part of the West Derby Union. In 1923 the workhouse changed its name to the Smithdown Road Institution; in 1930 the Poor Law was abolished and the Union was disbanded, so the hospital was taken over by Liverpool Corporation. In 1933, its name was changed to Smithdown Road Infirmary, and in about 1950 its name was changed again, to Sefton General Hospital. Most of it was demolished in 2001 but a part of the original workhouse hospital, Arundel House, still stands.

== See also ==
- Toxteth, the Liverpool neighbourhood
- Burial Act 1857
