= Hulley =

Hulley is a surname. Notable people with the surname include:

- Angie Hulley (born 1962), British long-distance runner
- Annie Hulley (born 1955), English television and stage actress
- John Hulley (1832–1875), English gymnastics and athletics entrepreneur
- P. Alexander Hulley (born 1941), South African zoologist and ichthyologist

== See also ==
- Hulleys of Baslow trading name of Henry Hulley and Sons Ltd, a bus company based in Derbyshire, England
