= John Bent =

John Bent may refer to:

- John Bent (politician) (c. 1775–1848), English politician MP for Sligo Borough and Totnes
- John Bent (brewer) (1793–1857), English brewer and Mayor of Liverpool
- Johnny Bent (1908–2004), American hockey player

== See also ==
- Bent (surname)
