= Ernst Georg Ravenstein =

German-English geographer (1834–1913)

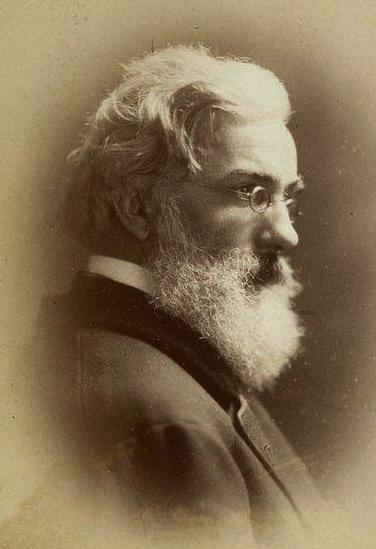
- Born: Ernst Georg Ravenstein; 30 December 1834; Frankfurt am Main
- Died: 13 March 1913 (aged 78); Taunus, German Empire
- Known for: Human migration (The Laws of Migration)
- Awards: Victoria gold medal of the Royal Geographical Society
- Scientific career
- Fields: Cartography, sociology, statistics
- Workplaces: Topographical department of the War Office (1855-1872); Professor of Geography at Bedford College, London (1882-1883)

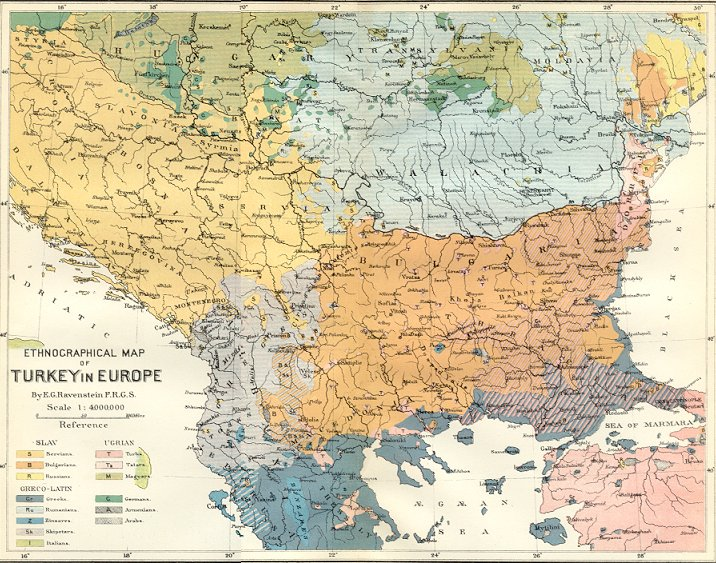
Ernst Ravestein's Ethnographical Map of Turkey in Europe

Ernst Georg Ravenstein (Ernest George) FRSGS (30 December 1834 – 13 March 1913) was a German-English geographer and cartographer. As a geographer he was less of a traveller than a researcher; his studies led mainly in the direction of cartography and the history of geography.

Ravenstein was born in Frankfurt am Main, Germany, to a family of cartographers. He spent most of his adult life in England in a house at Lorn Road, Lambeth, but he died in Germany, his country of birth, on 13 March 1913.

== Work on geography ==
When he was 18 years old he became a pupil of Dr. August Heinrich Petermann. After moving to England, Ravenstein became a naturalised British Subject and was in the service of the Topographical Department of the British War Office for 20 years, from 1855 to 1875. A long-serving member of the councils of the Royal Statistical and Royal Geographical Societies, he was also Professor of Geography at Bedford College in 1882–83. He was the first to receive the Victoria gold medal of the Royal Geographical Society (1902) for "his efforts during 40 years to introduce scientific methods into the cartography of the United Kingdom".

His geographical statistics and projections were respected and used as a basis for official planning at the time.

=== Printed works ===
His Systematic Atlas (1884) put into practice many of his ideas about methods of teaching cartography. The Philips's World Atlas was published with Ravenstein's plates and statistics for several decades. His Map of Equatorial Africa (1884) was the most notable map of a large part of the continent on a large scale that had been made up to that time, and he immediately developed it as new discoveries were made in Central and Eastern Africa.

Ravenstein also published:

- Vasco da Gama's First Voyage (1898)
- The Russians on the Amur (1861) (Full text can be found on Google Books).
- Handy Volume Atlas (1895; seventh edition, 1907)
- Martin Behaim. His Life and his Globe (1908)
- A Life's Work (1908)
- The New Census Physical, Pictorial, and Descriptive Atlas of the World (1911)
- Philips' Handy-Volume Atlas of the World containing seventy seven New and Specially Engraved Plates with Statistical Notes & Complete Index (Fourteenth edition, revised to date)
- History of cartography article for the 1911 Encyclopædia Britannica's "Map" entry.

=== Estimation of world population ===
In the late 19th century, he estimated the current world population at the time. He also moderately estimates a possible maximum World population that can be sustained by Earth's resources, in the year 2072.

Commenting on Ravenstein's paper on overpopulation presented at the British Association, the Times, stated that Ravenstein "estimates the population of the world for the present year at 1,468,000,000, and, after making careful allowance for various unfavourable circumstances, he comes to the comforting conclusion that the human race may increase to the number of 5,994,000,000 without outrunning the supply of food". Based on an 8 percent increase of population per decade, "the limit of expansion will be reached in 182 years". "He had estimated the world's population for the present year to be 1,468,000,000. He found that the population of the world every 10 years increased 8 percent. The Total population of the cultivable area would be 5,850,700,000, and the total number which the earth could feed was 5,994,000,000 people".

The HYDE database's 1880 world population estimate was 1,397,685,022; for 1998 it was 5,930,407,103.

Ravenstein though treated his estimation with indifference and a calm manner. "We fear that we have been seduced into something like levity by the fact that Mr Ravenstein himself does not appear to have been materially shocked and saddened by his own conclusions. Indeed, his closing words indicate a strange spirit of indifference, not to say callousness. So far as we ourselves were concerned, he did not think we need make such a tremendous fuss about it, knowing we would not live to see the day when there was no more room on this earth."

=== Theory of migration ===
He established a theory of human migration in the 1880s that still forms the basis for modern migration theory.

The following was a standard list after Ravenstein's (1834–1913) proposal in the 1880s. The theories are as follows:

1. Every migration flow generates a return or counter-migration.
2. The majority of migrants move a short distance.
3. Migrants who move longer distances tend to choose major sources of economic activity.
4. Urban residents are often less migratory than inhabitants of rural areas.
5. Families are less likely to make international moves than young adults.
6. Most migrants are adults.
7. Large towns grow by migration rather than natural population growth.
8. More long distance migrants are male.
9. More long distance migrants are adult individuals rather than families with children.

In his book 'Laws of Migration', Ravenstein explained his theory of step migration which sees that migration could be gradual and often occurred step by step geographically.

== Work on gymnastics ==
In 1861, Ravenstein established the German Gymnastics Society, a sporting association, in London. It promoted gymnastics and held annual athletic competitions, at a purpose-built German Gymnasium in St Pancras, and at The Crystal Palace. By 1866, the society had 1,100 members, drawn from more than 30 nationalities, with 650 members being Britons, mostly tradesmen. With William Penny Brookes and John Hulley, he was a founder member of the National Olympian Association in 1865, which promoted an annual series of sporting events across the country, inspired by the Olympic Games of Much Wenlock. He published a handbook on gymnastics in 1867.
