= John Hulley =

English gymnastics and athletics entrepreneur

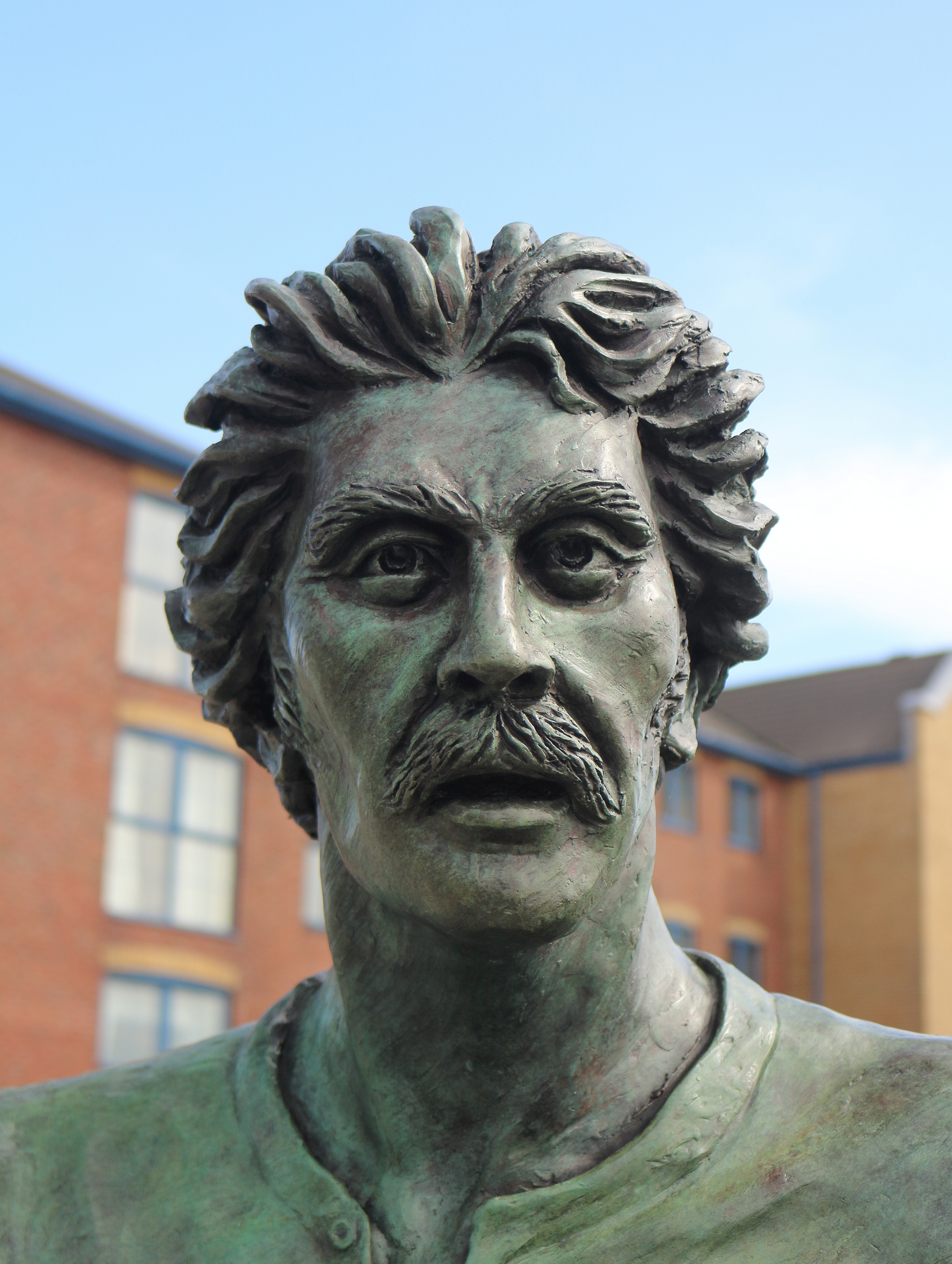
- Head of Hulley, from the statue on Liverpool Waterfront
- Born: John Hulley; 19 February 1832; 10 Gloucester Street, Liverpool, United Kingdom
- Died: 6 January 1875 (aged 42); 91 Grove Street, Liverpool, United Kingdom
- Resting place: Grave G493, Toxteth Park Cemetery
- Education: Louis Huguenin's school, Liverpool; Matriculation at the Collegiate Institute, Liverpool
- Occupations: Honorary Secretary of the Liverpool Athletic Club; Director of the Rotunda Gymnasium; Manager of the New Liverpool Gymnasium; Vice-President and Honorary Secretary of the Athletic Society; Honorary Member of the Wenlock Olympian Society; Director of the Liverpool Gymnasium; Chairman of the National Olympian Association; Gymnasiarch of Liverpool.
- Known for: Encouraging public participation in physical education to improve health and well-being; establishing the National Olympian Association; with William Penny Brooks and Ernst Ravenstein, organising the first National Olympian Games; exposing the Davenport Brothers; introducing the Velocipede into Liverpool

John Hulley (19 February 1832 – 6 January 1875) was an English gymnastics and athletics entrepreneur who encouraged public participation in physical education to improve health and well-being, and was one of the instigators of the Olympic movement in Britain. At his Liverpool Gymnasium in 1865 he established the National Olympian Association, the forerunner of the British Olympic Association. With William Penny Brookes and Ernst Georg Ravenstein, he organised the first National Olympian Games in 1866. He organised a series of Assault-at-Arms gymnastic events in Liverpool and Manchester. He organised six Olympic Festivals between 1862 and 1867 in Liverpool and Llandudno. With Robert B. Cummins, he exposed American magicians the Davenport brothers. He introduced the velocipede into Liverpool.

== Early life ==
John Hulley was born on 19 February 1832 at 10 Gloucester Street, Liverpool, Lancashire, the only son of John Nevitt Hulley (1803–1840) surgeon, and his wife Elizabeth Speed of Overton, Flintshire (1799–1890). He was baptised at St David's Church, Brownlow Hill, Liverpool on 19 July 1832. His four uncles, grandfather and great grandfather were all in the medical profession. His ancestors came from Frodsham and previously Rainow in Cheshire.

From an early age Hulley had a keen interest in physical activities, education and fitness. He was taught by Louis Huguenin, the famous French gymnast who had settled in Liverpool in 1844 as a teacher of Gymnastics. John attended Huguenin's school in a court at the top of Lord Street for several years before matriculating from the Collegiate Institute, Shaw Street, Liverpool in 1850. John was destined to succeed his teacher and became the uncrowned king of the local gymnasts.

== Vocation in physical education ==
In January 1858 Charles Pierre Melly, a Liverpool philanthropist (an ancestor of George Melly, musician and entertainer, and Andrée Melly film actress) applied to purchase a piece of corporation land for the purpose of transforming it into a free recreative ground, and fitting it up with a gymnasium and other appliances for the use of the local working-class people. With John Hulley, he founded the Liverpool Athletic Club at the Rotunda Gymnasium, Bold Street, Liverpool (with the motto mens sana in corpore sano – a healthy mind in a healthy body), and was its first president.

Hulley's first public speech on the role of physical education was given on 25 April 1861 at the Theatre Royal, Williamson Square, Liverpool and was part of a display by members of the 79th Lancashire Volunteer Rifles entitled "A Grand Assault of Arms". Several members of the Manchester Athenaeum Gymnastic Club and of M. Huguenin's Liverpool Gymnasium performed a great variety of gymnastic exercises. Another Assault-at-Arms was held at the same venue in December 1861, where Hulley delivered an address on physical education in which he stressed the need for physical as well as mental excellence.

== Olympic Festivals ==
The 1st Grand Olympic Festival was held at Mount Vernon Parade Ground, Liverpool in June 1862 and John Hulley, Honorary Secretary of the club organised the event. The Liverpool Mercury reported that Hulley was praised by Mr. Melly who said that "it was entirely owing to John Hulley's indefatigable and praiseworthy exertions that the festival had been brought to such a successful and highly satisfactory issue". The Mercury's report also acknowledged the work of John Hulley in making a success of the festival.

An Assault-at-Arms was held at St. George's Hall, Liverpool in December 1862, again organised by Hulley. This was followed by the 2nd Olympic Festival held on 13 June 1863 at the Mount Vernon Parade Ground, Liverpool in front of 12,000 to 15,000 spectators. A Grand Assault-at-Arms held at the Theatre Royal, Liverpool by the Liverpool Athletic Society on 2 December 1863 was the occasion when the prizes won at the Olympic Festival in June were distributed to the winners.

The 3rd Olympic Festival took place in the Zoological Gardens on 9 July 1864, having been postponed from a week earlier due to bad weather, and was formally opened by Sir John Jones. In his address he said inter alia "I am sure you will excuse me if I bring to your notice the name of an individual who has exerted himself on behalf of the Athletic Club in a manner not to be exceeded – I mean Mr. John Hulley. (Loud cheers.) You are indebted to him for the club which has been established at Liverpool; you are indebted to him for these festivals, and as far as my knowledge goes, the most indefatigable exertions for the promotion of physical education have been displayed by him". (Cheers.)

The Foundation stone of the new Liverpool Gymnasium was officially laid on 19 July 1864 in Myrtle Street by the Mayor, with Hulley as manager and self-styled Gymnasiarch (an Athenian officer who superintended the gymnasia). Mr. C.P. Melly addressed the invited guests and explained that judging from the success of the Rotunda Gymnasium, and the large receipts from its subscribers during its short career, it was believed that if the services of Mr. Hulley could be secured then an institution might be founded which would be not only of benefit to the public, but also to those who gave their money to it.

In 1864 Hulley had the time and inclination to write to The Times suggesting that England should adopt a type of bathing dress used by continentals – "Gentlemen, wives and daughters walking down to the water were all dressed in a seemly yet convenient fashion. The men wear simply loose, baggy trousers, and a skirted Garibaldi of the same or corresponding material. The ladies wear what may be described as a simple Bloomer costume, consisting of jackets, shaped variously according to taste and loose trousers reaching to the ankle. The dress is completed by slippers, to protect the feet from the shingle, and a straw hat, neatly trimmed to protect the fair wearer's complexion".

Hulley's prowess in the field of physical education was formally recognised by the Wenlock Olympian Society in October 1864 when they elected him to honorary membership and awarded him a silver medal as a mark of their appreciation of his talented and valuable services in the cause of physical education.

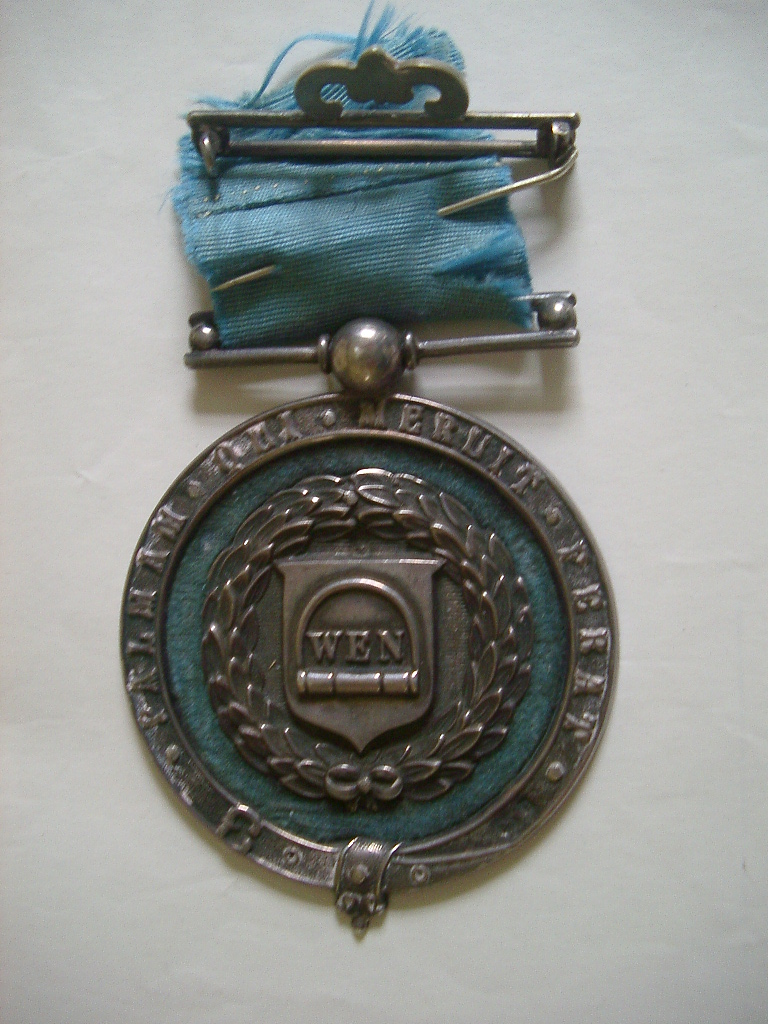
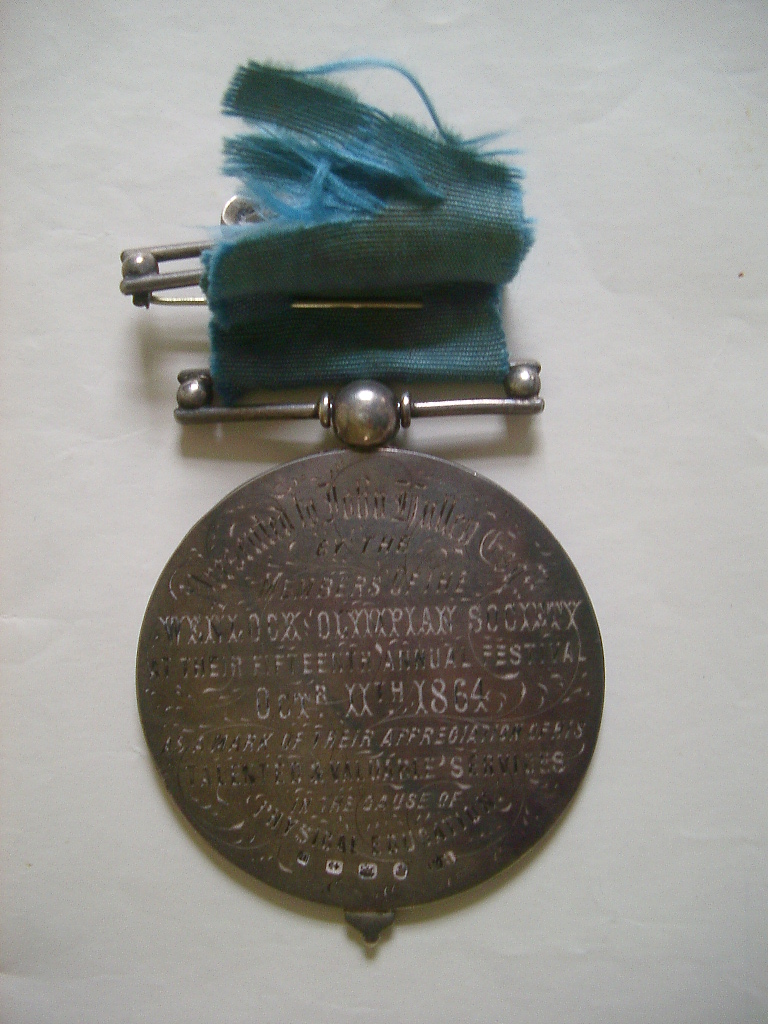
Hulley's Wenlock Olympian Society Silver Medal. Inscribed: "Presented to John Hulley Esqre by the Members of the WENLOCK OLYMPIAN SOCIETY at their Fifteenth Annual Festival Octr. XXth 1864 as a mark of their appreciation of his TALENTED & VALUABLE SERVICES in the cause of PHYSICAL EDUCATION"

The medal was rediscovered in 2008 in an attic in Wallasey by a descendant of Georgiana Hulley, née Bolton, the wife of John Hulley.

The 4th Olympic Festival was held outside Liverpool for the first time, at Llandudno on Saturday 22 and Monday 24 July 1865 at the Croquet Ground above the baths. Hulley again organised the festival which included an athletic meeting held on the side of the Great Orme and a Grand Procession of Illuminated Boats on the Bay. Unfortunately this had to be postponed from the Saturday evening to the Monday due to the Llandudno boatmen re-hiring their boats to someone else after a price had been agreed with Hulley. At the end of the festival Hulley was thanked and three cheers were heartily given by the crowd. The following week's edition of the North Wales Chronicle appealed to the organisers to organise another athletic meeting.

The Liverpool Gymnasium was formally opened on 6 November 1865 by Lord Stanley, who said "I congratulate the managers upon having in Mr Hulley, a director who is working out a very real and enthusiastic interest in the business which he is employed to do".

On the same day at the Liverpool Gymnasium Hulley took the Chair on the formation of the National Olympian Association (NOA) and the Liverpool Mercury reported the inaugural meeting with the following persons present:

Mr. John Hulley of Liverpool; Chairman;
Dr. W. P. Brookes, Wenlock Olympian Society (founded 1850);
Mr. E.G. Ravenstein, president of the German Gymnastic Society, London;
Mr. William Mitchell, Fearness Hall, near Manchester;
Mr. Keeling, Liverpool;
Mr. Murray, London;
Mr. Phillips, Shrewsbury;
Mr Ambrose Lee, Manchester;
Mons. Durbec, Paris.

This meeting was the forerunner of the modern British Olympic Association and was formed mainly through the efforts of Hulley, Dr. Brookes and Mr Ravenstein – the triumvirate of the 19th century Olympic movement. The NOA's articles of foundation provided the framework for the Olympic Charter.

The traditional winter Assault-at-Arms was held at the Liverpool Gymnasium on 8 February 1866 under the auspices of Hulley, with Sir John Jones KCB, hero of Delhi and late President of the Athletic Society in the chair. A large audience was entertained by several gymnastic performances, broadsword and fencing contests, and boxing bouts, one of which featured Jem Mace the current English boxing champion. All proceeds were donated to the Children's Hospital in Liverpool.

The 5th Olympic Festival was again held at Llandudno on 25–26 June 1866. John Hulley followed this event by organising a swimming fete for juveniles at the same venue on 27 July 1866. During his stay at Llandudno he revisited his views concerning the modes of bathing attire for males and females. He addressed a large gathering on the Parade and spoke about the need for British holiday resorts to follow the lead of those on the continent in the matter of dress. His main theme was simply that there were two things to be done before British bathing will be as decent, as moral, as enjoyable, as bathing on the continent. The first was to get men and women to wear decent bathing dresses; and the second was, to induce them to be in company. At the close of his address, discussion was invited, but, with the exception of two gentlemen who spoke in favour of Mr Hulley's views, no discussion was entered upon. The question was then put to the meeting whether the views advocated were such as met the approval of those present, and was carried unanimously. His speech was reported in the Pall Mall Gazette of 7 September 1866.

Hulley, with help from William Penny Brookes and Ernst Ravenstein, staged Britain's first National Olympian Games held on 31 July 1866 by the River Thames at Teddington for aquatic events and 1 August 1866 at the Crystal Palace Park Cricket Ground for other events. John Hulley's presence at the Games and mode of dress drew considerable attention and a report in the Penny Illustrated Paper mentioned:

A turbaned gentleman, attired in the garb of a Turk was supposed to represent the East at the Olympian Festival, but the fancifully-dressed one turned out to be the Gymnasiarch of Liverpool, John Hulley, and whom no more gorgeously apparelled.

The Liverpool Gymnasium reopened for the winter season on Monday 10 September 1866 after a 2-month break. During this period Hulley had spent time on the continent visiting the principal gymnasia there. In March 1867, he was called upon to advise Sir Philip Egerton and Mr. Reginald Cholmondeley, representatives of the famous public school at Rugby on the erection of a new gymnasium.

In planning for the forthcoming Olympic Festival in Liverpool, Hulley drew attention to his decision that all the contests would be open to amateurs only. He had taken the most stringent precautions that not only the "professional" but the "semi-professional" element would be strictly excluded and it was among these classes that disputes and disturbances most frequently arose. This could possibly be the first occasion in which the differences between professional and amateur sportsmen came into the public arena.

The 6th Olympic Festival was held on 28 June 1867 at the Myrtle Street gymnasium, continued on 29 June at the Sheil Park Athletic Grounds, Liverpool. John Hulley gave a long speech at the former venue and offered this advice:

What I desire to impress upon you is that Olympic festivals are not the end of physical education. Physical education, or rather its dissemination, is the end. Olympic festivals are the means of securing that end. They must be judged by their after effect, not their immediate results. They are evidence of the good done, but not the whole evidence.

It appears that Hulley, now President of the Athletic Society, took a back seat in the organisation of this event because of the report which included "and the programme was got through very shortly after the appointed time, and this act of itself testifies to the completeness of the arrangements. A better managed Olympic festival has not been held in Liverpool; and this is in great measure due to the exertions of Messrs J.B. Lee and W. D. Hogarth, who, after winning many laurels in the ranks as competitors, this year appeared in the character of joint honorary secretaries."

On 29 August 1867 Hulley and others responded to a request from the Llandudno townsfolk by organising another Grand Carnival. During the day, as the programme has it, "in order to restore a light on the evening’s amusements, a bazaar for the sale of Chinese lanterns was extemporised on the parade." At a little after 8 pm, a grand procession of boats, illuminated all over – rigging them astern – with lanterns and coloured fire, was started from the landings steps.

A Handbook of Gymnastics And Athletics by E. G. Ravenstein, F.R.G.S., &c, President of the German Gymnastic Society, London; and John Hulley, Gymnasiarch of Liverpool was published in 1867 by Trübner & Co., London. A review of this book concluded that "it will merit a place as a standard volume in the library of every English gentleman, and in every school and college throughout the land".

A Grand Assault at Arms was again held at the Liverpool Gymnasium, Myrtle Street, on 28 March 1868 under the direction of Hulley and a large audience of spectators witnessed an excellent programme of exercises by the gymnasts. During an interval in the proceedings, diplomas were presented to successful competitors by the Mayor.

Hulley was a patron of the Mercantile Assistants' Athletic Festival which took place at Spekeland Park, Smithdown Lane, Liverpool on 11 July 1868. There was no mention of him in the subsequent report, and compared with his organising abilities in previous athletic festivals, this event was a very small one and appeared to signal the end of his involvement in athletic festivals in Liverpool.

== Velocipede and bicycle races ==
1869 commenced with England being enthralled with the new-fangled velocipede. In January, Hulley immediately recognised the commercial potential of it in relation to exercises and gymnastics, and contacted several of the principle velocipede makers in Paris, New York and elsewhere. He eventually procured a velocipede from Paris and organised a "Velocipede Club" at the Liverpool Gymnasium. On 22 May 1869 a number of bicycle races were held at the racecourse at Hoylake. 1000 persons watched the events, which was organised by a committee including John Hulley.

== Criticism of John Hulley? ==
The general reputation of Hulley in the latter years of the 1860s appears to have lessened, but the reasons why are unclear. An article in the Cheshire Observer and Chester, Birkenhead, Crewe and North Wales Times of 1 May 1869, may give an indication of the view of the local press towards him, although his work regarding the health and welfare of the lower classes would have still been positive. The unknown author had attended a Bicycle Tournament at the Liverpool Gymnasium and had scornfully compared it with the performances of Music Hall acrobats. He went on to criticise Hulley as "one of the most, it not the most unpopular man in the town, though whether that is his fault or his misfortune is not for me to determine". He acknowledged that Hulley was undoubtedly a public benefactor, but went on to suggest that everyone in Liverpool was familiar "with his grotesque figure" and his hair reminded him of the waves in The Tempest.

== Exposure of the Davenport brothers ==
Hulley and a colleague called Robert B. Cummins were at the centre of the exposure of two visiting American magicians – the Davenport brothers – who tried to deceive audiences in 1865 with an escape from an allegedly escape-proof cabinet. This and the resultant court case attracted widespread coverage by the national press and the brothers were sued for the return of money paid to witness a séance, which did not take place. They were found guilty and had to refund all admission money.

== Marriage ==
On 16 July 1869 at the Ancient Unitarian Chapel, Toxteth Park, Hulley married Georgiana Bolton, only daughter of Mr. Robert Lewin Bolton, merchant of Liverpool and granddaughter of Thomas Bolton who was Mayor of Liverpool in 1840. The marriage was an explosive affair: the father by some means had learnt of the proposed nuptials, and at once put in force parental authority to prevent its being carried out to its full fruition. The means taken for this purpose were of the most effectual character. The lady was locked in her chamber, and to all her entreaties "the father was flint and the mother was stone". However, love prevailed in the face of adversity and thanks to assistance by friends, the couple married a day later. This attracted widespread press coverage throughout the country and several reports of the on-off-on marriage filled the columns of many newspapers for several days after the event. A daughter, Georgiana Theodosis, was born in Liverpool in December 1870.

== Death ==
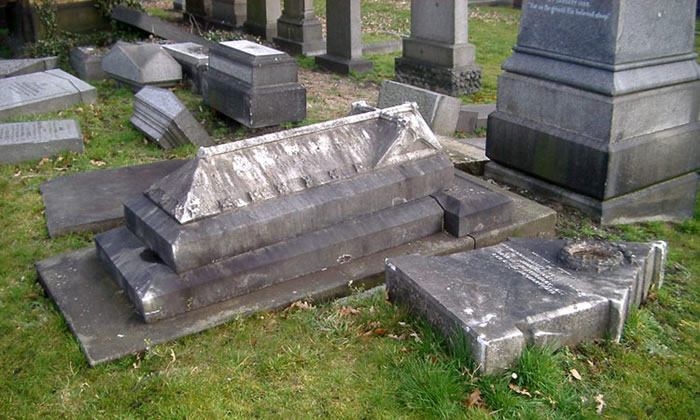
John Hulley's grave as found in February 2008

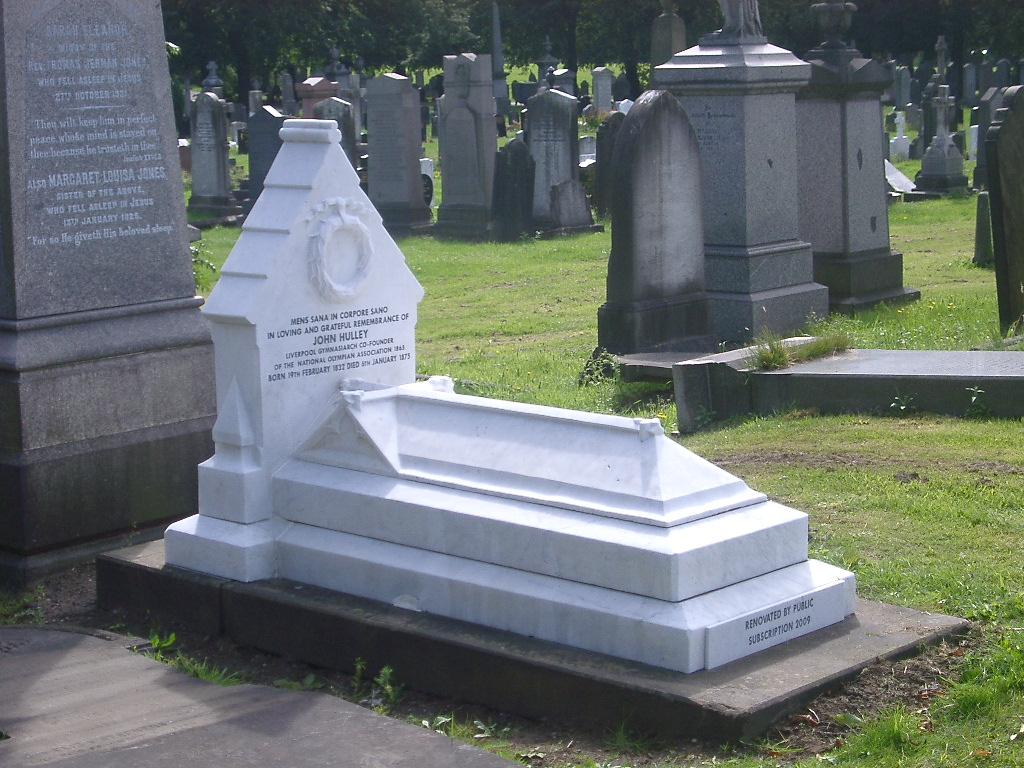
John Hulley's grave in June 2009 after renovation

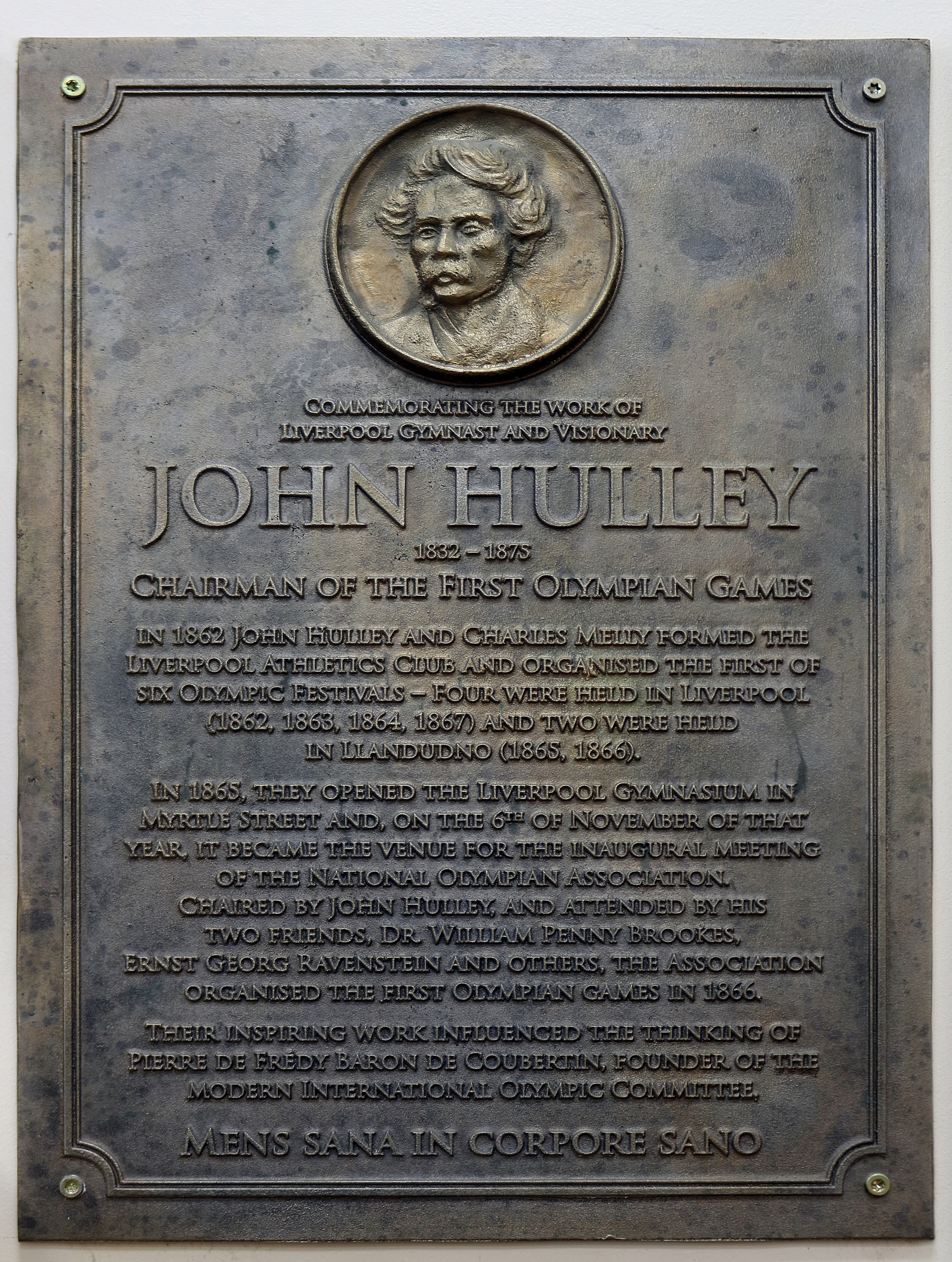
The plaque at the gym in Lifestyles Park Road Sports Centre Liverpool.

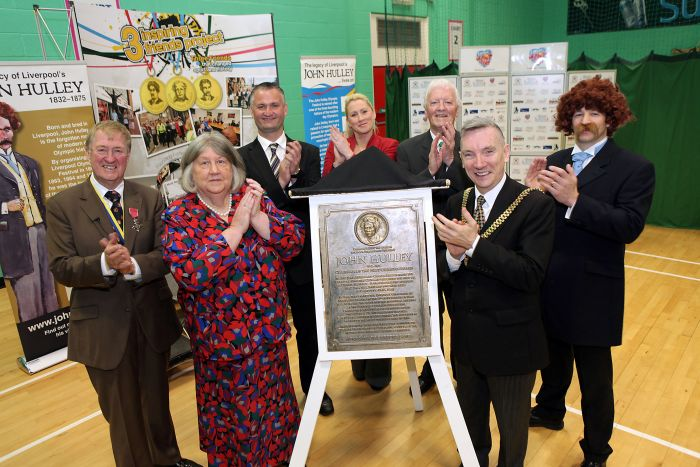
Unveiling ceremony at the Lifestyles Park Road Sports Centre Liverpool.

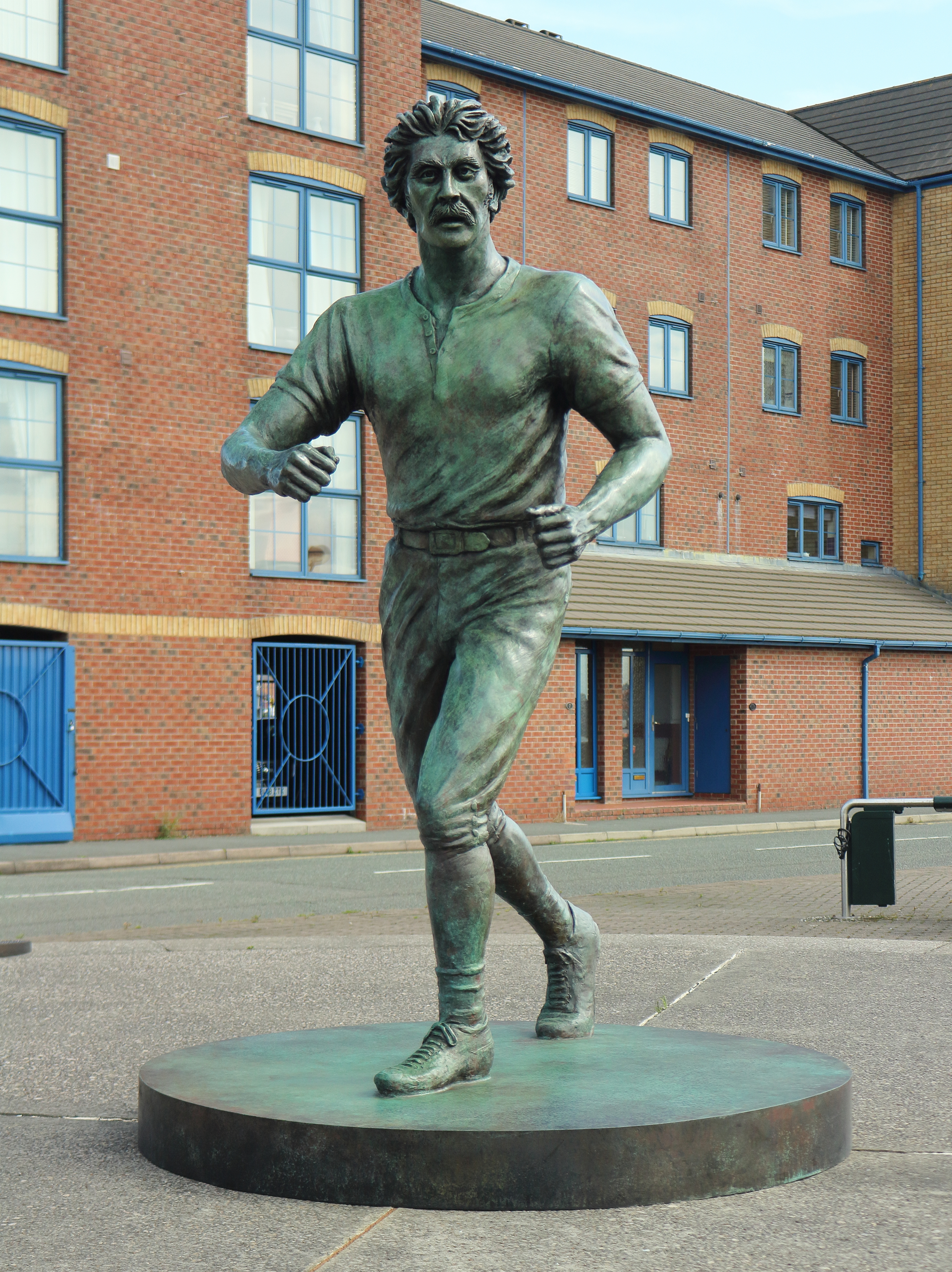
Statue on Marine Parade

Apart from a brief mention in an event at the Gymnasium in February 1873, Hulley faded from the public spotlight after being in its glare for over 12 years. Later reports talk about a trip to North America; he also wintered on the continent to avoid the worst of the English weather but remained in Liverpool throughout the winter of 1874–75 and unfortunately encountered severe weather. This proved fatal and he died on 6 January 1875 at 91 Grove Street, Liverpool, aged 42. He was survived by his wife Georgiana and daughter Georgiana Theodosis. Hulley's funeral was conducted by Hugh Stowell Brown, a well-known Baptist minister. At the funeral in Smithdown Road Cemetery on 11 January 1875, Brown spoke of the value of physical conditioning: 'exercises benefit the pupils in bodily health, but they led to the cultivation of manly habits, of temperance, and of self-denial, and so acted upon the moral character as well as the physical frame.' In his Commonplace Book Brown noted: "Today I buried John Hulley, the Gymnasiarch. He was at one time apparently a very popular man in Liverpool, but there were not more than a dozen people at his funeral. It is a heartless world!"

== Recent events ==
=== Rediscovery of John Hulley's grave ===
The revival of his role in Olympic history was initiated by an article in the Journal of Olympic History entitled "The Mystery of John Hulley". Subsequently, his grave was rediscovered in 2008; it was badly damaged in that the headstone had been removed from the main covering stones and the grave was in a very bad condition from 130 years of atmospheric pollution.

=== The John Hulley Memorial Fund ===
A Memorial Fund was set up to raise money for the restoration of Hulley's grave; to increase awareness of his part in the founding of the British Olympic movement and to revive the interest in him as one of England's finest and forward-looking men. This took several months but thanks to generous donations from the International Olympic Committee, the British Olympic Association, and members of the public, sufficient funds were raised to engage a stonemason.

=== Restoration and Re-dedication of John Hulley’s grave ===
Messrs Welsbys of Liverpool renovated the grave and brought it back to its original condition and a re-dedication ceremony was held on Sunday 14 June 2009 at Toxteth Park Cemetery, Smithdown Road. An Olympic flag had been borrowed from the International Olympic Committee to cover the grave and the Revd Graham Murphy B.A. Dip.Post.Theol., Minister of Toxteth Unitarian Chapel, Liverpool spoke about John Hulley:

Hulley looked to improve physical health in the vicinity of where people in the age of industry ordinarily lived and worked. Until now, Hulley has suffered from obscurity following his early death. Let the restoration of his grave be an end to that. It is with great pleasure that I declare this restoration to be the granting to John Hulley of a place in history, which he undoubtedly deserves.

=== The John Hulley Memorial plaque ===
The plaque commemorating the life and work of the Liverpool Gymnasiarch John Hulley was unveiled on Friday 25 April 2014 by the Lord-Lieutenant of Merseyside and the Lord Mayor of Liverpool at the Lifestyles Park Road Sports Centre.

Before an audience of invited guests, Tom Southern, Director of Operation Pathfinder and member of the John Hulley Olympic Festival committee, welcomed everyone to the ceremony and introduced Robin Baynes MBE founder of the Liverpool Heartbeat charity, and Ray Hulley family historian, as keynote speakers at the ceremony. Robin gave an overview of the John Hulley Olympic Festival and the current work in hand to publicise forthcoming events, and Ray spoke of how he researched the life and death of John Hulley and the work necessary to renovate and rededicate his grave. Tom Southern then invited the Lord-Lieutenant (Dame Lorna E F Muirhead DBE) to address the gathering before presenting the plaque on behalf of her Majesty the Queen to The Lord Mayor Councillor Gary Millar who accepted it on behalf of the city of Liverpool.

=== Waterfront Statue ===
On 14 June 2019, Princess Anne unveiled a statue of Hulley on Coburg Wharf, beside the Mersey river. Also in attendance was Tim Quinn, a former Marvel comic book creator who collaborated with Russ Leach to create a comic immortalising Hulley as "The First Superhero", and a number of schoolchildren from the schools where Tim has given talks.

== Acknowledgements and tributes ==
Many acknowledgements and tributes to Hulley's devotion to physical education were made during his lifetime including the following.

A correspondent, writing in the Liverpool Mercury of 6 May 1863 reflected the feeling of a growing number of Liverpudlians:

I think there could not be a better time than the present, now that such a deal is being made, said and written on the important subject of physical education, to express my opinion with regard to a testimonial being presented to Mr John Hulley, honorary secretary of the Athletic Club. I think no one man in Liverpool has done more for his fellow-townsmen than Mr Hulley. He, in a great measure, may be called the pioneer of the great movement in this town.

Lord Stanley formally opened the Liverpool Gymnasium on 7 November 1865 and was fulsome in his praise of Hulley. He congratulated the managers upon having in Mr. Hulley a director, who is working not merely for the salary he earns, and which they will be the first to admit is a very inadequate recompense for his labour, but who is working out of a real and enthusiastic interest in the business he is employed to do. He went on to say:

I perceive in Mr. Hulley .... a man who, having devoted himself soul and body to what he believes to be the promotion of the highest truth, and the inculcation of the soundest habits, and having had success throughout England far above any previously achieved in his department of effort, did himself establish, and is the be-all and end-all of the Liverpool Gymnasium, which is, in some respects, the finest in Europe

Following his death, the Liverpool Mercury wrote:

Our obituary of yesterday contained an announcement of the decease of Mr. John Hulley, of this town, at the comparatively early age of 42 years. Mr. Hulley was well known in Liverpool as a most enthusiastic teacher of gymnastic exercises, and by his advocacy of the importance and value of physical training, he was mainly instrumental in the forming of the Gymnasium Company of Liverpool, and in the subsequent erection of the fine building now standing in Myrtle-street for gymnastic purposes.

An account of Hulley's life was featured in the Liverpool Citizen of 25 February 1888 by an unknown writer who obviously had a close association with him.

YES, it is perfectly true that Liverpool, once upon a time, possessed a real live gymnasiarch, and it is equally true that John Hulley was the man. It is a terrible sounding title, with a barbaric smack and just a soupćon of classical Greek; but it certainly existed in the very remarkable person I have named. So far as I am aware, John Hulley must have invested himself with the very formidable title; but I think that it might be asserted, with fear of contradiction, that he was the only gymnasiarch who ever lived and reigned in this country. John Hulley, professor of gymnastics and Gymnasiarch, is still a pleasant memory in this native city, and his surviving pupils retain an affectionate remembrance of their old teacher. Hulley was born with a mission, which he fulfilled; and, take him for all and all, we may never see his like again.

Finally, a 21st-century tribute to him has been instrumental in reviving John Hulley's name, deeds and influence in the early Olympic movement in time for the Games of the XXX Olympiad in London:

Hulley was certainly a tour de force. He began to define Olympism long before the formation of the International Olympic Committee. Like Brookes and Ravenstein he influenced the thinking of the young Coubertin.
