= British Olympic Association =

- Country: United Kingdom
- Code: GBR
- Created: 1905
- Recognized: 1905
- Continental Association: EOC
- Headquarters: London, United Kingdom
- President: HRH The Princess Royal
- Website: www.teamgb.com
- Notes: Also includes the following territories and dependencies: Guernsey; Jersey; Isle of Man; Anguilla; Falkland Islands; Gibraltar; Montserrat; Pitcairn Islands; Saint Helena, Ascension and Tristan da Cunha Turks and Caicos Islands

The British Olympic Association (BOA; Welsh: Cymdeithas Olympaidd Prydain; IOC Code: GBR) is the National Olympic Committee (NOC) for the United Kingdom. It represents the four countries of the United Kingdom (England, Scotland, Wales and Northern Ireland), but also represents the athletes of the three Crown Dependencies of Jersey, Guernsey and the Isle of Man and eight of the eleven inhabited British Overseas Territories. The British Virgin Islands, Bermuda and Cayman Islands each have their own national Olympic associations, founded before the modern rules restricting the recognition of national Olympic committees to recognised states.

Athletes from Northern Ireland are also entitled, as of right, to represent Ireland (the team organised by the Olympic Federation of Ireland) and routinely do so in certain sports due to all-island governing bodies existing in those sports such as rugby, tennis and field hockey.

Founded in 1905, The BOA is responsible for organising and overseeing the participation of athletes from the Great Britain and Northern Ireland Olympic Team, branded as Team GB, at both the summer and winter Olympic Games, the Youth Olympic Games, the European Youth Olympic Festivals, and at the European Games. The four constituent countries of the United Kingdom, the British Overseas Territories and the three Crown Dependencies organise national teams separately to compete at the Commonwealth Games, and the BOA is not involved.

== Founding ==
The BOA's origins pre-date the International Olympic movement and its governing body, the International Olympic Committee.

It traces its roots back to the National Olympian Association (NOA), which held its inaugural meeting at the Liverpool Gymnasium, Myrtle Street, Liverpool in November 1865. It promoted an annual series of sporting events across Britain, with the aim of encouraging participation in physical education through Olympian festivals. The NOA came about mainly through the efforts of John Hulley of Liverpool (Chairman), Dr William Penny Brookes (of Much Wenlock) and E G Ravenstein (president of the German Gymnastic Society of London). It took the existing Olympian Games of Much Wenlock as its example, thus the NOA Games "were open to all comers" and not just the products of Britain's public schools.

After the NOA closed in 1883 its motto (Civium virtus civitatis tutamen meaning 'the power of the citizens is the defence of the state') and ethos were inherited by the National Physical Recreation Society (NPRS) which was founded in 1885. From 1902 the President and Treasurer of the NPRS were members of the Olympic "Comité Britannique" and the NPRS was a founding body of the British Olympic Association in 1905.

== BOA members and sporting bodies ==
The British Olympic Association – responsible for Olympic participation of the United Kingdom comprising its constituent countries, the Crown Dependencies and British Overseas Territories which do not have their own NOC – competes at all summer, winter and youth Olympics as Great Britain ("Team GB").

=== Members ===
The association comprises members from the following countries:

- **United Kingdom**
  - England
  - Northern Ireland
  - Scotland
  - Wales

Note – Northern Irish athletes can choose whether to compete for Great Britain and Northern Ireland or for the Republic of Ireland, as they are entitled to citizenship of either nation under the Good Friday Agreement. However in a number of sports, including hockey, tennis and rugby sevens, Northern Irish athletes rarely represent Team GB because the designated federation only selects from those players who are active on the island of Great Britain (for example, Northern Ireland born hockey players who live and play in England). Jack McMillan, a Northern Ireland-born heat swimmer in the gold-medal winning men's 4 x 200 freestyle relay British team in 2024, had previously swum for Team Ireland at the Olympics in 2021.

The team that won the men's 4 x 200 freestyle relay was unique in being the first gold medal relay team from Great Britain ever to contain members from all four constituent countries: an Englishman (in fact two, Tom Dean and James Guy), a Northern Irishman (Jack McMillan), a Scotsman (Duncan Scott) and a Welshman (again two, Kieran Bird and Matt Richards).

Crown Dependencies:

A number of notable British Olympians and Olympic medalists have emerged from the Crown dependencies, including Carl Hester, four-time equestrian medalist from Guernsey and Mark Cavendish, track cycling silver medalist and Peter Kennaugh, gold winning team pursuiter, from the Isle of Man.

- Guernsey
- Isle of Man
- Jersey

British Overseas Territories:

Some notable British Olympians have come from British Overseas Territories, though some have transferred sporting allegiance to England for Commonwealth Games purposes afterwards. Such a switch is not necessary to represent Team GB at the Olympic Games: Examples include Olympic bronze medalist sprinter Zharnel Hughes and long jumper Shara Proctor, both originally from Anguilla, and Delano Williams, another sprinter from Turks and Caicos Islands. The inhabited British Overseas Territories under the jurisdiction of the BOA are:

- Anguilla
- Falkland Islands
- Gibraltar
- Montserrat
- Pitcairn Islands
- Saint Helena, Ascension and Tristan da Cunha
- Turks and Caicos Islands

IOC rules currently do not allow dependent territories to obtain recognition for National Olympic Committees (NOCs). Three British Overseas Territories have their own NOCs predating this rule and are therefore not connected with the BOA: Bermuda, the British Virgin Islands and the Cayman Islands. While the territories of British Antarctic Territory, British Indian Ocean Territory and South Georgia and the South Sandwich Islands are nominally represented by the BOA, these territories have no permanent population and do not send athletes. Akrotiri and Dhekelia, a pair of British military areas on the island of Cyprus, has a predominantly Cypriot population from day to day, and the British personnel there are all born elsewhere. As such, it also does not send athletes of its own to Team GB, nor competes at the Commonwealth Games.

==== Crown Dependencies and Overseas Territories athletes for Team GB ====
Among Crown Dependencies and current-day Overseas Territories, only a few have been represented on Team GB since 1930 (the year of the first Commonwealth Games) while retaining citizenship of, and (if the sport is held) Commonwealth Games eligibility for their territories. These include (athletes in bold won an Olympic medal representing Team GB):

- Cameron Chalmers (Guernsey)
- Alastair Chalmers (Guernsey), his brother
- Alex Coleborn (Jersey)
- **Mark Cavendish** (Isle of Man, won a silver medal in track cycling omnium in 2020)
- **Peter Kennaugh** (Isle of Man, won a gold medal in track cycling team pursuit in 2012)
- Alexandra Jackson (Isle of Man)
- Marie Purvis (Isle of Man)
- Jonathan Bellis (Isle of Man)
- Georgina Cassar (Gibraltar)

Some more have participated in Team GB after switching Commonwealth Games eligibility mid-career from their territories to England before the Olympic Games, including:

- Shara Proctor (represented Anguilla until 2011, entered the Olympic Games in 2016)
- **Zharnel Hughes** (represented Anguilla until 2011, entered the Olympic Games in 2016, won a bronze medal in the 4 x 100 metres relay in 2024, having lost a silver medal from 2020 because of a colleague's doping offence)
- Delano Williams (represented Turks and Caicos Islands until 2012, entered the Olympic Games in 2016)

=== British sports bodies associated with the BOA ===
- (United Kingdom) UK Sport
- (United Kingdom) UK Anti-Doping
- Sport England
- (England) English Institute of Sport
- Sport Northern Ireland
- (Scotland) Sportscotland
- Sport Wales

== Role ==
The BOA is one of 206 National Committees (NOCs) currently recognised by the International Olympic Committee (IOC). The IOC leads the promotion of Olympism in accordance with the Olympic Charter.

Working with the national governing bodies of each sport, the BOA selects Team GB's members to compete in all sports at the summer and winter Olympics. The BOA is independent and receives no funding from the government. Its income comes from sponsorship, fundraising and events.

Great Britain & Northern Ireland is one of only five National Olympic Committees (the others being Australia, France, Greece and Switzerland) which have never failed to be represented at the Summer Olympic Games since 1896. Of these countries Great Britain & Northern Ireland, France and Switzerland are the only countries to have been present at all Olympic Winter Games; thus Great Britain & Northern Ireland is one of three countries that have competed at all Olympic Games. Great Britain is also the only team in the Olympic Games to have won a gold in every Summer games. The United Kingdom has hosted three Olympic Games, all of them in London: in 1908, 1948 and 2012.

== Structure ==
At its formation in 1905 the association consisted of seven national governing body members from the following sports: fencing, life-saving, cycling, skating, rowing, athletics, rugby football, association football, and archery. It now includes as its members the thirty-three national governing bodies of each Olympic sport, both summer and winter.

A representative of each of the Olympic sports makes up the NOC, the BOA's decision and policy-making body. The NOC elects three officers: a President, a Chair, and a Vice-Chair, each for a four-year term. Six members of the NOC are elected to the Board, which oversees the work of the BOA and puts forward proposals for decision by the NOC. The chief office holders as of 2025 are:

- President: The Princess Royal
- Chair: Katherine Grainger
- CEO: Andy Anson
- Vice Chair: Annamarie Phelps

The board of the BOA also includes a number of athletes' representatives and three independent non-executive directors.

== Former Chairs ==
- Hugh Robertson (2016 to 2024)
- Sebastian Coe (2012 to 2016)
- Colin Moynihan (2005 to 2012)
- Craig Reedie (1992 to 2005)
- Arthur Gold (1988 to 1992)
- Charles Palmer (1983 to 1988)

== Arms ==
Coat of arms of British Olympic Association
Notes Adopted 27 April 2016 Crest On a Helm with a Wreath Argent, Gules and Azure: Within a Coronet comprising a Rim set with six Batons erect Or between Roundels alternately of Silver Gold and Bronze proper a Lion statant guardant Gules crowned with a Laurel Wreath the dexter forepaw raised and holding a Torch enflamed Or. Escutcheon Quarterly Gules and Azure two Leeks in pale that in base reversed and conjoined at the fess point to two Thistles in fess two Roses in bend and two Flax Flowers in bend sinister all with heads outwards and slipped and leaved Or the whole enfiling four Links of Chain interlaced in a square Argent. Supporters On either side a Lion guardant that on the dexter Azure that on the sinister Gules each crowned with a Laurel Wreath and holding in the exterior forepaw a Torch enflamed Or both upon a Compartment comprising a Grassy Mount Vert. Motto IUNCTI IN UNO

== See also ==
- Great Britain at the Olympics
- British Paralympic Association
- Campaign for a Scottish Olympic Team
- Commonwealth Games England
- Commonwealth Games Scotland
- Commonwealth Games Wales
- Northern Ireland Commonwealth Games Council
- England at the Commonwealth Games
- Northern Ireland at the Commonwealth Games
- Scotland at the Commonwealth Games
- Wales at the Commonwealth Games
