= Step migration =

Migration pattern

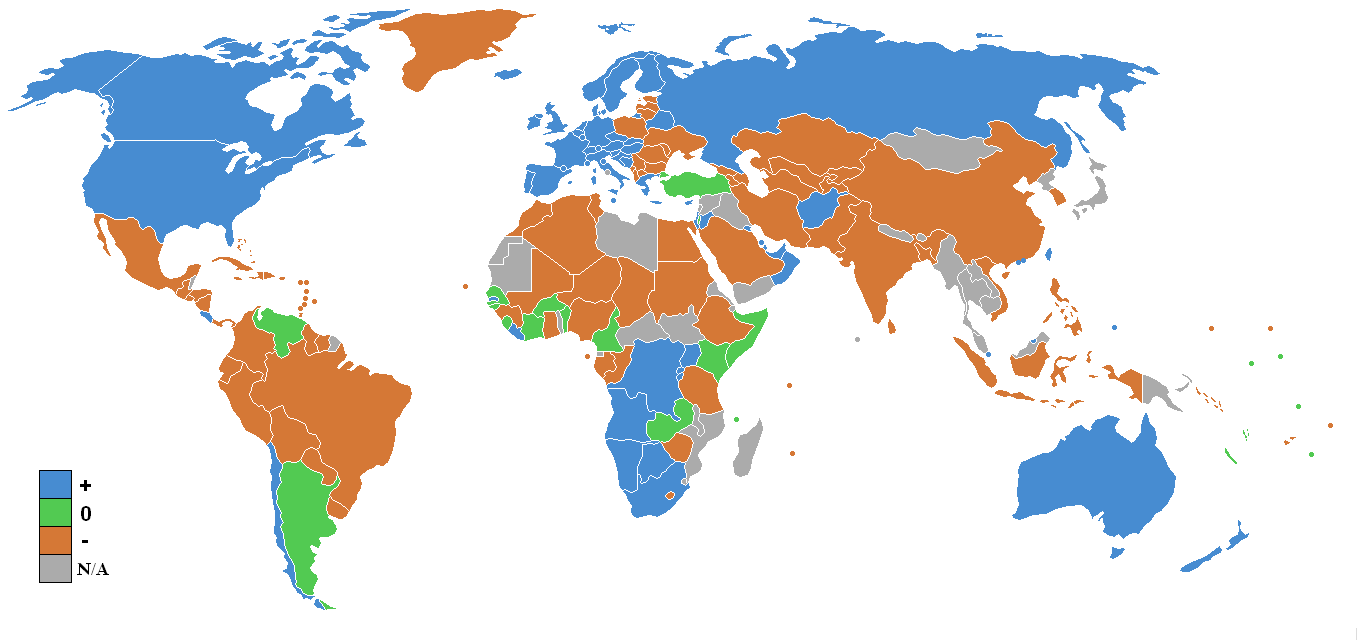
World net migration rate

Step migration is a migration pattern conceptualized in 1885 by Ernst Georg Ravenstein, who observed migration as occurring stage by stage as rural inhabitants move closer to urban areas of growth. It is a migration pattern regarded by some scholars to be a widely popular form of international migration in the twenty-first century globalized world. There is a large breadth of study proving the existence of step migration in many international migration patterns, although there is lack of consensus over its exact specification and measurement. Step migration scholars deem it to be an important international trend that has the power to aid in the design of policy development efforts in both rural and urban areas worldwide. According to Abrahm Lustgarten, Senior Environmental Reporter for ProPublica, in his May 2021 report, Step migration – or "stepwise migration" – is a characteristic pattern of migration driven by climate change.

== Overview ==
Dennis Conway has researched into how migration scholars have conceptualized step migration and attempts to clarify these competing definitions into an operational and consistent definition:

"...a process of human spatial behavior in which individuals or families embark on a migration path of acculturation which gradually takes them, by way of intermediate steps, from a traditional-rural environment to the modern-urban environment."

In 'Laws of Migration', Ravenstein explained how migration could be gradual and occurred step by step geographically. According to Ravenstein, step migration occurred in short distance migration when individuals migrated from rural towns to an urban centre by stepping through intermediate-sized towns. Scholars today see step migration as occurring globally as individuals step up through hierarchies of countries toward their preferred destination. This idea evolved as scholars such as Conway saw step migration as characterised by movements up and down an urban hierarchy. Step migration has been explained as requiring multiple stages of migration due to a failure of the migrant to integrate into the country such as failure to find work or cultural disconnect, which then prompts another migration.

However, there has been confusion in migration literature over step migration as a concept. The specification of step migration has been contested and there are inconsistencies in definitions by different scholars over the progression of step migration theory. It is still a contested issue as to how relevant step migration is and in what situations it occurs, although it has been stated that it is widespread in Third World Migration. Todaro sees multistage migration as explaining labour migration patterns in less developed countries. These patterns are characterised by two stages: the first being the unskilled and rural worker migrating to the urban city, and the second being the attainment of a more permanent job in the urban area.

In the nineteenth century especially, the definition of step migration was contested and often inconsistent. Ravenstein's conceptualization focused on the spatial movements of migrants in the United Kingdom, where he did not see this pattern of migration as related to an urban hierarchy as he saw urban cities as merely the focus point to which migrants were drawn.

However, in the 20th and 21st centuries, the conception of step migration has grown to include the notions of step migration as related to an urban hierarchy and being a "spatial manifestation of a social process of adjustment." Researchers have found that migration often occurs through a 'hierarchy of places' as people a-spatially migrate in a stepwise formation up a hierarchy of places from rural areas to urban, progressive areas with more opportunities. Other scholars such as Paul see step migration as an option for migrants to overcome structural barriers that prevent them from gaining legal entry to their preferred destinations by stepping up the hierarchy and accumulating sufficient migrant capital.

Scholars have found the existence of step migration in New Zealand, Australia, the Philippines and Arctic Alaska.

== Significance as a phenomenon ==
Step migration is deemed an increasingly popular migration pattern among students and workers and as part of a wider circulatory transnational migratory movement. Stepwise migration is seen to be relevant as a partial contributor to the increase of international migration and as impacting international labour migration which in turn impacts world politics. Whether or not migration scholars use the exact term 'step migration', many have identified that migration in the globalised age is often no longer only one stage, but a multistage phenomenon.

Countries such as Australia, New Zealand, and Canada are increasingly introducing study migration pathways, based on step migration, to attract international students with the aim that these students will later become skilled workers. Step and stage-like migration was also seen to exist in migration flows from Poland, the UK and Germany.

Scholars emphasize the economic value that step migration can bring to local economies, and how it creates a reliance on skilled migrants. Around 130,000 international students studying in Australia currently are likely to permanently migrate to Australia after they graduate. In Canada, the number of international students becoming permanent residents is rising, in 2018, 99,410 international students became permanent residents which was a significant increase from the previous year. These international students, who migrate to countries through step migration, are valuable as they are skilled migrants who can aid countries in skill shortages and supply skills and expertise in key industries. The multistage nature of international labour migration flows are said to have boosted the economies of the United Kingdom and Ireland as employment is rising which means the filling of skill shortages, boosting of export income, and lowering of inflation.

Australia's economy relies on skilled migrants to form two thirds of their workforce, partly because of step migration through international students who migrate to study and ultimately end up becoming working citizens. Skilled migrants, which include international student graduates, participate in the labour force at higher rates than permanent residents of Australia. According to scholars, international students have become a highly demanded human capital resource as they are both an education export as well as a skilled contributor to the economy. Hawthorne explains how the phenomenon of step migration may require nations to reform their policies around study migration pathways and improve the outcomes of international students going through these pathways. Countries are now said to compete for international students through promoting their step and study migration pathways in order to be economically competitive.

== Current trends of Migration ==
=== Step Migration of Filipino Workers ===
Step migration was found by Paul to be used by domestic Filipino workers in the Philippines, Hong Kong and Singapore to gain migrant capital and work their way up a destination hierarchy of countries to gain legal entry into their ultimate preferred destinations, usually in the West. Step migration is a popular phenomenon among the developing world as it is a strategy to overcome barriers to migration. According to Paul, it is a necessary pattern as many of these migrants have low-capital and face high cost barriers and immigration policy restrictions which prevent them from migrating to their preferred destinations. Step migration allows migrants to increase the likelihood of reaching the West by undertaking multistage migration often starting with low-wage countries with low immigration restrictions in the Middle East and working their way through multiple countries toward their ultimate destination. Through this process, they increase their savings, gain work experience and educational qualifications which allow them to qualify for jobs in their preferred destination countries. Migrant capital is used to accumulate cultural, financial and social capital to move on to preferred destinations, and these form the reasons given by scholars as to what motivates migration.

Multinational mobility of migrant workers is increasingly popular in the global marketplace as migrants follow an upward pattern of destination hierarchies based on opportunities. Paul sees step-wise international labour migrants as those workers who take incremental steps in a hierarchy of labour migrations from country to country and being able to leverage resources and experience gained. The workers Paul interviewed all started out with menial jobs in their home countries such as working in fast food, and then leaving their home country to become maids in Western countries. However, Western countries are not easily accessible from countries such as the Philippines and so migrants often go through an intermediary country such as Hong Kong which has high wage rates for migrant domestic workers and better labour protections than most Asian countries. The time in an intermediary country allows migrants to gain migrant capital, work experience, and good job references, which enable further migration to a Western country. After working for the required number of years in Western countries, migrants can apply for permanent residency and the process of step migration is complete.

=== Step migration of Chinese migrants in New Zealand ===
Step migration is seen as a highly popular migration pattern and part of a wider circulatory transnational migratory movement which describes the migration route of Chinese immigrants. Step migration of Chinese migrants can be seen through New Zealand as a case study. Scholars have identified a pattern in which Chinese Migrants use New Zealand as a step destination toward their preferred destination of Australia. The aim found behind this particular pattern of step migration from New Zealand to Australia is that moving to New Zealand first helps these migrants overcome structural obstacles of migrating to Australia. There has been an increase in New Zealand departures to Australia due to better employment and lifestyle reasons. Historically, due to events like the Chinese being subject to military defeats by the Western world, the Chinese regard immigration to Western countries as a move toward personal advancement that could only be undertaken by those who possess a significant amount of human and cultural capital. By emigrating first to New Zealand and gaining permanent residence or citizenship, this allows migrants to gain a safeguard or a step toward another destination with better financial and social prospects, such as Australia. There has been a 20 percent increase in migrants who originally moved to New Zealand to live, departing New Zealand and migrating elsewhere.

== In specific regions ==
=== Step migration in Arctic Alaska ===
Ravenstein's step migration hypothesis was found to exist among the Inupiat peoples in Arctic Alaska according to scholars evaluating census data models. Arctic Alaska is also an example of a rural and remote location in the United States where migrants move in and out of. Berman, Huskey and Howe discovered that step migration occurred both upward and downward in an urban and rural hierarchy. Step migration is hierarchical in Alaska as people move from rural villages to regional centres.

The key factors identified by scholars in broader migration literature influencing migration decisions are networks such as family, friends, and community ties. Migrants are said to choose to move because of household and personal characteristics and technological changes, which have significantly impacted migration patterns, as the bridge between rural and urban areas can be bridged over networks of communication. Migration can also be impacted by the environment since are undertaking step migration towards urban cities because of coastal erosion in the Arctic, which has increased the risk of storms to rural and coastal villages. According to Berman, Huskey and Howe, step migration is more likely to occur if family and friends are concentrated in an area, and the quality of information about a place declines with distance.

=== Step migration to the European Union ===
The enlargement of the European Union in May 2004 was said to have resulted in a multistage nature of migration to the new member countries of the EU. Kraler and Iglicka analyzed the migration step migration pattern from Poland to the new members of Germany, and the United Kingdom. The first stage was the migratory labour movement from Ukraine, a neighbouring country of the EU, to Poland and then from Poland to the UK and Germany. The scholars see the motivation behind multistage migration as being both economic and institutional. Ukrainians migrating to Poland do so due to the growing GDP per person of those employed in Poland. At the second stage of migration, those who migrated from Poland to Germany did so due to its proximity, the unemployment level in Poland and the level of GDP per capita in Germany. They conclude that the multistage nature of migration seen in the Ukrainian migration to Poland, then migration to Germany and the UK occurred due to the EU enlargement, the free movement of labour and economic factors.

=== Step migration of African Americans post Civil War ===
During the mid-1860s to 1870s, congress implemented various contributions to reconstruct the South prior to the Civil War. This was in an effort to rebuild the unification of an irregular segregated society. After the former slaves became free following the Emancipation Proclamation many ventured up towards the Lower Midwest from the South in search of opportunity. Step migration was seen 91.9% of cases of this new migration pre-1890. One reason for this serge in step migration was the lack of Northern newspapers and common illiteracy in the black communities, leading to a reliance on verbal communication to have awareness of prospective destinations. Difficulties in transportation also made a singular journey a difficult task. During the American Civil War many railway systems were destroyed, which left many rebuilding projects to take place. It wasn't until 1890 that the three states of the Lower Midwest had stable connections to the South. The journey to the North was also unmanageable for most in one trip due to poor conditions and high prices. The trip would be about 30 hours sitting on wooden benches with only the food and drink one brought abroad. Instead many African Americans elected to travel via steamboat, which was a cheaper alternative to its railroad counterpart. Even with cheaper prices, many had to work in shipping docks for extended periods of time to accumulate more money to continue on the rest of their journey. Step migration was also more commonplace pre-1890 because of the mass amounts of African Americans heading towards the Lower Midwest compared to later time periods.
