= John Bent (brewer) =

English brewer and Mayor of Liverpool

Sir John Bent (1793 – 13 August 1857) was an English brewer and Mayor of Liverpool.

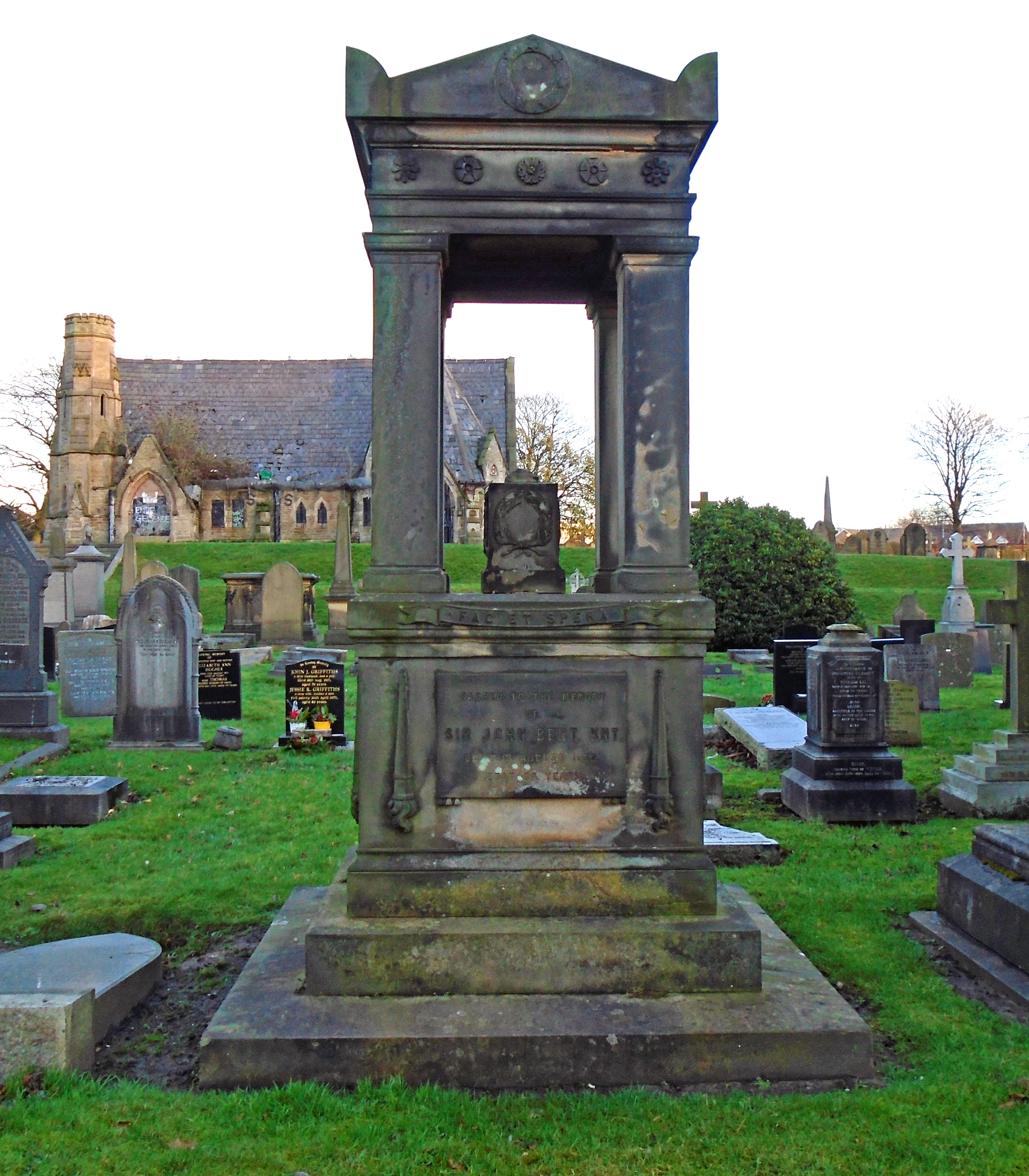
Sir John Bent memorial, Toxteth Park Cemetery

He was the owner of a substantial brewery in Johnson Street, Liverpool and was elected Mayor of the Borough of Liverpool for 1850–51. He was knighted in Liverpool Town Hall by Queen Victoria on her visit to the town in October, 1851.

He died at his home in Rakes Lane (now West Derby Road) and was buried in Toxteth Park Cemetery, where his memorial is now a Grade II listed structure.

A portrait of Sir John, painted in 1855 by Philip Westcott, hangs in the Walker Art Gallery.

Sir John was the uncle of explorer J. Theodore Bent (1852–1897).
