= German Gymnasium, London =

Historic building in London

Coordinates: 51°31′56.45″N 0°07′32″W

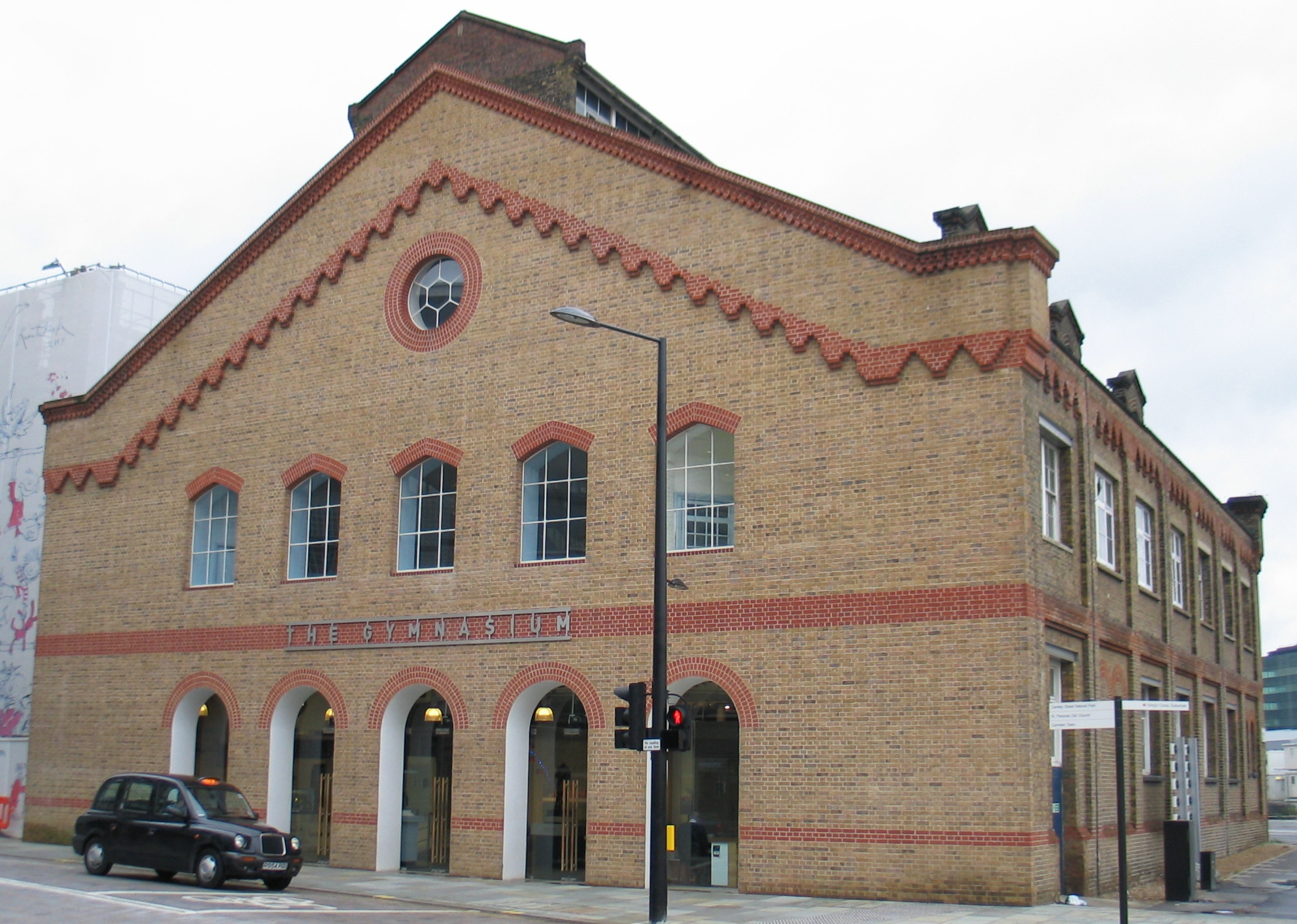
German Gymnasium, London from the west end.

The German Gymnasium is a building located at 1 Kings Boulevard (formerly 26 Pancras Road), between the Kings Cross and St Pancras railway stations in the north London Borough of Camden.

The building, which is currently used as a German-themed bar and restaurant, is a remnant of London’s once large and thriving German community.

== Construction and use ==
It was constructed in 1864–65 for the German Gymnastics Society, a sporting association established in London in 1861 by Ernst Ravenstein. The National Olympian Association used the Gymnasium as one of the venues for its first ever Games here in 1866, shortly after the German Gymnasium was opened.

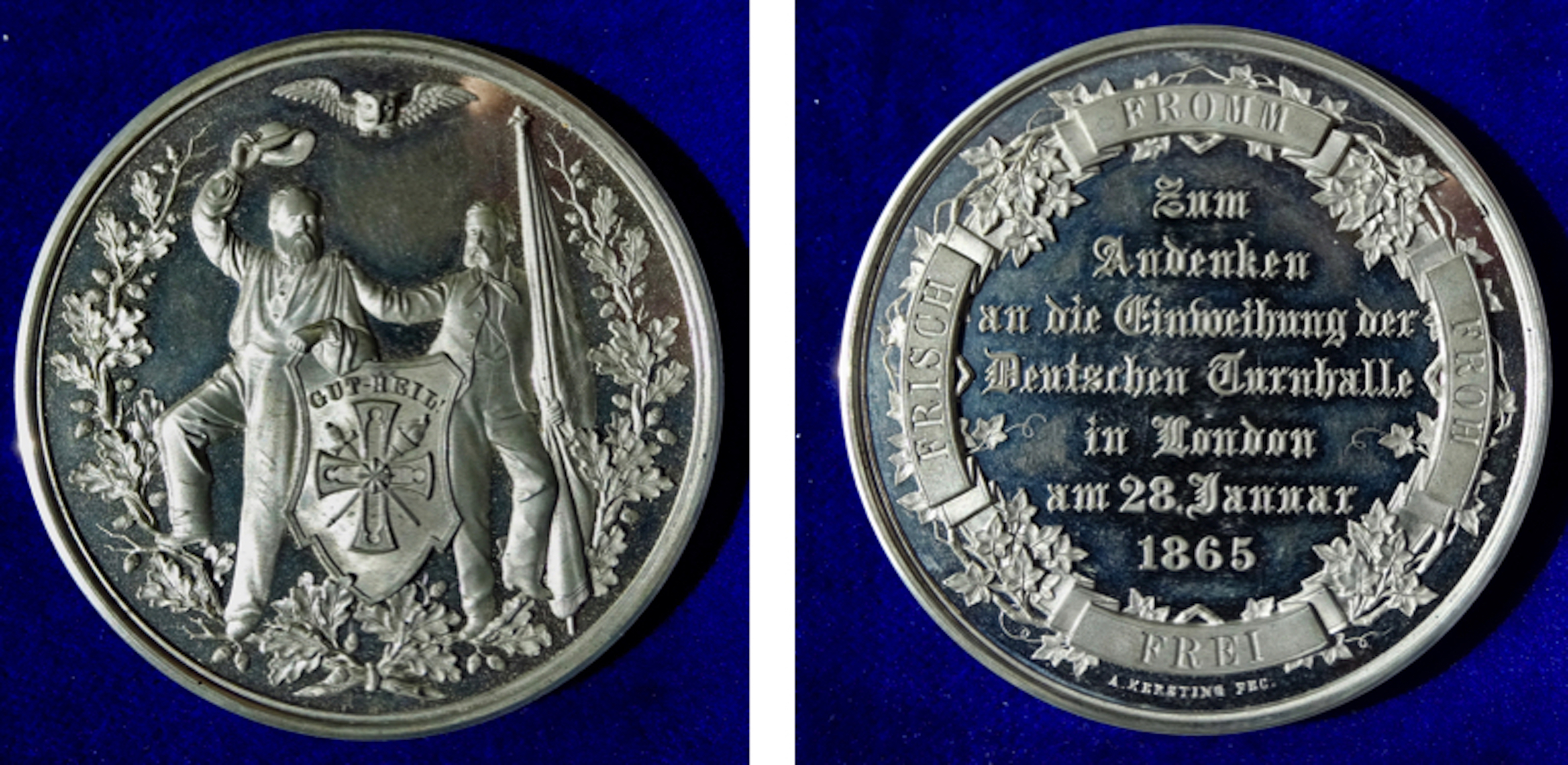
Medal for the opening of the London German Gymnasium on 28 January 1865.

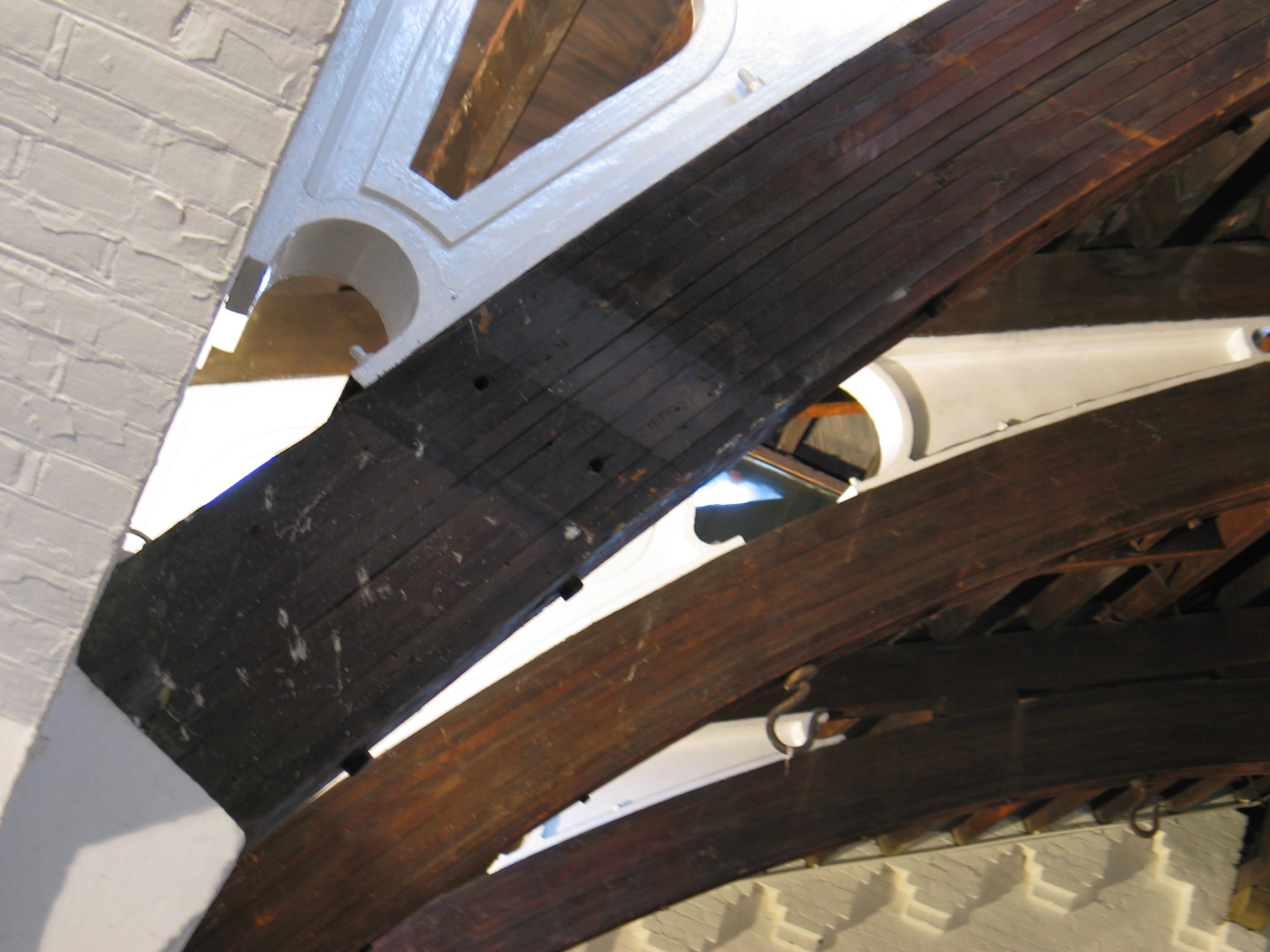
Laminated roof timbers showing cast-iron fillets and supporting brickwork.

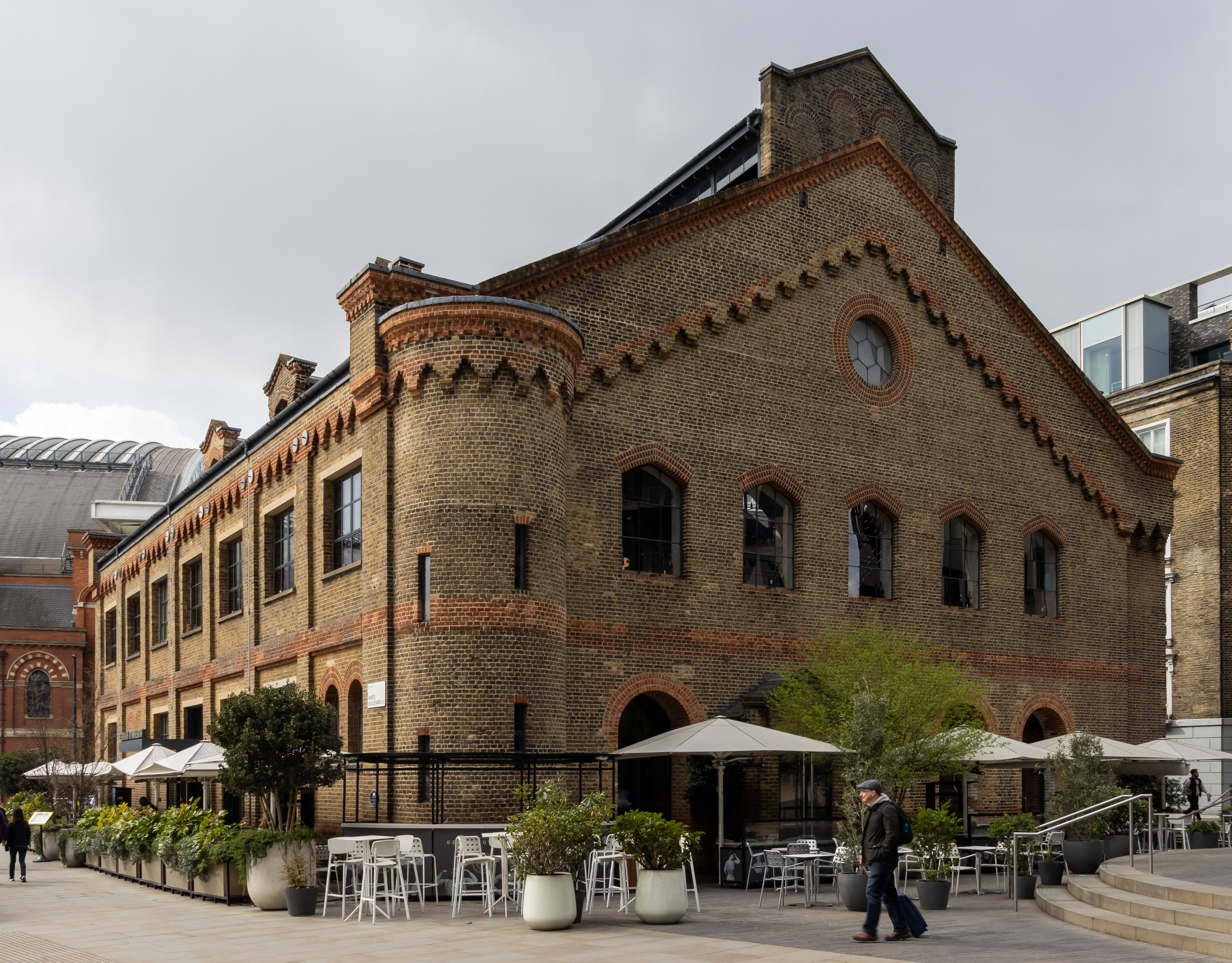
The east end in 2024

Designed by Edward A. Gruning and built by Piper and Wheeler, the German Gymnasium is a 2 1/2-storey multi-coloured stock brick building with a roof constructed from laminated wood trusses with cast iron fillets. The roof is an important early example of the use of laminated timber to give broad spans. The roof trusses – some 20m wide – are as experimented with but replaced at nearby King's Cross Station.

== London's German community ==
London once had a large German community. Poor Germans, especially Jews, typically settled in the East End, wealthy or well-connected Germans headed for the West End, while many professional and middle-class Germans settled in north London areas such as Islington and St Pancras.

The impact of the German Gym, once called 'The Turnhalle,' on gymnastics and other sports such as fencing, boxing, weightlifting, wrestling and swimming.

The area around nearby Charlotte Street, also a part of the parish and borough of St Pancras, was so well known as a German centre that it became known as Charlottenstrasse, after the famous Berlin street of that name, Charlottenstraße.

== Damage and preservation ==
At some stage during the mid 1900's a mezzanine floor was added. This provided useful commercial space for offices but severely damaged the interior space that the gymnasium had occupied. The lower part of the building (the gym floor) was let by WHSmith for storage purposes.

In 1987, a group (The Ravenstein Sports Hall Trust) under the chairmanship of British Transport Police Inspector Graham Satchwell, was formed to save the gym from impending development. The railway company who owned the gym made it clear that they intended its destruction. Nevertheless, a new boxing gymnasium was formed and played a significant part in the training and preparation of top amateur and professional fighters. By this time Satchwell had been approached by Peter Kent, a well-known former amateur boxer and successful boxing coach. as a result the famous Gainsford Boxing club, which had recently lost its premises, were housed freely at the German Gym.

Part of the western end of the building was lost to make way for the construction of the new international rail terminal of St Pancras. A new end wall has been created in keeping with the rest of the structure.

The building has been listed Grade II on the National Heritage List for England since January 1976.

== Nearby Tube stations ==
- King's Cross St Pancras
