= Much Wenlock Guildhall =

Municipal building in Much Wenlock, Shropshire, England

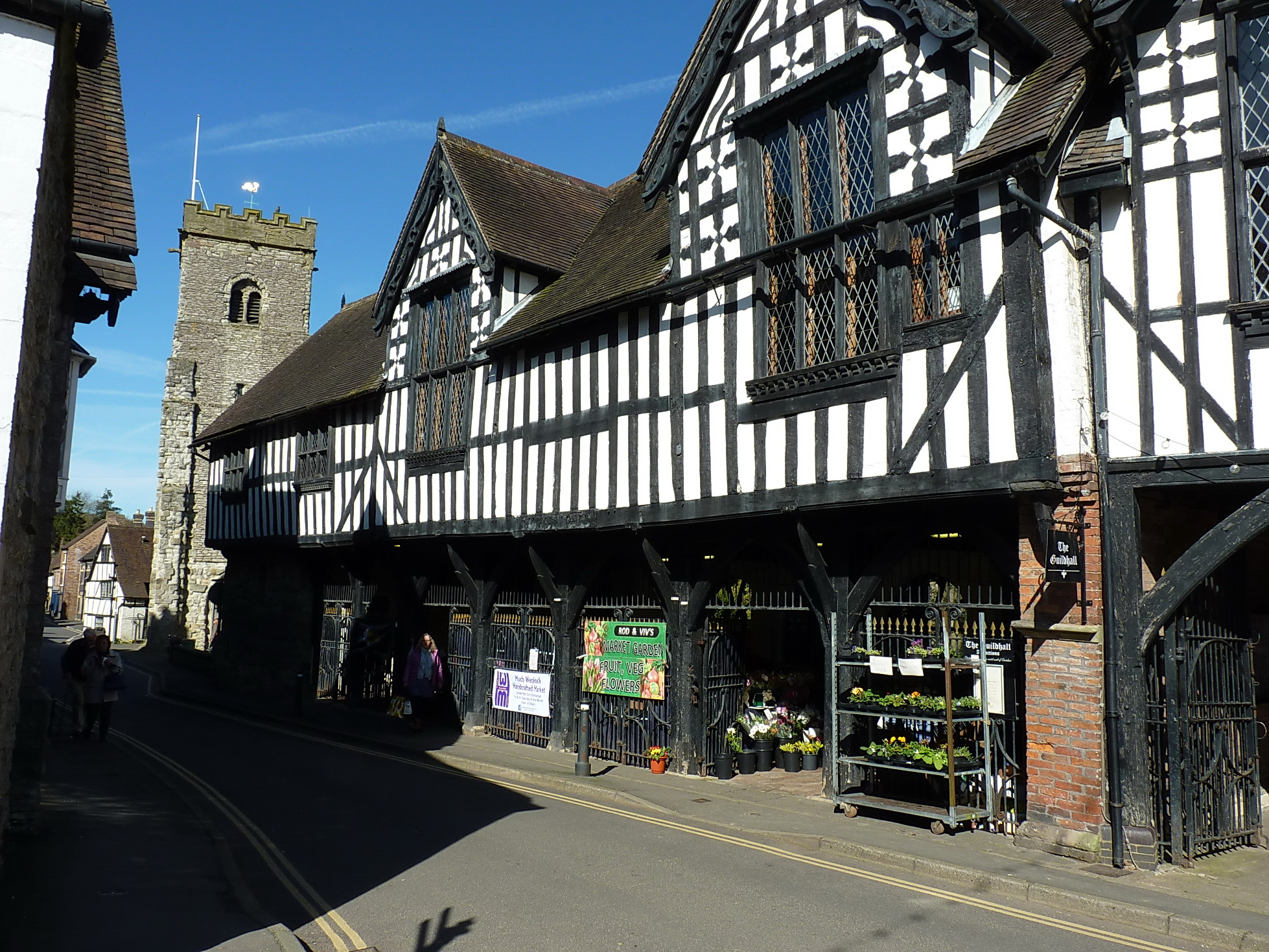

- Location within Shropshire
- 52.59603°N 2.55719°W
- Location: Much Wenlock, Shropshire

History
- Built: 1557

Listed Building – Grade II*
- Designated: 24 October 1950
- Reference no.: 1053794

The Much Wenlock Guildhall is a guildhall located on Wilmore Street in Much Wenlock, Shropshire. It is a Grade II* listed building.

== History ==
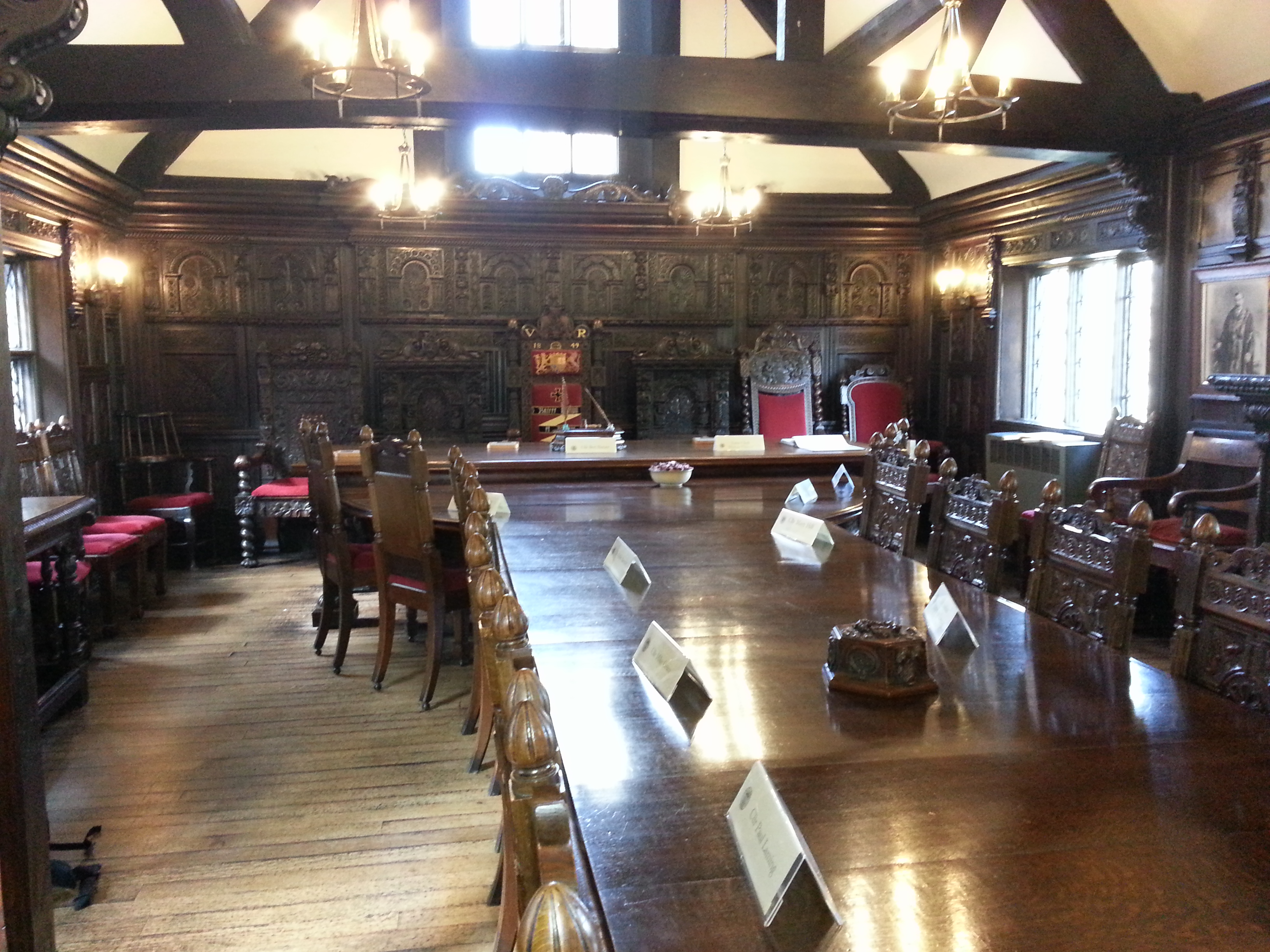
The Council Chamber

In the aftermath of the dissolution of the monasteries, which saw the powers of Wenlock Priory suppressed, civic leaders sought a new meeting place to conduct the business of the town. The new half-timbered building which they commissioned was completed in two phases, the south end (the court room) in 1540 and the north end (the council chamber) in 1557.

The design for the main frontage on Wilmore Street featured three large gables. On the ground floor, at the north end there was initially a prison (it was dismantled in 1869), in the central section there was arcading to allow markets to he held and at the southern end there was a passageway for carriages to pass through. At first floor level, the design involved tall mullion windows below each of the three gables.

Internally, the principal rooms were the courtroom and the council chamber, both on the first floor. The courtroom was the venue for the Quarter sessions where the more serious offences were considered, and also the venue for the Petty sessions where more trivial offences were considered.

In 1546, Alice Glaston the youngest girl ever legally executed in England was imprisoned in the ground floor cell, and placed on trial on the first floor of the building. On 13 April 1546, Glaston was led from the guildhall to Wenlock Edge where she was hanged at the age of just 11 years old.

The Royal Coat of Arms, which is that of Queen Elizabeth I, was erected in the courtroom in 1589. An "inner room" for the storage of court records was created in 1616. A new cupola was erected on the roof in 1720.

The council chamber was the meeting place of the municipal borough of Much Wenlock which was incorporated under the Municipal Corporations Act 1835; it was fitted out with ornate Jacobean style panelling which had been retrieved from a local country house and installed at the expense of the educationalist, William Penny Brookes in 1848. (Note: Brookes also provided the inspiration for the Wenlock Olympian Games, a forerunner of the modern Olympic Games.)

The last quarter sessions were held in the courtroom in 1951 and the last petty sessions, by then known as magistrates' courts, were held there in 1985.

The council chamber ceased to be the local seat of government when Much Wenlock was absorbed into the Bridgnorth Rural District in 1966. However, it still remains the meeting place of the local town council. The chamber contains a memorial board topped by a clock in memory of 16 Allied airmen - British, Canadian and American - who were killed in aircraft crashes in the territory of Wenlock Borough during the Second World War.

The principal rooms are open to visitors free of charge for entrance from April to October. The stocks and the whipping post can both be seen on the ground floor.

== See also ==
- Listed buildings in Much Wenlock
- Guild
- Guildhall
