= 1546 =

1546 in various calendars
- Gregorian calendar: 1546; MDXLVI
- Ab urbe condita: 2299
- Armenian calendar: 995; ԹՎ ՋՂԵ
- Assyrian calendar: 6296
- Balinese saka calendar: 1467–1468
- Bengali calendar: 952–953
- Berber calendar: 2496
- English Regnal year: 37 Hen. 8 – 38 Hen. 8
- Buddhist calendar: 2090
- Burmese calendar: 908
- Byzantine calendar: 7054–7055
- Chinese calendar: 乙巳年 (Wood Snake); 4243 or 4036 — to — 丙午年 (Fire Horse); 4244 or 4037
- Coptic calendar: 1262–1263
- Discordian calendar: 2712
- Ethiopian calendar: 1538–1539
- Hebrew calendar: 5306–5307
- Hindu calendars
- Vikram Samvat: 1602–1603
- Shaka Samvat: 1467–1468
- Kali Yuga: 4646–4647
- Holocene calendar: 11546
- Igbo calendar: 546–547
- Iranian calendar: 924–925
- Islamic calendar: 952–953
- Japanese calendar: Tenbun 15 (天文１５年)
- Javanese calendar: 1464–1465
- Julian calendar: 1546; MDXLVI
- Korean calendar: 3879
- Minguo calendar: 366 before ROC 民前366年
- Nanakshahi calendar: 78
- Thai solar calendar: 2088–2089
- Tibetan calendar: ཤིང་མོ་སྦྲུལ་ལོ་ (female Wood-Snake); 1672 or 1291 or 519 — to — མེ་ཕོ་རྟ་ལོ་ (male Fire-Horse); 1673 or 1292 or 520

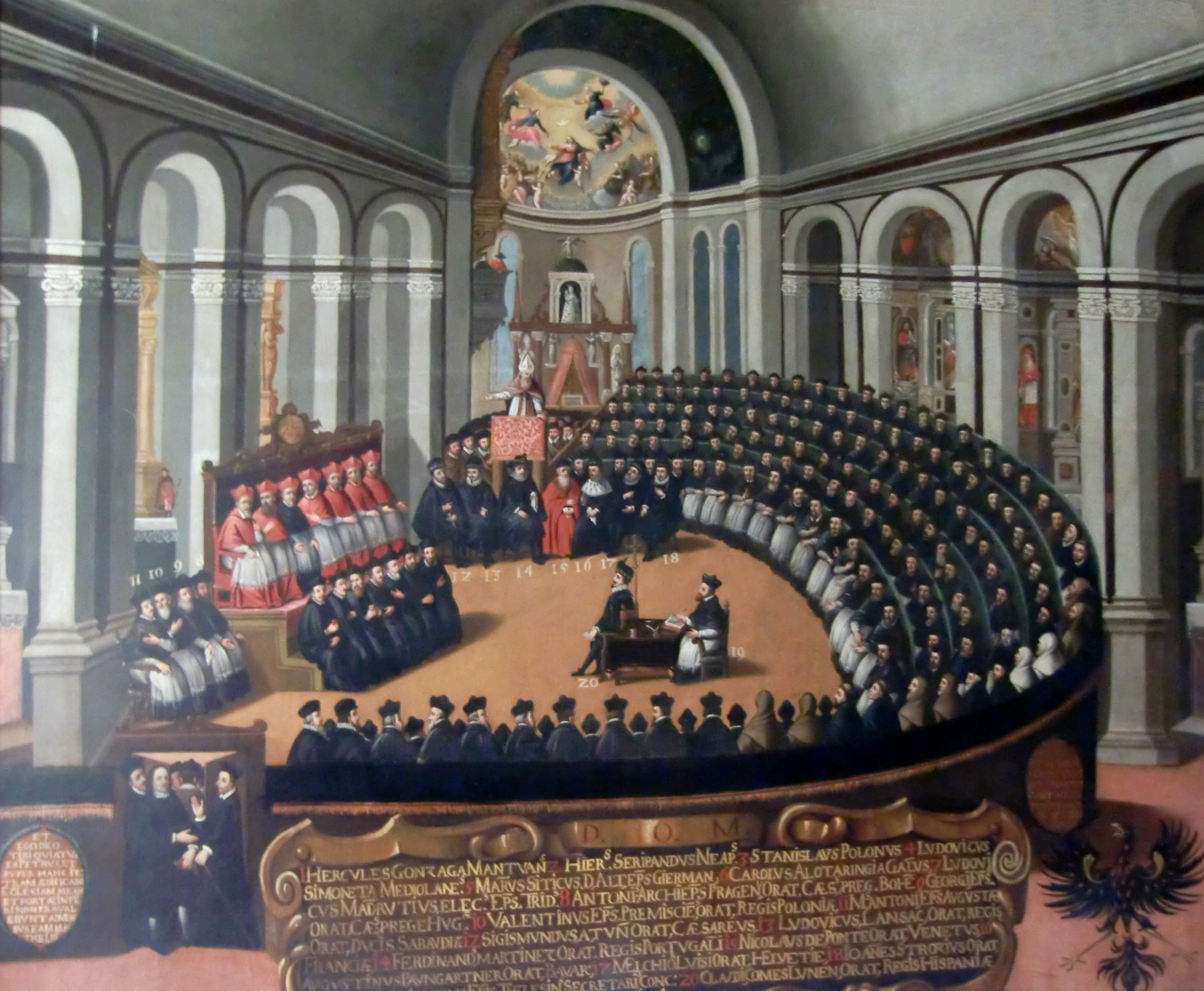
April 8: The Council of Trent issues its first major decree for the Roman Catholic Church, Decretum de Canonicis Scripturis, declaring the Latin Vulgate Bible as the main source of holy scripture.

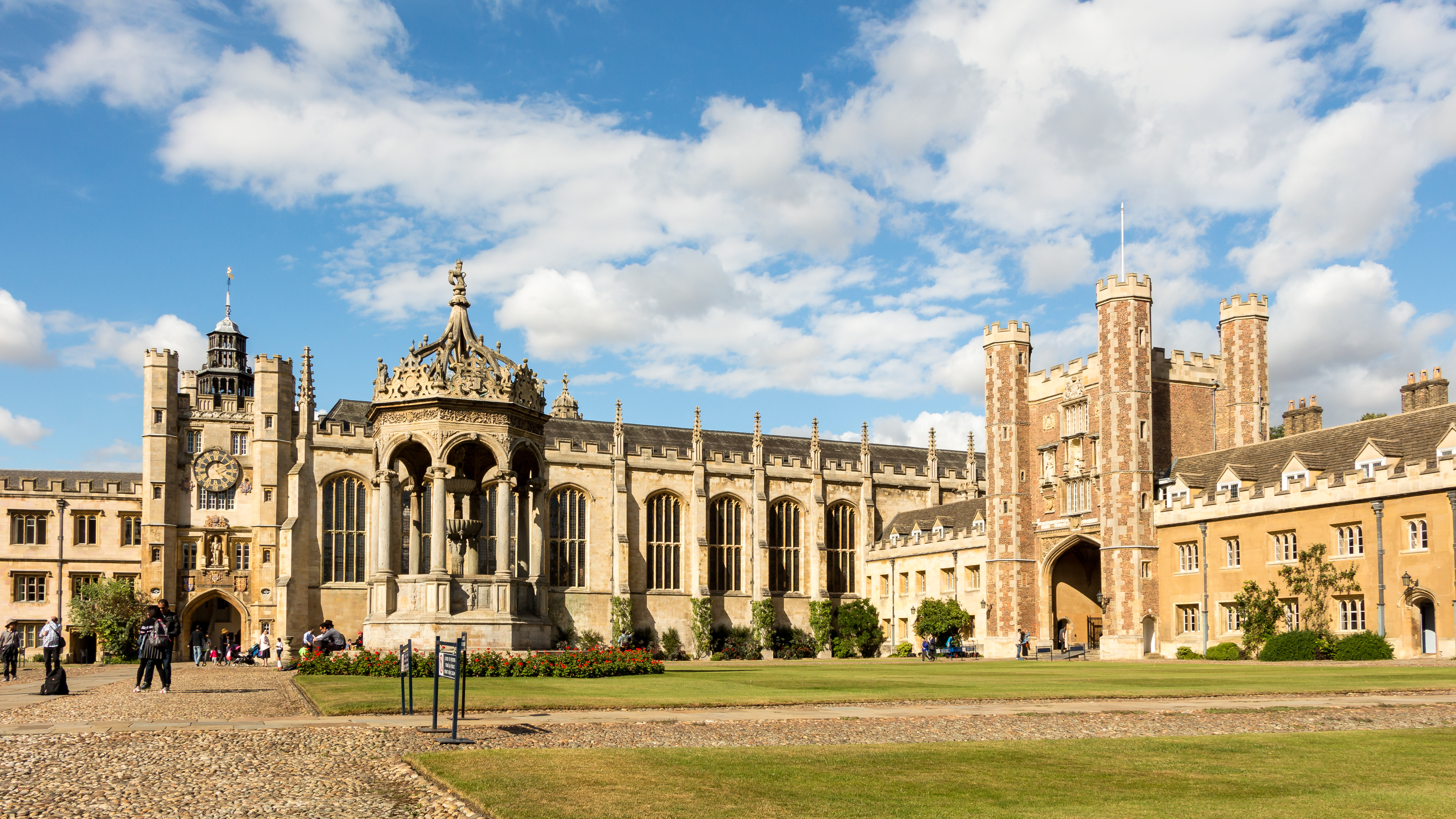
December 19: Trinity College is founded in Cambridge

Year 1546 (MDXLVI) was a common year starting on Friday of the Julian calendar.

== Events ==
=== January–March ===
- January 11 – (Tenbun 15, 20th day of the 12th month): Ashikaga Yoshifushi becomes 13th Shōgun of the Ashikaga shogunate.
- January 13 – Jeremias I of Constantinople, Patriarch of the Eastern Orthodox Church dies.
- January 18 – Blasco Núñez Vela first Spanish Viceroy of Peru fights with Gonzalo Pizarro at the Battle of Iñaquito and is killed.
- February 12 – The Roman Catholic Archdiocese of Mexico, one of the largest in the world, with over four million Catholics, is created
- February 15 – Martin Luther delivers his final sermon, three days before his death about "obdurate Jews, whom it was a matter of great urgency to expel from all German territory,"
- March 1 – Scottish Protestant reformer George Wishart, arrested on January 19, is burned at the stake at St Andrews on orders of Cardinal David Beaton of the Roman Catholic church, after being found guilty of heresy. Cardinal Beaton is assassinated less than three months later.
- March 8 – King John III of Portugal issues an order for Portuguese India (at Goa) to forbid Hinduism, destroy Hindu temples, prohibit the public celebration of Hindu feasts, expel Hindu priests and severely punish those who created any Hindu images in Portuguese possessions in India.

=== April–June ===
- April 8 – The Council of Trent, by a vote of 24 to 15, with 16 abstentions, issues the Decretum de Canonicis Scripturis for the scripture considered to be canon by the Roman Catholic Church. The decree recites that if anyone declines to receive all parts of the Vulgate edition of the Bible, they are in contempt of the Church and should be excommunicated. and approves the 4th century Vulgate of Jerome as its official Bible
- April 13 – Alice Glaston, age 11, becomes the youngest girl ever to be legally executed in England (though John Dean, age 8, is executed on February 23, 1629)
- April 17 – Dionysius II, the Eastern Orthodox Metropolitan of Nicomedia, is elected as the Patriarch of Constantinople to succeed Jeremias.
- April 18 – Hermann of Wied, the German Archbishop of Cologne, is excommunicated by Pope Paul III after his conversion to Protestantism.
- April 20 – The Siege of Diu begins as the Gujarat Sultanate, led by Mahmud Shah III attacks the Portuguese colonial fortress at Diu. Reinforcements arrive on July 19 and Governor Castro arrives with 3,000 soldiers on November 7. The keeper of the King's Ports and Galley siege lasts until November 10 and ends with a Portuguese victory
- April 24 – The first government body to administer England's Royal Navy, the Keeper of the King's Ports and Galleys, is created by order of King Henry VIII.
- May 1 – Sir John Alan is dismissed from his post as Lord Chancellor of Ireland by England's Privy Council after accusations of corruption and promoting discord are made by the Lord Deputy, Anthony St Leger. Alan is later reinstated in 1548.
- May 16 – Writing from Portuguese India, Jesuit missionary Francis Xavier asks King João III of Portugal, proposing what will become the Goa Inquisition of 1561.
- May 19 – The Siege of Kawagoe Castle ends in defeat for the Uesugi clan, in their attempt to regain Kawagoe Castle from the Late Hōjō clan in Japan.
- May 28 – Edward Whitchurch and Richard Grafton are granted the exclusive right to publish prayer books for the Church of England by order of King Henry VIII.
- May 29 – David Beaton, the Roman Catholic Archbishop of St Andrews and the only Scottish cardinal, is assassinated at St Andrews Castle by William Kirkcaldy and Norman Leslie in retaliation for the March 28 execution of Protestant preacher George Wishart.
- June 7 – The Treaty of Ardres (also known as the Treaty of Camp) is signed, resulting in peace between the kingdoms of England and France and ending the Italian War of 1542–1546.
- June 17 – The Council of Trent approves its second decree on Roman Catholic doctrine, Decretum de Pecatto Originali, regarding original sin, declaring that excommunication should be applied to any person who denies the teaching that the sins of Adam in the Garden of Eden condemned all of humanity, or that Christian baptism remits the guilt of original sin.

=== July–September ===
- July 4 – After the death of Martin Luther, the leaders of the Lutheran Schmalkaldic League German states (Saxony, Hesse, the Palatinate, Württemberg, Pomerania and Anhalt-Köthen) gather at Ichtershausen as the guests of Saxon Elector John Frederick I in order to make plans to defend against the Roman Catholic forces of the Holy Roman Empire.
- July 8 – the Earl of Arran, Regent of Scotland for Mary, Queen of Scots recaptures Dumbarton Castle from England after a 20-day siege.
- July 10 – The Schmalkaldic War begins with an attack by the Protestant German states against the town of Füssen, a village of the Prince-Bishopric of Augsburg in Bavaria.
- July 20 – Charles V, Holy Roman Emperor, imposes a Reichsacht declaring Schmalkadic leaders John Frederick I, Elector of Saxony and Philip I, Landgrave of Hesse to be outlaws, and directs Maurice, Duke of Saxony to enforce it.
- August 14 – The Scottish Parliament ratifies the Treaty of Ardres.
- August 20 – Claude d'Annebault, Admiral of France, arrives in England to negotiate English approval of the Treaty of Ardres to end the Italian War of 1542–1546.
- August 24 – Mircea the Shepherd, ruler of the Principality of Wallachia (now Romania) stages a surprise attack in the Battle of Periș and decimates the members of the Wallachian nobility (boyars) who oppose his rule.
- August 28 – In the Imperial counterattack in the Schmalkaldic War, the Holy Roman Empire army attacks Frankfurt, the German stronghold of the Schmalkaldic League, but is forced to retreat after a two-day siege.
- September 3 – Ilie II Rareș becomes the new Prince of Moldavia upon the death of his father Petru IV Rareș, in the Moldavian capital, Suceava.
- September 8 – The first Protestant Huguenot church in France, established by Pierre LeClerc and Etienne Mangin at Meaux 25 miles (40 km) from Paris, is seized by the French Army and its 60 members are arrested. Ten women are released and 50 others put on trial for heresy. LeClerc, Mangin and 12 others are burned at the stake on October 8.
- September 23 –Pier Luigi Farnese, already the Duke of Parma and Piacenza, is given control of the Italian cities of Camerino and Nepi by after a donation to the Papal States, ruled by Pope Paul III.
- September 27 – San Salvador, now the capital of the Central American nation of El Salvador, is re-established in a new location at the Valle de Las Hamacas. Until 1545, the colonial capital had been at the Ciudad Vieja, 10 miles (16 km) further northewest, near Suchitoto.

=== October—December ===
- October 8 – The Fourteen of Meaux, French Huguenots found guilty of heresy for practicing the Protestant faith and rejecting Catholicim, are burned at the stake in front of the ruins of the first Reformed Church of France.
- October 17 – Irish noble James Butler, 9th Earl of Ormond, the chief opponent of the policies of Sir Anthony St Leger, England's Lord Deputy of Ireland up until April 1, is fatally poisoned after being invited to the Ely Palace near London. Ormond dies 11 days later, and no investigation is carried out by the Crown as to whether St Leger is involved. St Leger becomes the Lord Deputy again less than three weeks after Ormond's death.
- October 28 – (4th waxing of Tazaungmon 908 ME) A second campaign begins in the Toungoo–Mrauk-U War in what is now the Asian nation of Myanmar, as King Tabinshwehti of Burma starts an invasion of the Kingdom of Mrauk U (led by Min Bin) in the Arakan Mountains. King Tabinshwehti dispatches 19,000 troops, 400 horses, and 60 elephants, with 4,000 invading by land and the other 15,000 being transported on a fleet of 800 war boats, 500 armored war boats, and 100 cargo boats through the Bay of Bengal to the coast of Mrauk U.
- November 4 – Christ Church, Oxford, is refounded as a college by Henry VIII of England under this name.
- November 8 – (5 Cimi 19 Xul, Mayan calendar) An uprising by the Maya civilization against the Spanish colonial administrators of New Spain begins in the Yucatan area of Mexico, with simultaneous attacks at Mérida, Valladolid, and Bacalar. The attack comes from seven Mayan provinces on the Gulf of Mexico, Cupul, Cochuah, Sotuta, Tases, Uaymil, Chetumal, and Chikinchel. The rebellion is suppressed by March and the instigators are arrested and executed.
- November 10 – The European colonists defending the city of Diu in Portuguese India defeat the six-month siege that had been started by the Gujarat Sultanate on April 20. The Portuguese victory comes three days after the arrival of 3,000 troops and 38 ships.
- November 14 – The Treaty of Prague is signed between King Ferdinand of Bohemia and Maurice, Elector of Saxony with Ferdinand agreeing not to give shelter in Bohemia to John Ferdinand I, the former Elector of Saxony, who is under an Imperial ban.
- December 12 – Thomas Howard, 3rd Duke of Norfolk and the Lord High Treasurer of England since 1522 is arrested along with his eldest son, Henry Howard, Earl of Surrey and both are imprisoned in the Tower of London. The Earl of Surrey is executed for treason on January 19; the Duke of Norfolk is sentenced to death, but before the sentence can be carried out, King Henry VIII passes away and Norfolk remains in the Tower until being pardoned in 1553.
- December 18 – A truce is agreed to between the Kingdom of Scotland (led by the Regent Arran) and the "Catilians", a group of Scottish Protestants who have been holding St Andrews Castle since their May 29 assassination of Cardinal David Beaton. With England's King Henry VIII threatening an invasion to protect the Protestant Castilians, the parties agree that no action will be taken until the Pope can consider whether to absolve the Protestants of murder, and that if the Pope grants the absolution, the Protestants will be allowed to surrender on good terms.
- December 19 – Trinity College, Cambridge, is founded by Henry VIII of England.
- December 30 – Less than a month before his death, King Henry VIII of England revises his last will and testament and designates his preference for the line of succession to the throne. The first four people on the list serve as monarchs at different times, starting with Edward VI (1547-1553), Mary I (1553-1558) and Elizabeth I (1558-1603). The fourth in the line of succession, Lady Jane Grey, reigns for nine days after the death of Edward before Mary assumes the throne.

=== Date unknown ===
- Katharina von Bora flees to Magdeburg.
- Michelangelo is made chief architect of St. Peter's Basilica in Rome.
- The Spanish conquest of Yucatán is interrupted by an uprising of the Eastern Provinces of the completed in November, but the conquest is completed by March of 1548.

== Births ==
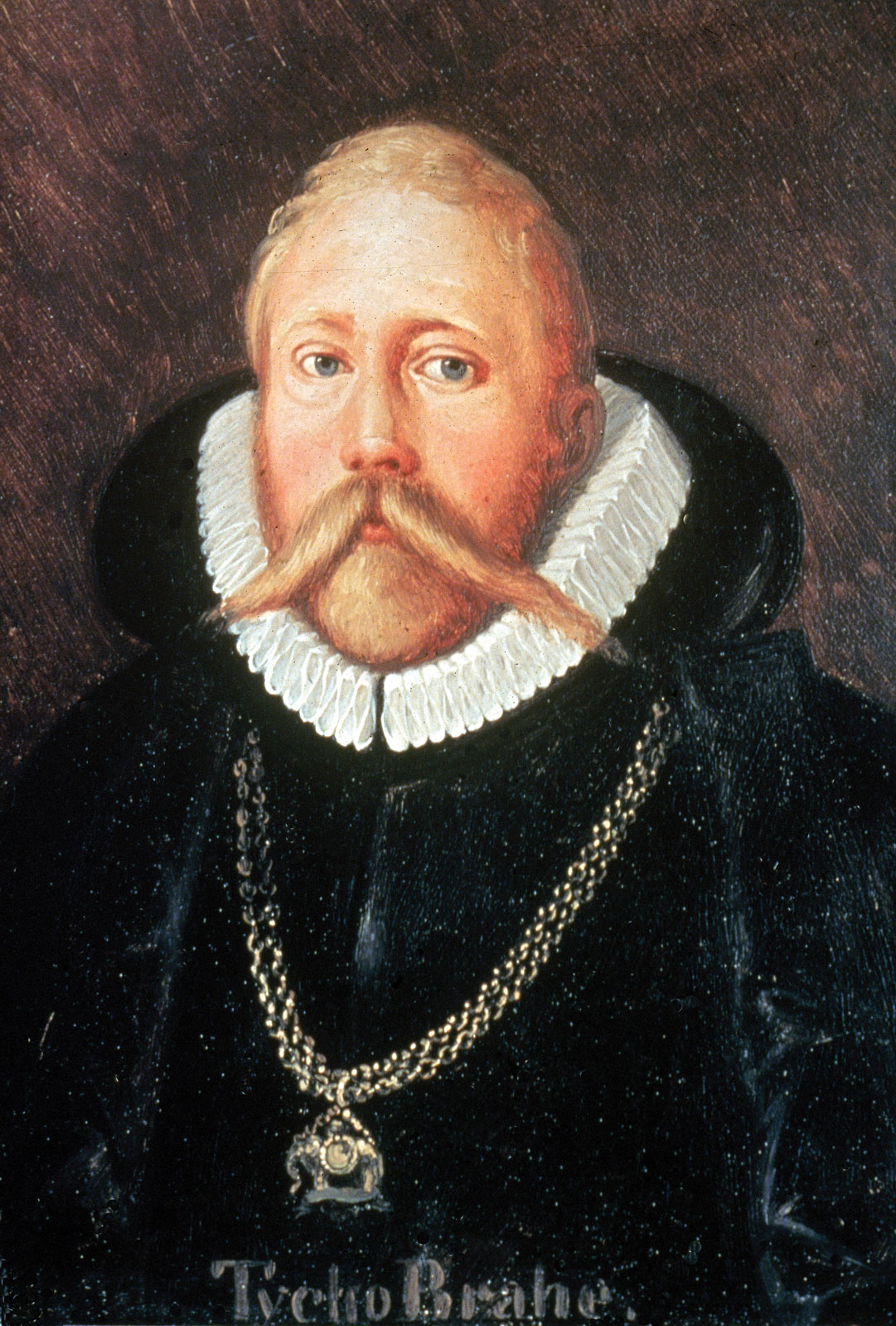
Tycho Brahe

- January 27 – Joachim Friedrich, Elector of Brandenburg (d. 1608)
- February 1 – Mogami Yoshiaki, Japanese daimyō of the Yamagata domain (d. 1614)
- February 4 – Jakob Monau, Polish writer and linguist (d. 1603)
- February 14 – Johann Pistorius, German historian (d. 1608)
- March 16 – Francesco Barbaro, Italian diplomat (d. 1616)
- March 21 – Bartholomeus Spranger, Flemish painter (d. 1611)
- March 25 – Giacomo Castelvetro, Italian writer (d. 1616)
- March 27 – Johannes Piscator, German theologian (d. 1625)
- March 29 – Anne d'Escars de Givry, French Catholic cardinal (d. 1612)
- April 1 – Nanbu Nobunao, Japanese daimyō (d. 1599)
- April 20 – Bernardo de Sandoval y Rojas, Spanish Catholic cardinal (d. 1618)
- June 13 – Tobias Matthew, English Archbishop of York (d. 1628)
- June 14 – Wolfgang, Count of Hohenlohe-Weikersheim, German count (d. 1610)
- June 24 – Robert Parsons, English Jesuit priest (d. 1610)
- June 29 – Dorothea of Denmark, Duchess of Brunswick-Lüneburg (1561-1592) (d. 1617)
- July 4 – Murat III, Ottoman Sultan (d. 1595)
- August 10 – Juliana of Nassau-Dillenburg, Dutch prince (d. 1588)
- August 13 – Jan Opaliński, Polish nobleman and Castellan of Rogozin (d. 1598)
- August 31 – Daniel Adam z Veleslavína, Czech lexicographer (d. 1599)
- September 6 – Pedro Álvarez de Toledo, 5th Marquis of Villafranca, Spanish noble and politician (d. 1627)
- September 11 – Arild Huitfeldt, Danish historian (d. 1609)
- September 13 – Isabella Bendidio, Italian singer and noble in Renaissance court of Ferrara (d. 1610)
- October 5 – Rudolph Snellius, Dutch linguist and mathematician (d. 1613)
- November 11 – Richard Madox, English explorer (d. 1583)
- December 14 – Tycho Brahe, Danish astronomer (d. 1601)
- date unknown
  - Luca Bati, Italian Baroque composer (d. 1608)
  - Thomas Digges, English astronomer (d. 1595)
  - Veronica Franco, Venetian poet and courtesan (died 1591)
  - Takeda Katsuyori, Japanese nobleman (d. 1582)
  - Mikołaj VII Radziwiłł, Polish magnate (d. 1565)
- probable – Lodewijk Elzevir, Dutch printer (d. 1617)

== Deaths ==
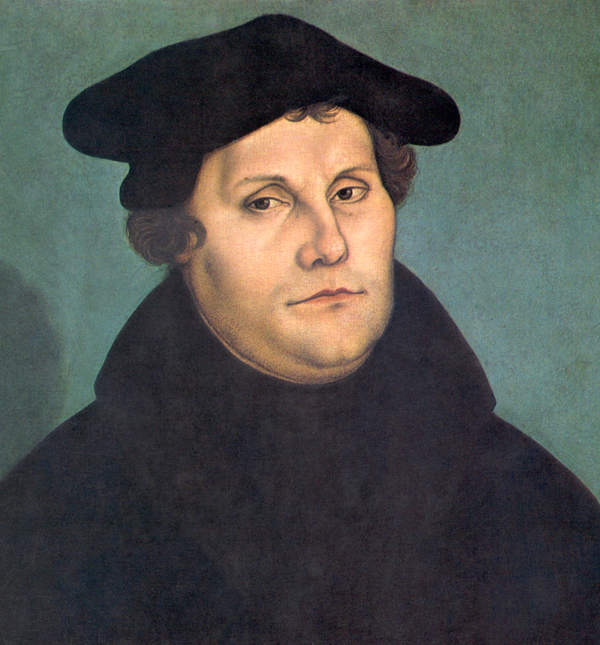
Martin Luther

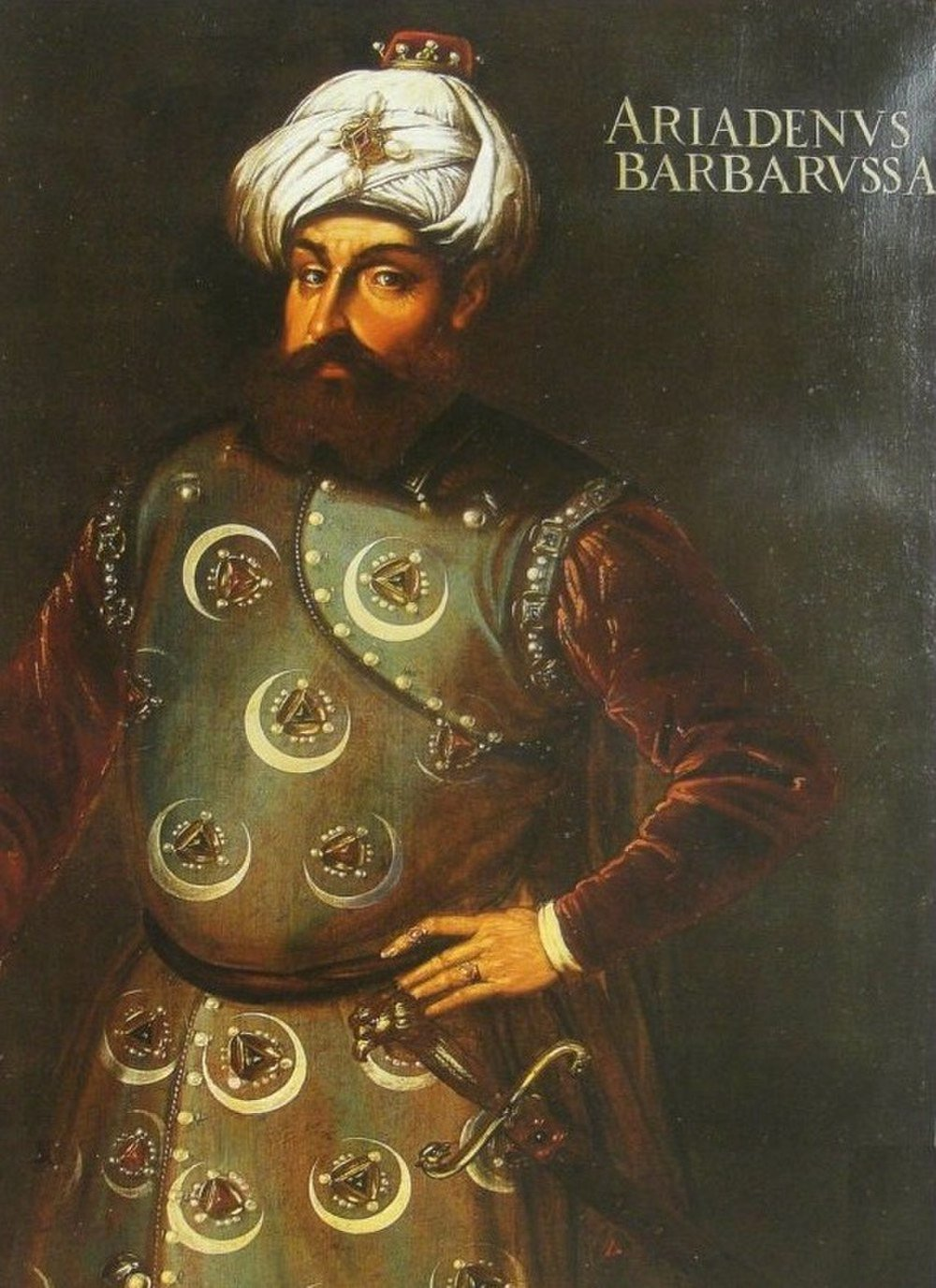
Hayreddin Barbarossa

- January 4 – Camillo Boccaccino, Italian painter (b. 1511)
- January 11
  - Ernest I, Duke of Brunswick-Lüneburg (b. 1497)
  - Gaudenzio Ferrari, Italian painter and sculptor (b. c. 1471)
- January 21 – Azai Sukemasa, daimyō (b. 1491)
- February 18 – Martin Luther, German religious reformer (b. 1483)
- February 23 – Francis, Count of Enghien, French military leader (b. 1519)
- March 1 – George Wishart, Scottish religious reformer (martyred) (b. 1513)
- March 26 – Thomas Elyot, English diplomat and scholar (b. c. 1490)
- April 7 – Friedrich Myconius, German Lutheran theologian (b. 1491)
- May 17 – Philipp von Hutten, German explorer (b. 1511)
- May 28 – Ottaviano de' Medici, Italian politician (b. 1484)
- May 29 – David Beaton, Scottish Catholic cardinal (assassinated) (b. c. 1494)
- June 13 – Fridolin Sicher, Swiss composer (b. 1490)
- July 4 – Khair ad Din "Barbarossa", corsair ruler of Algiers (b. 1475)
- July 9 – Robert Maxwell, 5th Lord Maxwell, Scottish statesman (b. c. 1493)
- July 16 – Anne Askew, English Protestant (burned at the stake) (b. 1521)
- August 1 – Peter Faber, French Jesuit theologian (b. 1506)
- August 3
  - Étienne Dolet, French scholar and printer (b. 1509)
  - Antonio da Sangallo the Younger, Italian architect (b. 1484)
- August 12 – Francisco de Vitoria, Renaissance theologian (b. 1492)
- November 1 – Giulio Romano, Italian painter (b. 1499)
