= Inclosure Act 1773 =

Act of the Parliament of Great Britain

Inclosure Act 1773 (Note: The citation of this act by this short title was authorised by section 1 of, and the first schedule to, the Short Titles Act 1896. Due to the repeal of those provisions it is now authorised by section 19(2) of the Interpretation Act 1978.)
- Act of Parliament
- Parliament of Great Britain
- Long title: An Act for the better Cultivation, Improvement, and Regulation of the Common Arable Fields, Wastes, and Commons of Pasture in this Kingdom.
- Citation: 13 Geo. 3. c. 81
- Territorial extent: Great Britain

Dates
- Royal assent: 1 July 1773
- Commencement: 26 November 1772 (Note: Start of session.)
Other legislation
Amended by	Statute Law Revision Act 1861; Statute Law Revision Act 1888; Supreme Court of Judicature (Consolidation) Act 1925; Mental Treatment Act 1930; Statute Law Revision Act 1948; Access to Justice Act 1999; Courts Act 2003; Tribunals, Courts and Enforcement Act 2007
Relates to	Inclosure (Consolidation) Act 1801

Status: Amended

Text of statute as originally enacted

Revised text of statute as amended

Text of the Inclosure Act 1773 as in force today (including any amendments) within the United Kingdom, from legislation.gov.uk.

The Inclosure Act 1773 (13 Geo. 3. c. 81) (also known as the Enclosure Act 1773 (Note: "Enclosure" and "inclosure" are words that are frequently used interchangeably, but there is a fundamental difference between them: an "enclosure" is a physical boundary around a piece of land; "inclosure" is the legal term that refers to the conversion of common land into private land. All British acts of Parliament use the term "Inclosure".)) is an act of the Parliament of Great Britain, passed during the reign of George III. The act is still in force in the United Kingdom. It created a law that enabled enclosure of land, at the same time removing the right of commoners' access.

== Effect ==
The act required the procedure to start with a petition delivered to Parliament signed by the landowner, tithe holders and a majority of people affected. The petition then went through the stages of a bill with a committee meeting to hear any objections. The petition would then go through to royal assent after passing through both Houses of Parliament. Commissioners would then visit the area and distribute the land accordingly.

The powers granted in the act were often abused by landowners: the preliminary meetings where enclosure was discussed, intended to be held in public, were often made in the presence of only the local landowners. They regularly chose their own solicitors, surveyors and commissioners to decide on each case. In 1774, Parliament added an amendment to the act under the standing orders that every petition for enclosure had to be affixed to the door of the local church for three consecutive Sundays in August or September.

The act eventually limited the amount of traffic on culverted paths as they often fell within land that was to be enclosed. This often meant that traffic eventually stopped going along certain routes, such as the path above the culverted Shit Brook in Much Wenlock.

== Subsequent developments ==
So much of the act as relates to double costs was repealed by section 1 of, and the schedule to, the Statute Law Revision Act 1861 (24 & 25 Vict. c. 101), which came into force on 6 August 1861.

== See also ==
- Inclosure act
