= Steve Perks =

English footballer (1963–2021)

Personal information
- Full name: Stephen John Perks
- Date of birth: 19 April 1963
- Place of birth: Bridgnorth, England
- Date of death: 28 April 2021 (aged 58)
- Place of death: Shrewsbury, England
- Position: Goalkeeper

Youth career
- Shrewsbury Town

Senior career*
Years	Team	Apps	(Gls)
1982–1992	Shrewsbury Town	243	(0)
- Torquay United
- Telford United
- Stafford Rangers
- * Club domestic league appearances and goals

Stephen John Perks (19 April 1963 – 28 April 2021) was an English professional footballer who played as a goalkeeper.

== Early life ==
Born in Bridgnorth, Perks attended William Brookes School in Much Wenlock, leaving at the age of 16.

== Career ==
After making his debut for the club in the Welsh Cup in February 1982, Perks made 243 appearances in the Football League for Shrewsbury Town, and 292 appearances in all competitions. He later played non-league football for Torquay United, Telford United and Stafford Rangers.

He also played cricket for Much Wenlock Cricket Club.

== Later life and death ==
After retiring from football Perks worked as an estate agent in Shrewsbury, before dying on 28 April 2021 aged 58. He was survived by two children.
