= Corn Exchange, Much Wenlock =

Commercial building in Much Wenlock, Shropshire, England

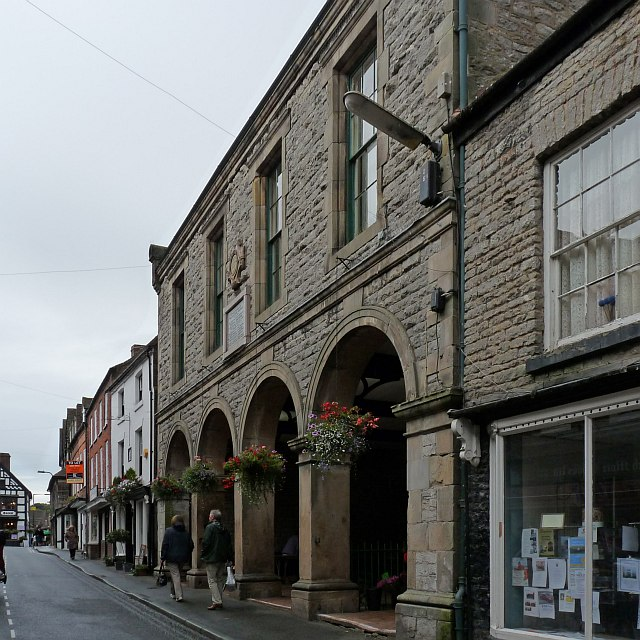
- Corn Exchange, Much Wenlock

- Shown in Shropshire
- 52.5956°N 2.5579°W
- Location: High Street, Much Wenlock

History
- Built: 1852

Site notes
- Architect: Samuel Pountney Smith
- Architectural style: Neoclassical style

Listed Building – Grade II
- Official name: County Library
- Designated: 1 February 1974
- Reference no.: 1189235

The Corn Exchange is a commercial building in the High Street in Much Wenlock, Shropshire, England. The structure, which is currently used as a library, is a Grade II listed building.

== History ==
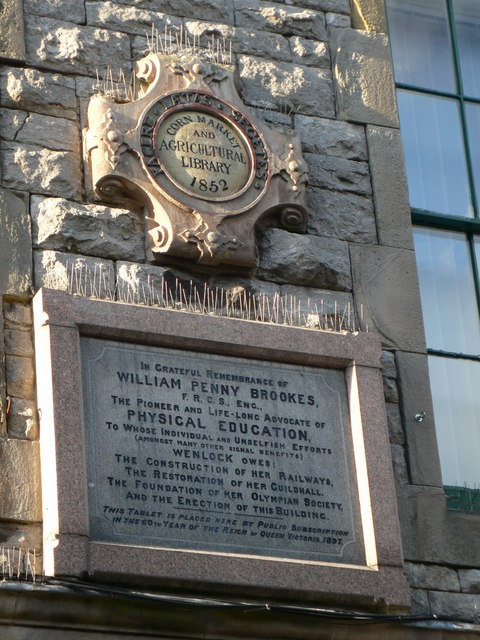
Plaque on the building commemorating the life of William Penny Brookes

In the mid-19th century, the educationalist, William Penny Brookes, launched an initiative to commission a combined corn exchange and agricultural library, which would be financed by public subscription and would not only protect market traders from inclement weather, but also provide a forum for the education of farmers and their labourers. (Note: Brookes also provided the inspiration for the Wenlock Olympian Games, a forerunner of the modern Olympic Games.)

The new building was designed by Samuel Pountney Smith in the neoclassical style, built in rubble masonry and was completed in 1852. The design involved a symmetrical main frontage of four bays facing onto the High Street. On the ground floor, there was a loggia formed by four large arches, while, on the first floor, there were four sash windows with architraves. There were quoins at the corners and, at roof level, there was a cornice. A cartouche, which was inscribed with the date of construction and encircled by the words "Corn Exchange and Agricultural Library", was installed on the front of the building. Internally, the principal rooms were the trading area on the ground floor and a library, a reading room and a museum on the first floor.

Brookes used the room on the first floor to accommodate the books of a lending library, which he had recently established and whose members, he had named as the "Wenlock Agricultural Reading Society". Following Brookes's death in 1895, a plaque to commemorate his life was installed on the front of the building, just below the cartouche, in 1897.

The use of the building as a corn exchange declined significantly in the wake of the Great Depression of British Agriculture in the late 19th century. The Wenlock Agricultural Reading Society also ceased operating around the turn of the century and Much Wenlock Rural Borough Council acquired all its assets including the corn exchange, the remaining library books and the sociey's archives.

The County Library moved into the first floor of the building in 1962, and, following local government reorganisation in 1974, Much Wenlock Town Council established its offices there as well.

== See also ==
- Corn exchanges in England
