= Inclosure act =

Stock short title used for UK legislation

The inclosure acts (Note: "Enclosure" and "inclosure" are words that are frequently used interchangeably, but there is a fundamental difference between them: an "enclosure" is a physical boundary around a piece of land; "inclosure" is the legal term that refers to the conversion of common land into private land. All British acts of Parliament use the term "Inclosure".) created legal property rights to land previously held in common in England and Wales, particularly open fields and common land. Between 1604 and 1914 over 5,200 individual acts enclosing public land were passed, affecting 28,000 km^{2}.

== History ==
Before the enclosures in England, a portion of the land was categorized as "common" or "waste". (Note: The Domesday Book records various manors as waste (Latin: vasta, wasta). Holdings described as waste or not in use paid no tax.) "Common" land was under the control of the lord of the manor, but certain rights on the land such as pasture, pannage, or estovers were held variously by certain nearby properties, or (occasionally) in gross by all manorial tenants. "Waste" was land without value as a farm strip – often very narrow areas (typically less than a yard wide) in awkward locations (such as cliff edges, or inconveniently shaped manorial borders), but also bare rock, and similar. "Waste" was not officially used by anyone, and so was often farmed by landless peasants.

The remaining land was organised into a large number of narrow strips, each tenant possessing a number of disparate strips throughout the manor, as would the manorial lord. Called the open-field system, it was administered by manorial courts, which exercised some collective control. What might now be termed a single field would have been divided under this system among the lord and his tenants; poorer peasants (serfs or copyholders, depending on the era) were allowed to live on the strips owned by the lord in return for cultivating his land. The system facilitated common grazing and crop rotation.

Any individual might possess several strips of land within the manor, often at some distance from one another. Seeking better financial returns, landowners looked for more efficient farming techniques. Enclosure acts for small areas had been passed sporadically since the 12th century, but advances in agricultural knowledge and technology in the 18th century made them more commonplace. Because tenants, or even copyholders, had legally enforceable rights on the land, substantial compensation was provided to extinguish them; thus many tenants were active supporters of enclosure, though it enabled landlords to force reluctant tenants to comply with the process.

With legal control of the land, landlords introduced innovations in methods of crop production, increasing profits and supporting the Agricultural Revolution; higher productivity also enabled landowners to justify higher rents for the people working the land.

The powers granted in the Inclosure Act 1773 (13 Geo. 3. c. 81) of the Parliament of Great Britain were often abused by landowners: the preliminary meetings where enclosure was discussed, intended to be held in public, often took place in the presence of only the local landowners, who regularly chose their own solicitors, surveyors and commissioners to decide on each case. In 1786 there were still 250,000 independent landowners, but in the course of only thirty years their number was reduced to 32,000.

The tenants displaced by the process often left the countryside to work in the towns. This contributed to the Industrial Revolution – at the very moment new technological advances required large numbers of workers, a concentration of large numbers of people in need of work had emerged; the former country tenants and their descendants became workers in industrial factories within cities.

The Inclosure (Consolidation) Act 1801 (41 Geo. 3. (U.K.) c. 109) was passed to tidy up previous acts. The Inclosure Act 1845 (8 & 9 Vict. c. 118) instituted the appointment of Inclosure Commissioners, who could enclose land without submitting a request to Parliament.

== List of acts ==
- The Inclosure Act 1773 (13 Geo. 3. c. 81)

The Inclosure Acts 1845 to 1882 mean:

- The Inclosure Act 1845 (8 & 9 Vict. c. 118)
- The Inclosure Act 1846 (9 & 10 Vict. c. 70)
- The Inclosure Act 1847 (10 & 11 Vict. c. 11
- The Inclosure Act 1848 (11 & 12 Vict. c. 99)
- The Inclosure Act 1849 (12 & 13 Vict. c. 83)
- The Inclosure Commissioners Act 1851 (14 & 15 Vict. c. 53)
- The Inclosure Act 1852 (15 & 16 Vict. c. 79)
- The Inclosure Act 1854 (17 & 18 Vict. c. 97)
- The Inclosure Act 1857 (20 & 21 Vict. c. 31)
- The Inclosure Act 1859 (22 & 23 Vict. c. 43)
- The Inclosure, etc. Expenses Act 1868 (31 & 32 Vict. c. 89)
- The Commons Act 1876 (39 & 40 Vict. c. 56)
- The Commons (Expenses) Act 1878 (41 & 42 Vict. c. 56)
- The Commons Act 1879 (42 & 43 Vict. c. 37)
- The Commonable Rights Compensation Act 1882 (45 & 46 Vict. c. 15)

== See also ==
- English land law
- List of short titles
- Primitive accumulation of capital
