= William Brookes School =

Location
- Farley Road; Much Wenlock; Shropshire, TF13 6NB; England
- Coordinates: 52.6021°N 2.5565°W

Information
- Type: Academy
- Motto: Courtesy, Enterprise and Endeavour
- Established: 1952 (original school), 2014 (Academy)
- Local authority: Shropshire Council
- Department for Education URN: 139769 Tables
- Ofsted: Reports
- Headteacher: Ruth Shaw
- Gender: Mixed
- Age: 11 to 16
- Enrolment: 976 as of February 2017
- Capacity: 948
- Houses: Athens, Beijing, London, Sydney
- Colours: Blue, Red, Green, Yellow
- Website: williambrookes.com

William Brookes School is a mixed secondary school and sixth form in Much Wenlock in the English county of Shropshire. The school is named after William Penny Brookes, a surgeon, magistrate, botanist, and educationalist from Much Wenlock who inspired the modern Olympic Games with the Wenlock Olympian Games. The school serves a community of small villages as well as the larger town of Broseley.

Previously a community school administered by Shropshire Council, William Brookes School converted to academy status in June 2013. However the school continues to coordinate with Shropshire Council for admissions. The school offers GCSEs, BTECs and vocational courses as programmes of study for pupils, while students in the sixth form have the option to study from a range of A-levels.

The Edge Arts Centre is also located at William Brookes School. The centre offers cinema, theatre, dance, music, comedy, literature performances for the local community, as well as student productions.

== History ==
Wenlock Modern School opened in 1953 as Much Wenlock County Secondary School.

The initial intake of students in 1953 was 240 from 10 local primary schools. The intake became 364 in 1971, meaning the school was required to be considerably extended. The original building was extended and modernised various times during its use to be able to cope with the growing demand despite the building deteriorating drastically over the years. An outdoor swimming pool for local schools and the public was built in 1966 and a sports hall was opened in 1975. The secondary modern school later was renamed William Brookes School and became a comprehensive school for 11-16 year olds in 1970. It acquired a small sixth form in 1974.

William Brookes School underwent a £27 million rebuilding programme from 2008 to 2010.

== Notable alumni ==
- Steve Perks, professional footballer notably for Shrewsbury Town
- Ben Simons, British Bobsleigher and former athlete
