= Atterley =

Village in Shropshire, England

Coordinates: 52.575°N 2.529°W

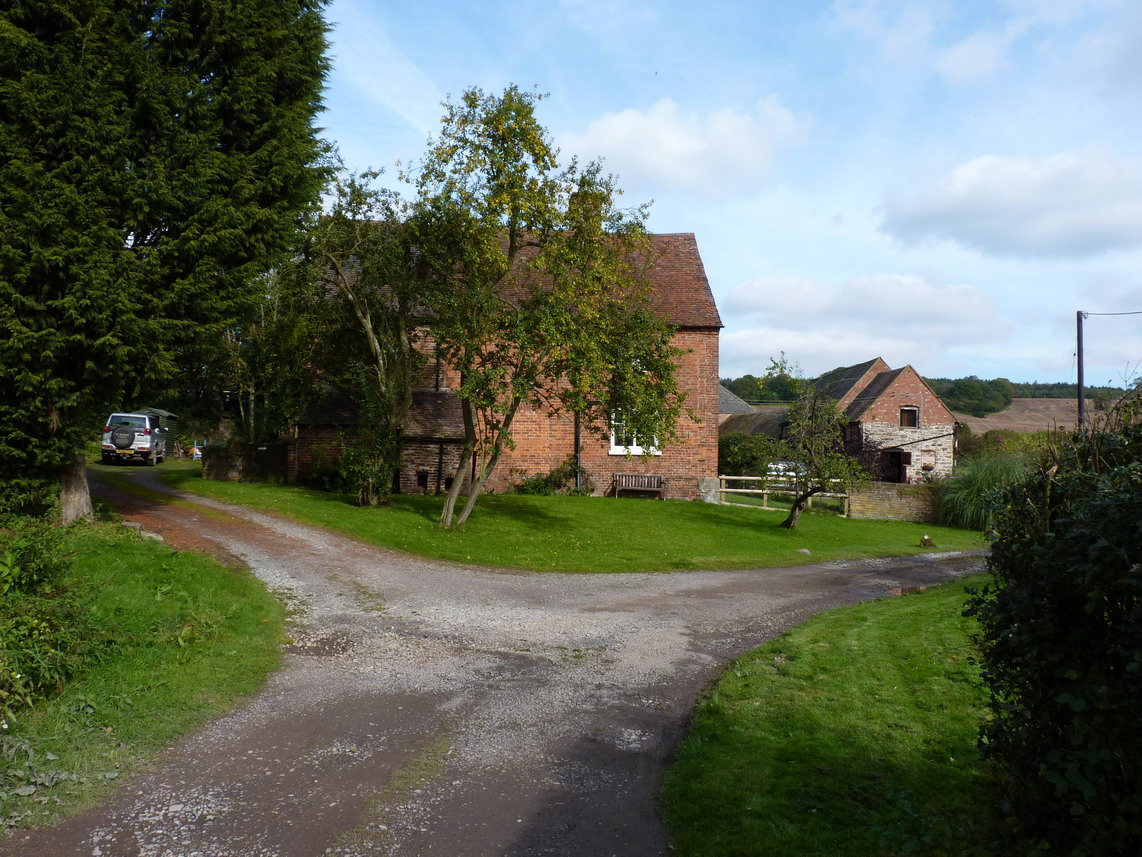
- Atterley Farm

- Location within Shropshire
- OS grid reference: SO641976
- Civil parish: Much Wenlock
- Unitary authority: Shropshire
- Ceremonial county: Shropshire
- Region: West Midlands
- Country: England
- Sovereign state: United Kingdom
- Post town: MUCH WENLOCK
- Postcode district: TF13
- Dialling code: 01952
- Police: West Mercia
- Fire: Shropshire
- Ambulance: West Midlands
- UK Parliament: Ludlow

Atterley is a village in Shropshire, England.
