= Little Wenlock =

Village in Shropshire, England

Coordinates: 52.658°N 2.524°W

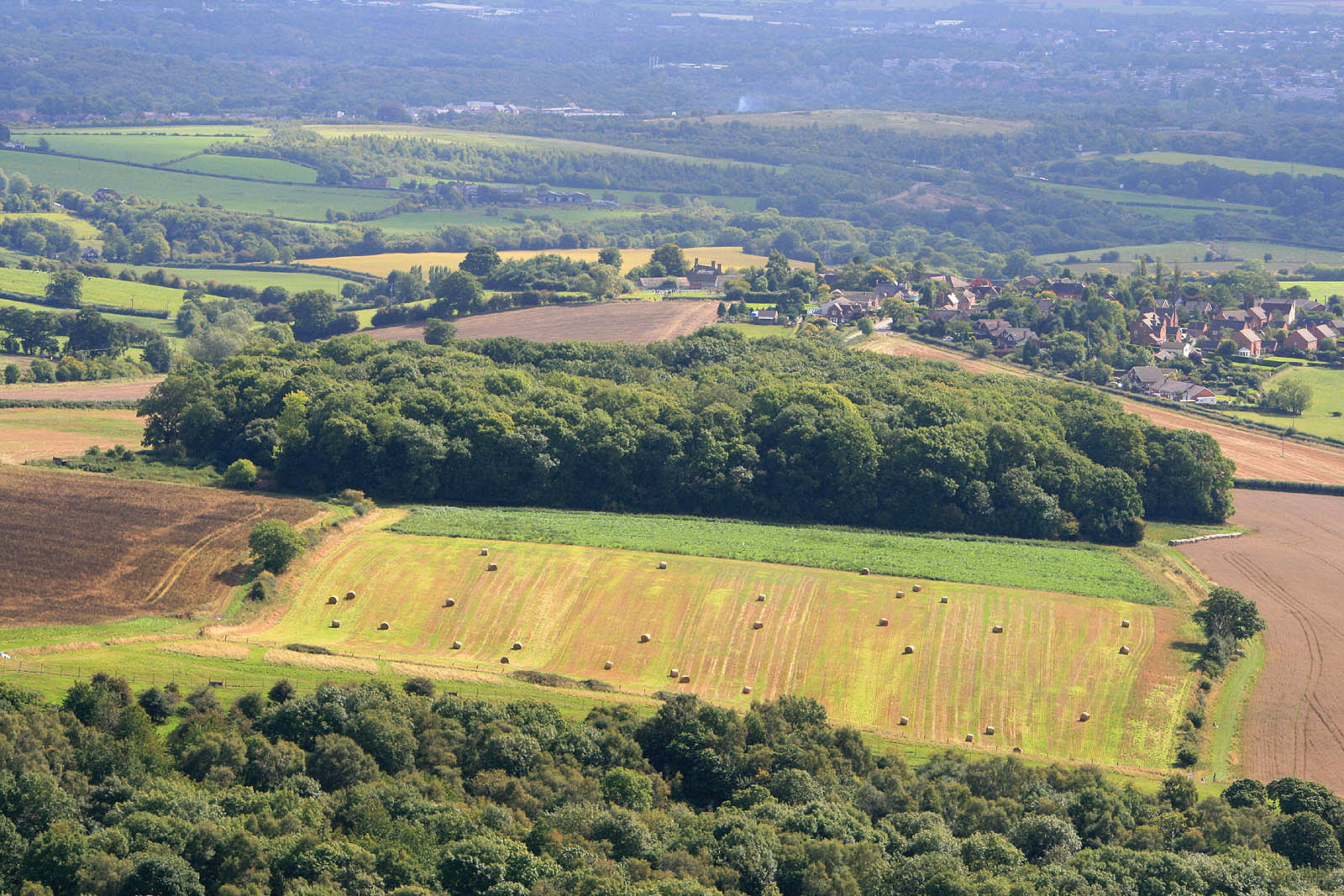
- The Old Quarry Plantation and Little Wenlock, seen from the Wrekin

- Location within Shropshire
- OS grid reference: SJ645068
- Civil parish: Little Wenlock
- Unitary authority: Telford and Wrekin
- Ceremonial county: Shropshire
- Region: West Midlands
- Country: England
- Sovereign state: United Kingdom
- Post town: TELFORD
- Postcode district: TF6
- Dialling code: 01952
- Police: West Mercia
- Fire: Shropshire
- Ambulance: West Midlands
- UK Parliament: The Wrekin

Little Wenlock is a village and civil parish in the Telford and Wrekin borough in Shropshire, England. The population of the civil parish at the 2011 census was 605. It was mentioned in the Domesday Book, when it belonged to Wenlock Priory. Ancient habitation is attested by the discovery of two caches of Bronze Age weapons. The village is situated two miles west of Dawley.

Nearby is the 1335-foot-high Wrekin, one of Shropshire's famous hills with an ancient hill fort. Part of it falls within Little Wenlock parish, while the adjoining parts fall into other parishes.

The name "Wenlock" as found in Much Wenlock and Little Wenlock (and also Great Wenlock, a now obsolete name, but found in some historic sources) is probably derived from the Old English *Wenan loca meaning "Wena's Stronghold" (wéna being feminine and meaning "hope") The town was recorded in the Domesday Book as Wenloch. The "Little" of the name distinguishes it from the larger settlement and market town of Much Wenlock, which is situated several miles to the south, on the other side of the River Severn.

11-year-old Alice Glaston from Little Wenlock may have been hanged together with two men in Much Wenlock in 1544 making her the youngest known girl legally executed in England. The Cambrian Journal dated 1861 includes the only known evidence of Alice's death, and provides a transcription of local parish registers from the 16th century written by the vicar of Much Wenlock, Sir Thomas Butler. A month-by-month list of burials includes the following: "Here was buried John Dod of the parish of Little Wenlock, who was hanged here, as also Alice Glaston, 11 yrs of age, of the parish of Little Wenlock, and Wm. Harper, a tailor."

The village features a public house (the "Huntsman Inn"), village hall, playing field and the Church of England parish church of St Lawrence. Charles Henry Hartshorne, antiquary and cleric, was curate at the church from 1828 to 1836, and David Cranage, later Dean of Norwich, was curate at the church in 1897–1898.

For many years there was small scale mining in the parish, for coal, limestone and fire clay.

== See also ==
- Listed buildings in Little Wenlock
