= Holy Trinity Church, Much Wenlock =

Holy Trinity Church
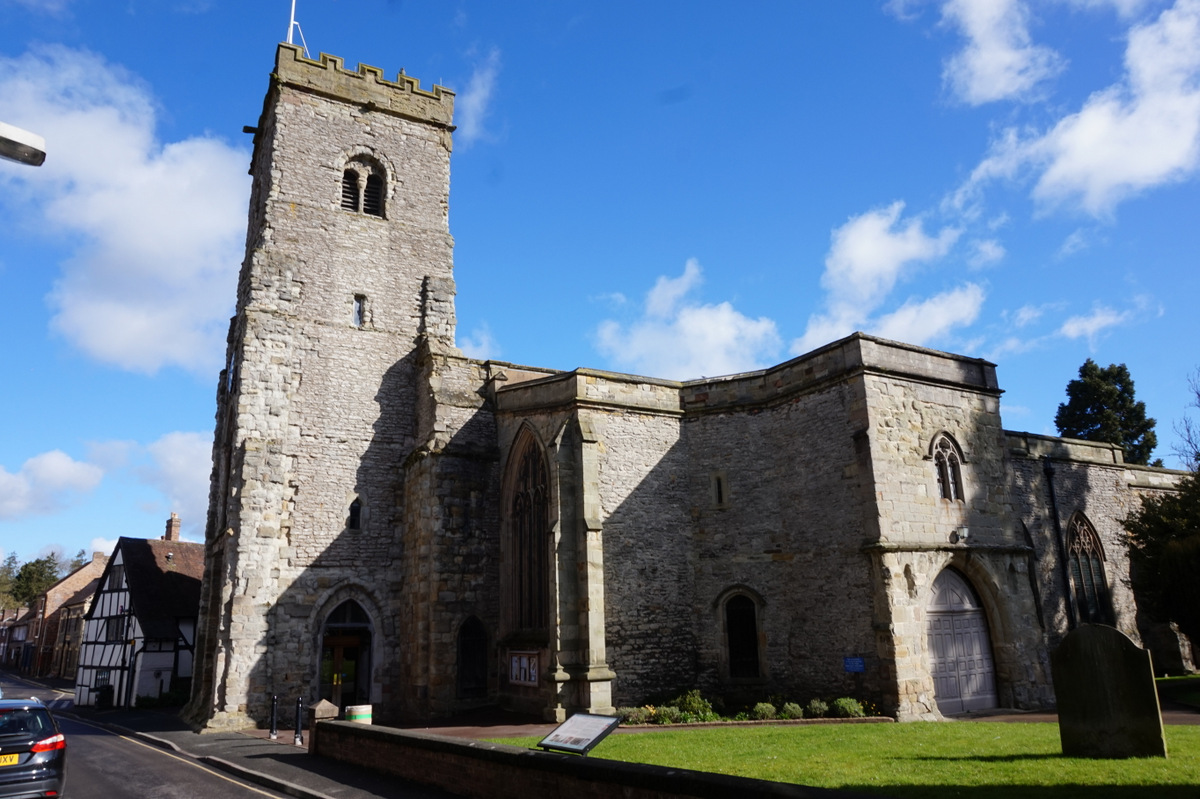
- The church in 2016
- Holy Trinity Church
- 52°35′47″N 2°33′26″W
- Location: Wilmore Street, Much Wenlock, Shropshire, England

Architecture
- Completed: Early 12th century

Holy Trinity Church in Much Wenlock, Shropshire, England. Located on Wilmore Street and dating to the early 12th century, it is now a Grade I listed building.

The oldest part is the nave, the south aisle and chapel and the tower were added in the late 12th century, and the chancel was later extended, doubling its length. The church is built in stone, and consists of a nave, a south aisle and chapel, a south porch, a chancel, and a west tower. The nave is Norman in style, and the chancel is early Perpendicular. The tower has four stages, clasping buttresses, round-arched bell openings, and an embattled parapet.

Architect Samuel Pountney Smith added windows to the south aisle and the south chapel in 1843 and 1866.

The church has a variety of war memorials. In the chancel are plaques to Lieutenant Robert Gwinn Granger, died of wounds in the Action of 7 February 1813 on HMS Amelia, another to John Arthur Greer, attached to the Ashanti Field Force, killed in attack on rebel camp at Kumasi during The War of the Golden Stool in 1900, and Lieutenant-Colonel Charles Thomas Milnes-Gaskell of the Coldstream Guards who was killed in an aircraft crash in Egypt during the Second World War in 1943, while in the west end of the nave is a memorial to townsmen of Wenlock killed in the First and Second World Wars.

William Penny Brookes, inspirer of the modern Olympic movement, is both buried and commemorated at the church. The refurbished gravestones of himself and his family are in the churchyard, surrounded by coloured iron railings surmounted by olive crowns; indoors on the west wall of the nave is a memorial tablet to Brookes on the south west side of the entrance door and a clear glass memorial window to Brookes' parents.

Alice Glaston, believed to be the youngest girl executed in England when hanged in 1546 aged 11, was recorded to be buried at the church.

== See also ==
- Listed buildings in Much Wenlock

== Sources ==
- Historic England, "Church of Holy Trinity, Much Wenlock (1053793)", National Heritage List for England
- Newman, John; Pevsner, Nikolaus (2006), Shropshire, The Buildings of England, New Haven and London: Yale University Press, ISBN 0-300-12083-4
