= Listed buildings in Little Wenlock =

Little Wenlock is a civil parish in the district of Telford and Wrekin, Shropshire, England. It contains 15 listed buildings that are recorded in the National Heritage List for England. Of these, one is at Grade II*, the middle of the three grades, and the others are at Grade II, the lowest grade. The parish contains the village of Little Wenlock and the surrounding countryside. Most of the listed buildings are houses and associated structures, cottages, farmhouses and farm buildings, a high proportion of which are timber framed and which date from the 16th and 17th centuries, and the other listing building is a church.

== Key ==
Grade	Criteria
II*	Particularly important buildings of more than special interest
II	Buildings of national importance and special interest

== Buildings ==
Name and location	Photograph	Date	Notes	Grade
St Lawrence's Church; 52.65813°N 2.52333°W		Medieval	The tower was reconstructed in 1667, and in 1822 a wide south aisle was added. In 1875 a chancel was added to the south aisle, the original nave became the north aisle, and the original chancel a vestry. The church is built in stone, and there is a blocked Norman window in the original chancel. The tower is in Perpendicular style, with an embattled parapet and a pyramidal roof with a weathervane.	II*
The Old Rectory; 52.65852°N 2.52401°W	—	c. 16th century	The house is basically timber framed, it has been completely encased in brick, and was remodelled in the 19th century. The roof is tiled with gabled ends, and there are two storeys. On the front are three bays, the outer bays projecting forward and gabled with decorative bargeboards. The central doorway has fluted pilasters, and an entablature, and the windows are sashes.	II
The Old Hall; 52.65801°N 2.52276°W	—	Late 16th century	A portion of a once larger mansion badly damaged by fire. It is in stone with a tile roof, and has two storeys and attics and three bays. The left bay is gabled and contains a wide two-storey canted bay window with mullioned and transomed windows and leaded panes. To the right is a gabled porch and another mullioned and transomed window. At the rear is a brick extension with two gables and a round-arched stair window.	II
Rose Cottage; 52.65867°N 2.52202°W	—	16th to 17th century	The cottage is timber framed with brick infill, and has a tile roof with gabled ends. There is one storey and an attic, and three bays, the right bay projecting and gabled. There are smaller gables in the left two bays, and the windows are casements.	II
The Moors; 52.64725°N 2.51561°W	—	16th to 17th century	A timber framed cottage that has been largely refaced in brick, with sandstone at the northwest end, and an extension in the 19th century. It has a tile roof and dentil eaves. There is one storey and an attic, three bays, and a rear brick wing. On the front is a modern porch, the windows are casements, and there are two gabled dormers.	II
Coalmoor Farmhouse; 52.66136°N 2.49690°W	—	17th century	Originally a timber framed cottage, a brick house was later added at right angles to the right, and the roofs are tiled. The cottage has one storey and an attic, two bays, casement windows, two gabled dormers, a gabled porch, and a doorway with pilasters and a fanlight. The house is rendered, and has two storeys and an attic, two bays, casement windows, and two gabled dormers.	II
Lower Huntington Farmhouse; 52.66925°N 2.51275°W		17th century	The farmhouse, which is timber framed, was faced in brick in the 19th century and has been rendered. It has dentil eaves and a tile roof with gable ends. There is one storey and an attic, four bays, three gables, a gabled porch, and casement windows. Inside is some exposed timber framing.	II
The Stone House; 52.65979°N 2.52162°W	—	17th century	The house is in stone and has a tile roof with gabled ends and stone copings. There are two storeys and two bays. The central doorway has an arched lintel, in the upper floor are two four-light mullioned windows, and in the ground floor the windows are modern.	II
Upper Huntington Farmhouse; 52.66942°N 2.51569°W	—	17th century	The timber framed farmhouse has been encased in brick, and has dentil eaves and a tile roof with gabled ends. There is one storey and an attic, three bays, and a brick rear wing. The windows are casements.	II
White Cottage; 52.65852°N 2.52163°W	—	17th century	The cottage is in rendered timber framing and has a tile roof with gable ends. There is one storey and attics, four bays, three gables, and casement windows.	II
Manor House; 52.65909°N 2.52278°W	—	Late 17th century	The house, which was altered in the late 19th century, is in roughcast brick with a wooden modillion eaves cornice and a tile roof with three gables. There are two storeys and an attic, and three bays. In the centre is a gabled porch, and the windows are casements.	II
Gate piers, The Old Rectory; 52.65821°N 2.52376°W	—	18th century	The gate piers flank the entrance to the drive. They are in sandstone, and are rusticated with moulded caps and large pineapple finials.	II
Home Farmhouse and outbuilding 52.66002°N 2.52000°W	—	Late 18th century	The farmhouse was extended in about 1830–40. It is in brick, and has a tiled roof with gabled ends. The main block has two storeys and an attic, and three bays, the outer bays gabled, and to the left is a two-storey one-bay extension. The doorway has pilasters and a rectangular fanlight, and the windows are sashes with flat stuccoed arches. At the rear is a single-storey outbuilding range with dentil eaves.	II
Farm buildings, Home Farm; 52.65997°N 2.52052°W	—	1800–30	The farm buildings are in brick with tiled roofs. They include byres, stabling, cowsheds, and outbuildings, and there are gates onto the road and to the north. On the road front is a segmental arched wagon entrance.	II
Lower Coalmoor Farmhouse; 52.65677°N 2.50291°W	—	Early to mid 19th century	A brick farmhouse that has a tiled roof with gabled ends. There are two storeys and three bays. The central doorway has pilasters, a semicircular fanlight and an open pediment, and the windows are sashes with segmental heads.	II
