= Shit Brook =

Stream in Shropshire, England

Coordinates: 52°35′52.60″N 2°33′15.67″W

Shit Brook is a culverted small stream in Much Wenlock, Shropshire, England.

== History ==
The brook flowing through the town was called 'Schitterbrok' by 1321 and was the main sewer until the 20th century. It ran parallel with the road leading towards Holy Trinity Church. In the 14th century it was culverted, its course now under Victoria Road, High Street, Back Lane, Bull Ring and along the north side of the Priory precinct. The diverted stream drained into the River Severn near Buildwas Abbey. When the stream was paved over to make a lane, people used it as a shortcut to get to the town's Holy Trinity Church. At the beginning of the twentieth century the borough council constructed a new sewer system in the town, Shit Brook was diverted to the new disposal works near Downs mill.

In 1540, it was known as the "Schetebrok", which was noted by John Leland. In 1847, it was listed as "Sytche" on Ordnance Survey maps, which drew conclusions that it had some relation to a similarly named stream at Burslem in Stoke-on-Trent. In the 1990s, there was a structural survey carried out on Shit Brook which discovered that the culvert was in poor condition as it had collapsed in places, which led to flooding of nearby properties. A programme to repair the culvert was proposed by Shropshire County Council Archaeology Service to refurbish it. In 2013, it was listed as a location for new flood defences to be built in the United Kingdom.

In 1994, Shit Brook was featured in an episode of Channel 4's archaeology programme Time Team.
