= The Fourteen of Meaux =

Group of French Huguenots burned in 1546

The Fourteen of Meaux were Huguenots tortured and burnt alive for starting the first Protestant church in France at Meaux in 1546. The Musée protestant records that the first Protestant church in France following Calvin's precepts was at Meaux in 1546. It was estimated there were 400 faithful living in the area. A number of them, having assembled to receive the Holy Sacrament, were arrested and were tried in Paris. Fourteen were brought back to Meaux and burned on the Place du Marché.

The church was established by one Etienne Mangin. He is believed to have been born at St-Nicolas, a commune in the Meurthe-et-Moselle department, 75 km south of Metz.

Arriving in Meaux, he had opened his house to be used as a church. He organised reformist believers to attend gatherings and to receive the Holy Sacrament from one Pierre LeClerc who was chosen as Pastor by the congregation of worshippers for his knowledge of the scriptures. They became known as 'The Gospellers of Meaux'.

Etienne Mangin and LeClerc were said to be part of a deputation from Meaux who visited Calvin in Strasbourg in 1546 shortly before their execution, thinking to establish among themselves a small church of a certain model mainly based on the Strasbourg example which was, at that time, famous far and wide for its religion. Meaux was eventually seen as the centre from which Calvin-inspired Protestantism could spread over all of France according to Jean Crespin, a historian of Protestant martyrs.

It was not known when Etienne Mangin first became interested in the Reform Movement, but Mangin family history attributes property at Meaux to Etienne and it is apparent that he had a house in the market place with a long garden abutting on to the ramparts.

On 8 September 1546, Etienne's reformist activities, being branded heretical by the Catholic Church, caused his downfall. When they had just finished celebrating the last supper, a descent was made on the congregation and sixty people were arrested and sent to Paris to be tried by Parliament. They were subjected 'to hideous torments carefully selected for their severity'. On 4 October, a sentence was pronounced: fourteen were to be tortured and burned alive; five to be flogged and banished; ten, all women, were set free while the remainder were to undergo graded forms of penance.

Mangin and LeClerc, after severe torture, had their tongues crudely cut out before being burned at the stake.

It was decreed by the same court that 'the house of the aforementioned Mangin should be entirely razed to the ground as a perpetual mark of their impiety and a chapel built in which mass would be celebrated each Thursday'

Rather than a chapel, there remains a fairly undistinguished building on the site to this day at 73, Rue du Marché with a plaque to commemorate it as the site of Etienne Mangin's house where the first Reformed Church of France was started. The plaque bears the following inscription (translated):

"Here stood the house of ETIENNE MANGIN in which was constructed the first Reformed Church of France. In front of this location 14 Reformists, arrested during a cult, were burned on October 8, 1546 at the decree of the Parliament in Paris on October 4, 1546. Offered by the City of Meaux 1985."
