= John Dean (convict) =

8- or 9-year-old English boy executed in 1629

- Born: c. 1620
- Died: c. February 1629 (aged 8 or 9); Abingdon, England
- Resting place: Unknown
- Status: Executed by hanging
- Conviction: Arson
- Penalty: Death

Details
- Date apprehended: 23 February 1629

John Marshall Dean (c. 1620 – c. 23 February 1629) was an 8- or 9-year-old English boy who was hanged during the reign of Charles I. He is likely the youngest person ever to be executed in England. Dean was accused of setting fire to two barns or houses (Note: Sources differ.) in the nearby town of Windsor, and was subsequently indicted, arraigned, and convicted on the same day, and was "hanged accordingly". It is unknown if anyone was harmed in the alleged acts of arson, but the judge presiding over the case, Mr. Justice Whitlock, said Dean had shown signs of "malice, revenge, craft, and cunning". Even for the time, it was unusual and frowned upon by society in England for someone so young to be executed, but Dean was nevertheless sentenced to death and executed soon after.

== See also ==
- Capital punishment in the United Kingdom
- Alice Glaston, 11-year old girl who was the youngest girl executed in the history of England
- Hannah Ocuish
- Mary (slave)
