= William Penny Brookes =

British doctor, campaigner and a progenitor of the modern olympic movement

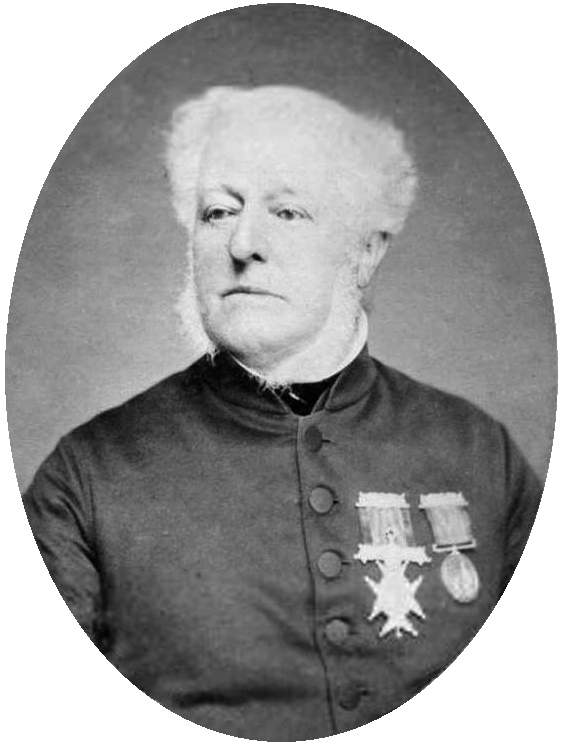
- William Penny Brookes in 1875
- Born: William Penny Brookes; 13 August 1809; Much Wenlock, Shropshire, England
- Died: 11 December 1895 (aged 86); Much Wenlock
- Resting place: Holy Trinity Church, Much Wenlock
- Education: Doctor of medicine, surgeon
- Occupations: Surgeon, physician, magistrate, apothecary, entrepreneur
- Known for: founder of Wenlock Olympian Society Annual Games, founding father of International Olympic Movement
- Website: http://www.wenlock-olympian-society.org.uk

William Penny Brookes (13 August 1809 – 11 December 1895) was an English surgeon, magistrate, botanist, and educationalist especially known for founding the Wenlock Olympian Games, inspiring the modern Olympic Games, and for his promotion of physical education and personal betterment.

Brookes was born, lived, worked and died in the small market town of Much Wenlock, Shropshire, England. He was apprenticed to his father, Dr William Brookes, and later studied in London, England; Paris, France and Padua, Italy, before returning home to Much Wenlock in 1831.

Brookes was a social reformer, who campaigned to give opportunities for what he termed "every grade of man" to expand their knowledge and become mentally and physically fit. He established the Wenlock Agricultural Reading Society (WARS) in 1841 to provide the opportunity of acquiring knowledge but especially to provide opportunities for the working classes. He promoted athletic exercises, ranging from running to football, by holding an annual games offering prizes for sports competitions. Later, competitions for "cultural" events were added. This opened the door for the working classes to enter competitive sport which, in the United Kingdom, had previously been the privilege of only the elite. Following the 1860 Games, the Olympian Class separated from WARS due to an irrevocable difference of opinion between the two organisations, and it changed its name to Wenlock Olympian Society (WOS) to emphasise that it was now independent.

His lifelong campaign to get Physical Education on the school curriculum brought him into contact with Baron Pierre de Coubertin. In 1890, the young French aristocrat visited Much Wenlock and stayed with Dr Brookes at his lifelong home in Wilmore Street. The Society staged a games especially for the baron and, inspired by the event and his discussions with Brookes, Coubertin wrote: "If the Olympic Games that Modern Greece has not yet been able to revive still survives there today, it is due, not to a Greek, but to Dr W P Brookes".

== Life ==
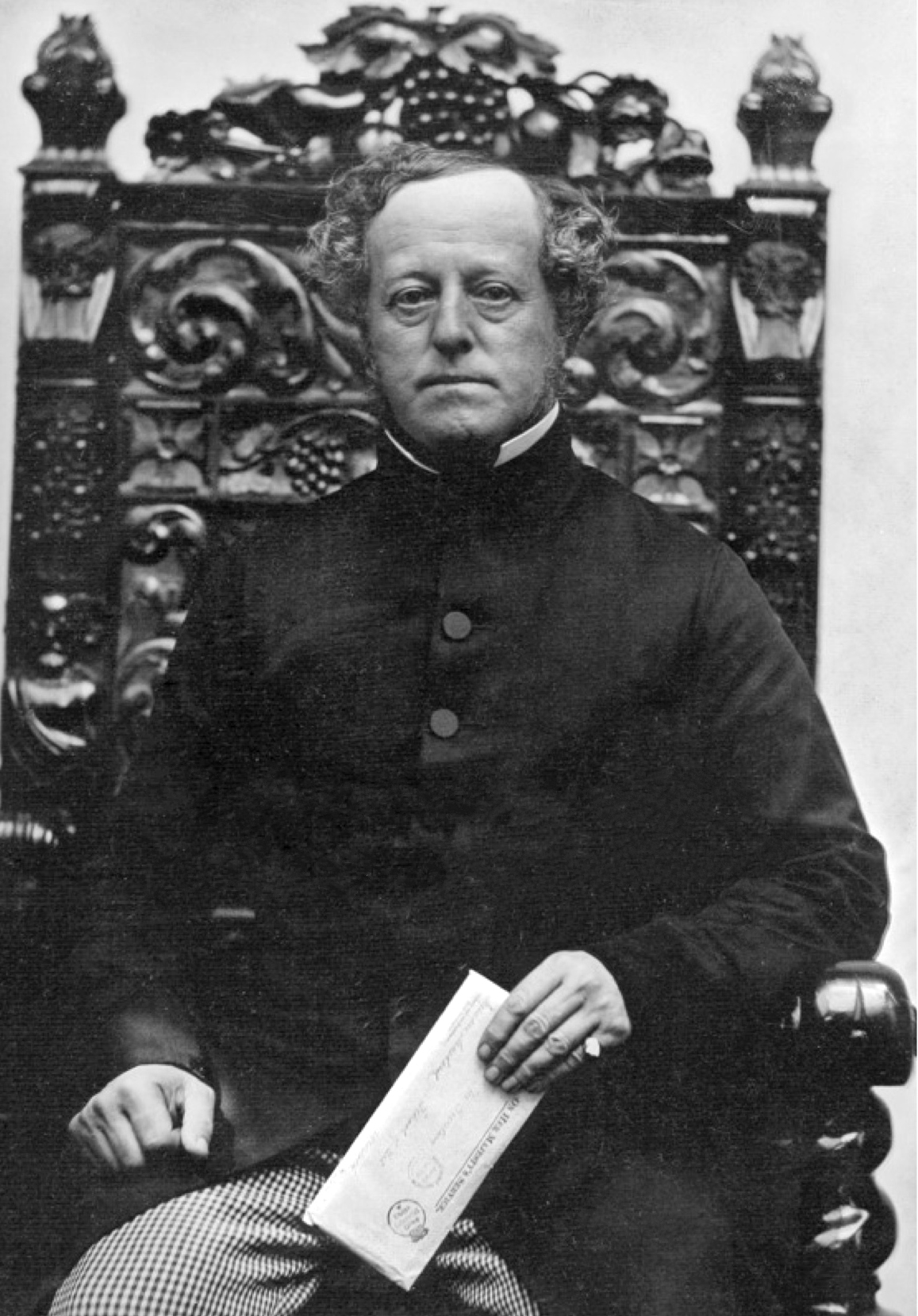
William Penny Brookes

William Penny Brookes was born in Much Wenlock, where his father, William Brookes, was a local doctor. He was apprenticed to his father on 12 August 1824, studied at St Thomas' Hospital, London from September 1829 to May 1830, then studied in the hospitals of Paris, until the end of August 1830. Later he went to Padua in Italy famous for the Orto botanico di Padova, 16th century herb gardens. There he studied herbal medicines and botany, although not as a student of Padua University, and was there for about six months before returning home to Much Wenlock at the end of February 1831. During his medical studies in Paris he learned of his father's death. When he arrived back at Much Wenlock in 1831, he returned to the family home and took over his father's large medical practice.

As a botanist, he provided information on plants growing around Wenlock and also Shropshire for Charles Hulbert's The History and Description of the County of Salop (1837), and William Allport Leighton's Flora of Shropshire (1841). His herbarium is held at the Much Wenlock Town Council's archives.

He also became actively involved in the local community, becoming a Justice of the Peace in 1841 and remaining an active magistrate for over 40 years. Also in 1841, he instigated the setting up of the Wenlock Agricultural Reading Society (WARS), with its early lending library "for the promotion and diffusion of useful information". From these endeavours evolved various interest groups called "classes" including art, music, botany and subsequently an Olympian Class. All the WARS "classes", the lectures they held and the library were open to "every grade of man", at Brookes' insistence.

"The Olympian Class" was set up in 1850 "for the promotion of the moral, physical and intellectual improvement of the inhabitants of the town and neighbourhood of Wenlock and especially of the working classes, by the encouragement of outdoor recreation, and by the award of prizes annually at public meetings for skill in Athletic exercise and proficiency in Intellectual and industrial attainments". The first Games meeting was held in October 1850, and included competitions in classic athletics and also country sports such as quoits, football and cricket.

When these first Wenlock Olympian Games were staged in 1850, there was heavy criticism of Brookes's insistence that the Games was open to the working classes and thus have a large number of scantily-dressed young men performing in front of women. It was felt that such an event would cause drunkenness, rioting, lewd behaviour, and that men would leave their wives. The Games were a huge success and none of the threatened disturbances occurred. The Games quickly expanded, and within a few years it was attracting competitors from as far away as London and Liverpool.

From 1852, the Society ran a library for working-class subscribers and interest groups called "classes" met at the Corn Exchange, the Wenlock Agricultural Reading Society (WARS) headquarters for the benefit of the people of the vast Borough of Wenlock and its neighbourhood. Brookes was himself elected to annual office in the Society as: Secretary in years 1850 and 1851, 1860 and 1874; Treasurer 1858 and 1859, 1870, and 1880 to 1882; and President in 1854 and 1855, 1857, 1862 to 1867, and 1891.

Brookes was a Philhellene, who admired the perceived definition of Ancient Greek democratic ideals, that all men were equal and allowed and indeed expected to vote, take an active part in governance, and compete in sport. In reality, this was a misconception as only free-born adult male citizens (approximately 20% of the population) were permitted to vote, etc. (see also (Athenian democracy). In nineteenth century Britain it was usually young men educated at public schools or the sons of professionals who had the opportunities to enter competitive sport. Brookes applied what was commonly thought to be the ethos of the ancient Olympic Games – that they were open to "every grade of man," and added to this mediaeval chivalry: he wanted working-class men to compete in sport but to exercise fair play/chivalry at all levels of competition.

In 1858, Brookes established contact with the organisers of an Olympic Games revival in Athens sponsored by Greek businessman Evangelis Zappas. The Olympian Class sent a prize of £10 which was awarded to the winner of the Seven-Fold Foot Race, Petros Velissariou (an ethnic Greek from Smyrna, the former Greek city which at this time was in the Ottoman Empire). Velissariou was made the first Honorary Member of the Wenlock Olympian Class.

The 1859 Wenlock Olympian Games were much expanded following nine years of work to build up subscriptions and attracted more competitors with new competitions and brought in spectators through more organised pageantry and better advertising. The following year, even more people came as there was a well-publicised opening celebration for the laying of the first stone for Much Wenlock's first railway which was another of Brookes' projects. This, coupled with the discovery of the Roman city of Viroconium in the village of Wroxeter and the inclusion of a whole range of spectacular competitions open to regiments from the newly instigated national Volunteer Rifle Corps encouraged a further increase in competitors and spectators. Also, inspired by the revived Greek Olympic Games, Brookes added "throwing the javelin" and writing an "Ode to the Olympian Games" to the Wenlock Olympian games programme. In the November following the 1860 Games, the Olympian Class separated from WARS and changed its name to Wenlock Olympian Society (WOS), due to an irrevocable difference of opinion between some members of the WARS Committee and Brookes (who was supported by his Olympian Committee). In that same year, Brookes instigated the setting up of the annual Shropshire Olympian Games which were intended to rotate venue from town to town around the county.

In 1865, Brookes was instrumental in setting up the National Olympian Association based in Liverpool. Their first Olympian Games, a national event, held in 1866 at The Crystal Palace, London, was a surprising success and attracted a crowd of over ten thousand people. W.G. Grace, who would later gain fame as a cricketer, won the hurdles event. The Amateur Athletic Club, later to become the Amateur Athletics Association, was quickly formed as a rival organisation to the National Olympian Association. In 1877, Brookes requested a prize from Greece to mark Queen Victoria's 40th jubilee. In response, King George I of Greece sent a silver cup which was presented at the Shropshire Olympian Games held that year in Shrewsbury. In 1881, Brookes was again in contact with the Greek government, when he tried to instigate an Olympic Games in Athens open to international competitors. Sadly this attempt failed as Greece had many pressing political problems.

Brookes was also heavily involved in many other local activities. He became Chairman of the Wenlock Gas Company in 1856, which first brought lighting to the town. He was a Commissioner for Roads and Taxes, Overseer of the Poor, and also became a Director of both the Much Wenlock and Severn Junction Railway Company and the later Wenlock Railway Company. The first train to Much Wenlock was arranged to coincide with the Wenlock Olympian Games of 1861. He was manager of the Much Wenlock National School, where, in 1871, he helped introduce drill and physical exercise into the curriculum. He believed that as children at the school were likely to be employed in jobs that required physical strength, such as farming or quarrying, development of their physical strength was equally as important as their mental ability.

In 1889, he invited Baron Pierre de Coubertin, the organiser of an International Congress on Physical Education, to Much Wenlock. He accepted, and in October 1890, he went to stay at the Brookes family home in Wilmore Street for several days. A meeting of the Wenlock Olympian Games was held in Coubertin's honour with much pageantry, followed by a dinner held at The Raven Hotel. Today The Raven Hotel has a display of several photographs about WOS by kind permission of the Society, including copies of original letters from Coubertin to Brookes. On his return to France, Coubertin gave a glowing account of his stay in an article, "Les Jeux Olympiques à Much Wenlock", and referred to his host's efforts to revive the Olympics. He wrote : "If the Olympic Games that Modern Greece has not yet been able to revive still survives there today, it is due, not to a Greek, but to Dr W P Brookes". Although Coubertin later sought to downplay Brookes's influence, he corresponded with him for several years and sent him a gold medal (made of silver) in 1891 to be presented to the winner of the Tilting Competition. Coubertin went on to set up the International Olympic Committee in 1894, which was followed by the Athens 1896 Olympic Games that came under the auspices of the Committee. Brookes died just four months before the latter Games.

== Legacy ==
The Wenlock Olympian Society maintains his original ideals, and continues to organise annual Olympian Games. The Live arts takes place in March each year, and the sports takes place in July. William Brookes School in Much Wenlock is named after him. In 1994, the then President of the International Olympic Committee, Juan Antonio Samaranch, laid a wreath on the grave of William Penny Brookes saying, "I came to pay homage and tribute to Dr Brookes, who really was the founder of the modern Olympic Games".
