= Inclosure (Consolidation) Act 1801 =

Act of the Parliament of the United Kingdom

Inclosure (Consolidation) Act 1801 (Note: The citation of this act by this short title was authorised by section 1 of, and the first schedule to, the Short Titles Act 1896. Due to the repeal of those provisions it is now authorised by section 19(2) of the Interpretation Act 1978.)
- Act of Parliament
- Parliament of the United Kingdom
- Long title: An act for consolidating in one act certain provisions usually inserted in acts of inclosure; and for facilitating the mode of proving the several facts usually required on the passing of such acts.
- Citation: 41 Geo. 3. (U.K.) c. 109
- Territorial extent: United Kingdom

Dates
- Royal assent: 2 July 1801
- Commencement: 2 July 1801 (Note: The Acts of Parliament (Commencement) Act 1793.)
- Repealed: 9 August 1899
Other legislation
Repealed by	Commons Act 1899
Relates to	Inclosure Act 1773

Status: Repealed

Text of statute as originally enacted

The Inclosure (Consolidation) Act 1801 (41 Geo. 3. (U.K.) c. 109) was an act of the Parliament of the United Kingdom that consolidated enactments relating to enclosures in the United Kingdom.

The act provided a common framework and standard conditions for subsequent enclosures.

== Subsequent developments ==
The whole act was repealed by section 23 of, and the second schedule to, the Commons Act 1899 (62 & 63 Vict. c. 30), which came into force on 9 August 1899.
