= Elizabeth Lowys =

English woman accused of witchcraft (died 1565)

Elizabeth Lowys (died 30 March 1565), was an English woman executed for witchcraft. She is known as the first woman to be executed for witchcraft in England after the passing of the Witchcraft Act 1563.

She came from Great Waltham in Essex and she was married to the farmer John Lowys of Chelmsford, and was active as a cunning woman.

== First church court trial ==
She was initially accused of making people ill by Phillipa Deale, Agnes Devonshe and her own husband. She was brought before the archdeacon's court on evidence collated by the local vicar Brian Neadham in June 1564 but she was not convicted.

== Second church court trial ==
However, during the first trial, she was accused of having caused the death of Robert Wodley and his baby John of Chelmsford and the child John Canall of Colchester by use of witchcraft. She was retried.

What sets her case apart from many other famous witchcraft accusations is the existence of witness depositions from the initial church court hearing. These depositions, preserved at the Essex's Records office, offer a glimpse into the community dynamics, rumors, and social tensions that shaped the case against her.

One of the first witnesses to speak against Lowys was Henry Gale, whose account, although focused on a dispute over stolen chickens, helps create a wider picture of the relationships she had with her neighbours. It suggests that Lowys may have already been involved in arguments and ongoing tensions with them before the accusations of witchcraft formally surfaced.

Secondly, Phillipa Deale accused Lowys of bewitching her after a dispute over spinning work, which was a five year old incident, raising suspicions of a setup.

And lastly, Agnes Devonshe's testimony escalated the accusations to murder- claiming Lowys bewitched John Cannell, a child who died after suffering from a rare and painful condition, most likely Sydenham's Chorea. Although, the Cannel's did not blame Lowys for their son's death. Sydenham's Chorea is a neurological disorder in children. It's characterized by involuntary, jerky movements, especially in the limbs and face and can also involve emotional instability and other neuropsychiatric symptoms. At the time, people would not have known the scientific explanation behind the disorder, as most things were dealt with by the church, and was mostly mistaken for curses by the devil, etc. Despite Agnes consulting Lowys for healing and following her advice to see a cunning woman, she attributes subsequent misfortunes, including the death of her pigs and illness of her family, to Lowys witchcraft.

The court proceedings were interrupted by a command from Magistrate Milmay, transferring Elizabeth's case to the civil court due to new allegations under the Elizabethan witchcraft law. If this church court proceeding had not been interrupted, she would most likely have been deemed innocent.

== Civil court trial ==
Information on the civil court proceedings is very little, but we know she now faced three charges of murder: John Cannel, Robert Wadley and his infant son John. Further charges suggest a concerted effort to secure a conviction. She was sentenced to death for "murder by magic" in June 1564. Her execution was postponed because she falsely claimed to be pregnant. A jury of matrons, which included Agnes Devonshe, determined she was not pregnant. Despite pleading not guilty, Elizabeth Lowys was found guilty on all three counts. Elizabeth Lowys was executed.
