= Alice Glaston =

11-year old English girl executed in 1546

- Born: c. 1533; Little Wenlock, Shropshire, England
- Died: 1544 (aged 11); Much Wenlock, Shropshire, England

Alice Glaston (c. 1533 – 1544) was an 11-year-old English girl from Little Wenlock who may have been hanged in Much Wenlock, Shropshire, England, under the reign of Henry VIII. The evidence surrounding how Alice met her death is provided from a single source and open to interpretation.

The Cambrian Journal dated 1861 provides a transcription of local parish registers written by the vicar of Much Wenlock, Sir Thomas Butler in the 1500's. This text includes a list of burials with dates, grouped by year, including the following written in the year 1544: "Here was buried John Dod of the parish of Little Wenlock, who was hanged here, as also Alice Glaston, 11 yrs of age, of the parish of Little Wenlock, and Wm. Harper, a tailor."

This statement suggests Alice was buried on the same day as John Dod (who was hanged) and William Harper (a tailor). An entry further down on the same page doesn't mention Alice by name, but states "(new paragraph) 1546. 13 Apr. Three convicts buried; one a girl of 11 years old." However, the journal entries are grouped by year and reference to the burial of Alice Glaston appears under the year 1544, two years before this entry was made in the parish register.

The introduction of the first Witchcraft Act three years before her death, has fuelled unsubstantiated claims that Alice was hung for the crime of witchcraft. To date, no such claims have been made about either John Dod or William Harper.

The first Witchcraft Act of 1541 introduced serious penalties for witchcraft and was the first act to define witchcraft as a felony, punishable by death. Witch trials in England were however not common until the end of the 16th century and early 17th century when James VI and I ascended to the throne. According to Joyce Gibson, the first person hanged for witchcraft in England was likely to be Elizabeth Lowys who was tried in July 1564 for killing a child by occult means. The most commonly identified first person to have been executed as a witch in England is Agnes Waterhouse in 1566, and whose name appears in Judy Chicago's feminist history art installation The Dinner Party.

Present-day assumptions that Alice was hanged for the crime of witchcraft may have taken root following the release of The Spirit Child, a fictional supernatural radio play performed in October 2014. A feature film 'Dreams of Eleven Year Old Witch' produced by Vitality Entertainment is currently in production. The film has been written by J Ashley and directed by Harry Patterson with child actress Alia McLeish making her debut in the leading role as Alice Glaston. The age classification rating is not known at this time but the film is due to feature "distressing scenes, violence and death."

== See also ==
- Capital punishment in the United Kingdom
- John Dean, 8- or 9-year-old boy who was the youngest person executed in the history of England
- Elizabeth Lowys one of the earliest recorded executions for the crime of witchcraft
- Agnes Waterhouse widely considered the first person to be executed for the crime of witchcraft in England
