= Much Wenlock =

Town and parish in Shropshire, England

Coordinates: 52.5966°N 2.5580°W

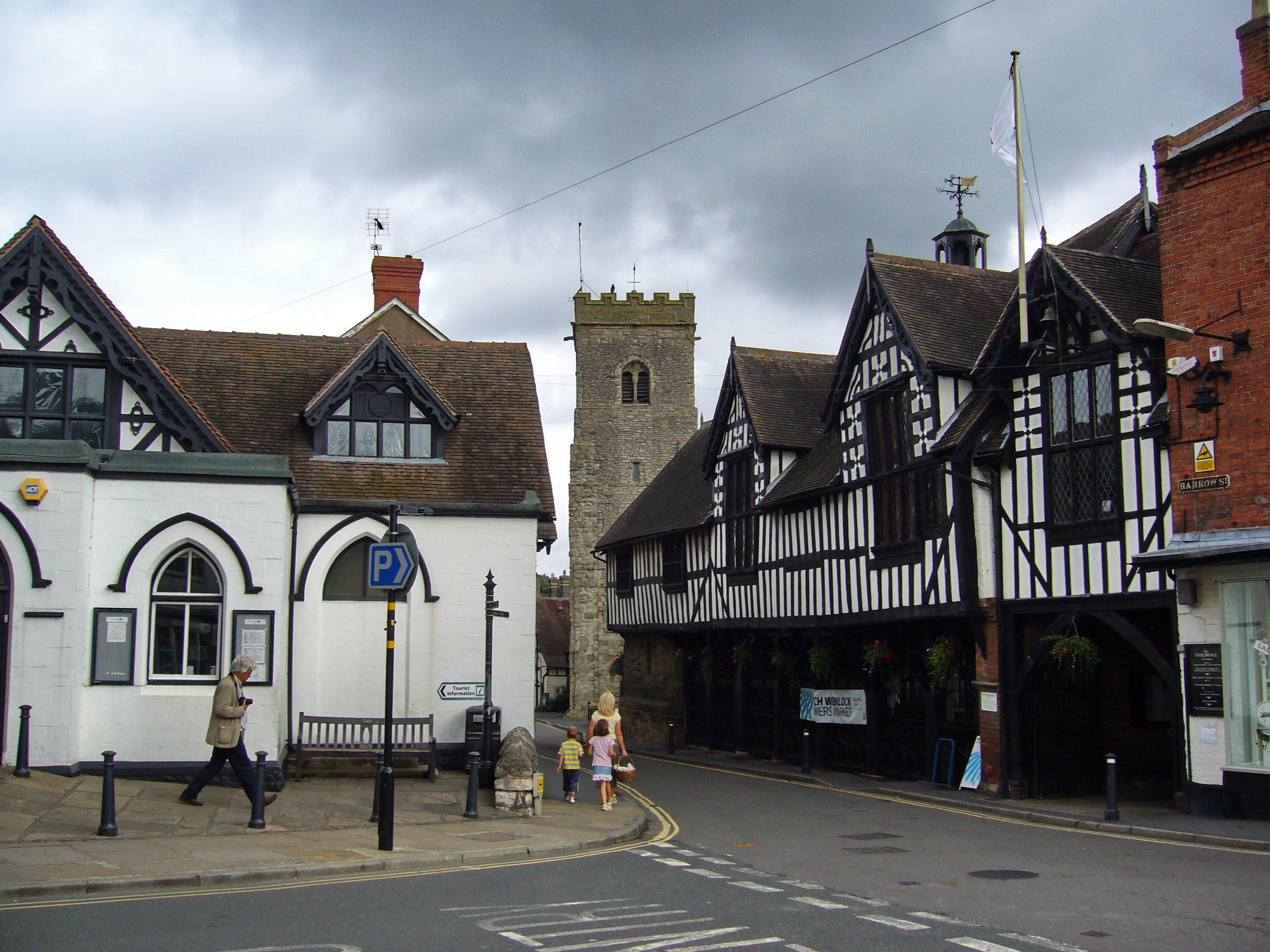
- Holy Trinity Church (centre) and the Guildhall (right)

- Location within Shropshire
- Population: 2,877 (2011)
- OS grid reference: SO623997
- Civil parish: Much Wenlock
- Unitary authority: Shropshire
- Ceremonial county: Shropshire
- Region: West Midlands
- Country: England
- Sovereign state: United Kingdom
- Post town: MUCH WENLOCK
- Postcode district: TF13
- Dialling code: 01952
- Police: West Mercia
- Fire: Shropshire
- Ambulance: West Midlands
- UK Parliament: South Shropshire

Much Wenlock is a market town and parish in Shropshire, England; it is situated on the A458 road between Shrewsbury and Bridgnorth. Nearby, to the north-east, is the Ironbridge Gorge and Telford. The civil parish includes the villages of Homer (1 mile (1.6 km) north of the town), Wyke (2 miles (3 km) north-east), Atterley (2 miles (3 km) south-east), Stretton Westwood (2 miles (3 km) south-west) and Bourton (3 miles (5 km) south-west). The population of the civil parish, according to the 2001 Census, was 2,605, increasing to 2,877 by 2011.

Notable historic attractions in the town are Wenlock Priory, Wenlock Edge, Holy Trinity Church and the Guildhall. The Wenlock Olympian Games, established by William Penny Brookes in 1850, are centred in the town. Brookes is credited as a founding father of the modern Olympic Games and one of the London 2012 Summer Olympics mascots was named Wenlock, after the town.

== Toponym ==
Much Wenlock is historically the chief town of the ancient borough of Wenlock. "Much" was added to distinguish it from the nearby Little Wenlock and to show it is the larger of the two settlements. The name Wenlock probably comes from the Celtic name Wininicas, meaning "white area" (in reference to the limestone of Wenlock Edge), plus the Old English loca, meaning "enclosed place". The town was recorded in the Domesday Book of 1086 as Wenloch.

== History ==
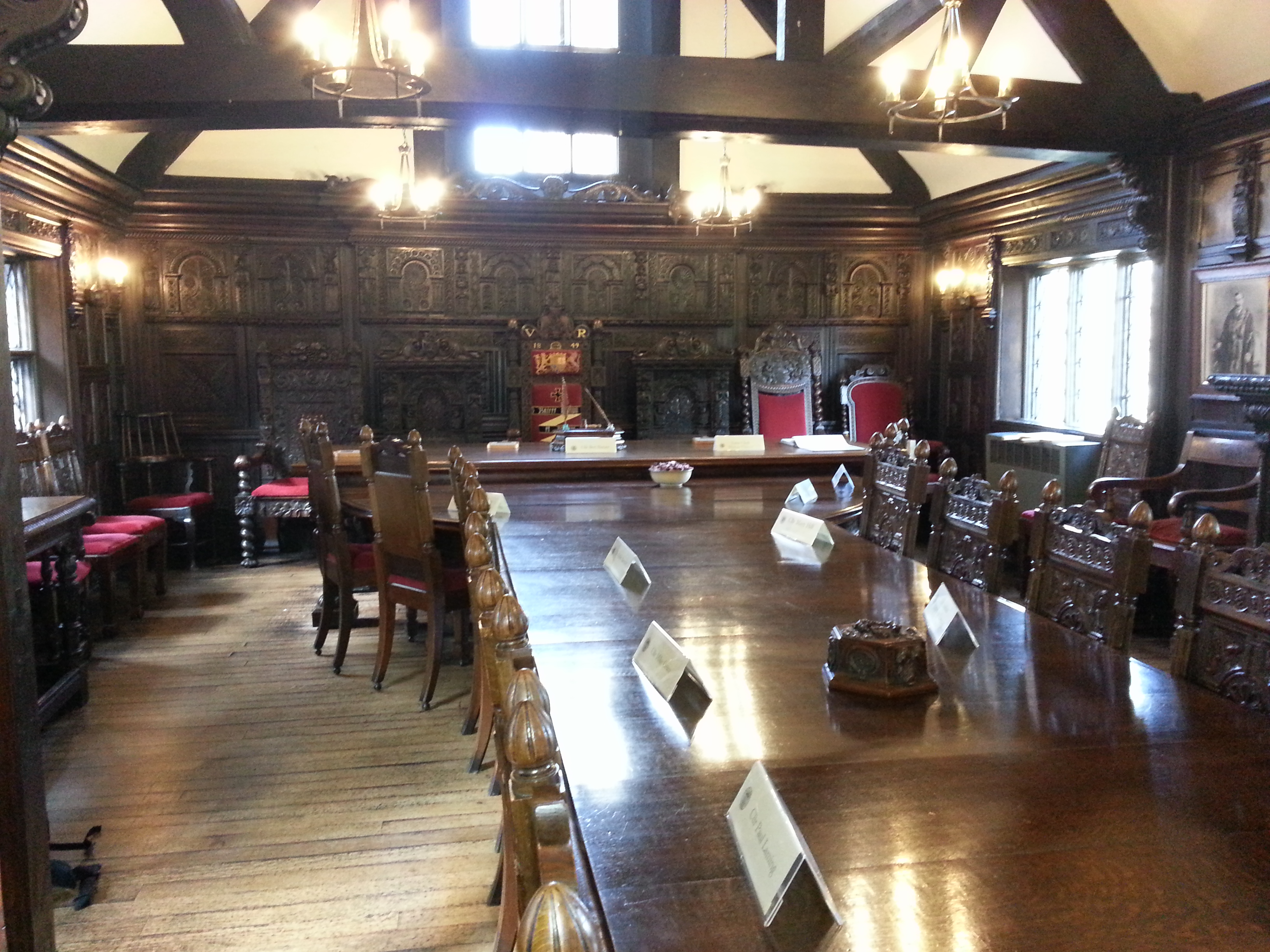
Historic council chamber, Guildhall, Much Wenlock

=== Early history ===
Richard Fletcher mentions Much Wenlock as one of the possible locations where a Sub-Roman British Christian community may have survived the Anglo-Saxon occupation and eventually integrated with the conquerors and influenced their culture.

The town of Wenlock is known to have grown up around an abbey or monastery founded around 680 by Merewalh, a son of King Penda of Mercia, with the small town within its parish boundaries. King Penda installed his daughter Milburga as abbess in 687. Milburga of Wenlock was credited with many miraculous works. The abbey flourished until around 874 when it is thought that a Danish Viking attack occurred.

The Domesday Book records the manor as 'Wenloch' and forming part of the hundred of Patton. It was already at this time a fairly large settlement, with 73 households. The abbey is also recorded in the book, separately. In the 11th century another religious house was built on the same site by Leofric, Earl of Mercia and Countess Godiva his wife. In the 12th century this was replaced by a Cluniac priory, established by Roger de Montgomery after the Norman Conquest, the ruins of which can still be seen and which is now in the care of English Heritage.

Early in the 12th century the hundred of Patton was merged with Culvestan to form the hundred of Munslow, but in 1198 Much Wenlock, together with the other manors held by Wenlock Priory, was transferred to the hundredal jurisdiction of the Liberty of Wenlock (also known as Wenlock Franchise).

The Manor of Much Wenlock belonged to the Cluniac Priory until the dissolution of the monasteries in 1540 when it passed to the Lawley family, and then by marriage of Ursula Lawley to the Bertie family.

=== Borough of Wenlock ===
In 1468 Edward IV granted the men of Much Wenlock a charter forming the Borough of Wenlock, at the request of Sir John Wenlock, and "in consideration of the laudable services which the men of the town performed in assisting the king to gain possession of the crown." The charter was confirmed in 1547 by Henry VIII after Wenlock Priory was suppressed in the Dissolution of the Monasteries in 1539. The charter was again confirmed in 1631 by Charles I.

Over the years the borough asserted jurisdiction over the liberty of Wenlock. The lands of the liberty included rural areas and a number of detached parts well outside the town, and this resulted in an unusual, geographically dispersed borough. At its height, it was – by area – the largest borough in England outside London and encompassed several of the towns that now constitute Telford. The borough had unusual boundaries, covering Much Wenlock itself, but also Little Wenlock, Broseley and Ironbridge, a total area of 71 square miles (180 km^{2}). In 1836 the borough was reformed as a municipal borough under the Municipal Corporations Act 1835, and lost some of its rural areas and detached parts. The borough was further reduced in size in 1889, and was finally abolished in 1966.

=== Later history ===
11-year-old Alice Glaston from Little Wenlock may have been hanged together with two men in Much Wenlock in 1544, for an unknown crime. The evidence surrounding how Alice met her death is provided from a single source and open to interpretation. The Cambrian Journal dated 1861 provides a transcription of local parish registers written by the vicar of Much Wenlock, Sir Thomas Butler. This text provides a list of burials clearly marked by year, including the following from 1544.

"Here was buried John Dod of the parish of Little Wenlock, who was hanged here, as also Alice Glaston, 11 yrs of age, of the parish of Little Wenlock, and Wm. Harper, a tailor."

Sir Thomas Wolryche, 1st Baronet (1598–1668) was an English landowner and politician who sat in the House of Commons for Wenlock between 1621 and 1625. He fought in the Royalist army in the English Civil War, serving as military governor of Bridgnorth.

In 1714, the Manor of Much Wenlock was held by Viscount Gage, who sold it to the Williams-Wynn family.

In the 19th century the town and much of the surrounding land came into the possession of James Milnes Gaskell, from his wife's family the Williams-Wynns. James was MP for Wenlock for many years. His son Charles Milnes Gaskell restored the Priory lodging as a home with his wife Lady Catherine, daughter of the Earl of Portsmouth. There they entertained many famous people of the day, writers, politicians, artists and explorers, among them Thomas Hardy, Henry Adams, Henry James, Thomas Woolner, Henry Morton Stanley, Isabella Bird and Philip Webb.

Much Wenlock has become known as the birthplace of Wenlock Olympian Games set up by William Penny Brookes and his Wenlock Olympian Society (WOS) in 1850. In 1861 he was also instrumental in setting up the Shropshire Olympian Games and later in 1866, the National Olympian Games. Dr Brookes is credited as a founding father of the Modern Olympic Games. In 1890 it was the turn of the Raven Hotel to be the venue for the annual post Wenlock Olympian Games' dinner, and Baron Pierre de Coubertin was the guest of honour. Copies of some of the WOS's archive images are on display in the hotel, including letters from Coubertin to Brookes. The Wenlock Olympian Games, a nine-day event staged on eight sites across Shropshire, are still held annually during July, and are still organised by WOS. Much Wenlock's secondary school is named William Brookes School after Dr Brookes.

The London 2012 Summer Olympics mascot was named Wenlock to honour Brookes, WOS and Much Wenlock. On 30 May 2012, the Olympic flame of the 2012 Summer Olympics, was carried through Much Wenlock to acknowledge the founding footsteps of Brookes.

=== Recent times ===
When the Borough was abolished in 1966 the core Wenlock parts became part of the Bridgnorth Rural District, with other parts also going to Dawley Urban District and to Wellington Rural District. In 1974 Much Wenlock joined Bridgnorth District until it was abolished in 2009. It is now represented in the unitary Shropshire Council.

In 1983, actress Gabrielle Drake and her husband purchased Much Wenlock Manor and restored the Priory lodging.

Much Wenlock was the location for the third broadcast episode (the first filmed) of the first series of the archaeology television programme Time Team in 1994. In 1997 the Time Team returned for a revisit in their first Christmas Special.

In 2019, Much Wenlock was featured by The Sunday Times as one of the best places to live in the UK.

In May 2023 a site near the town was the location for the discovery, by metal detectorist Richard Brock from Somerset, of "Hiro's Nugget", the largest gold nugget ever found in England. It is estimated to be worth over £30,000.

== Churches ==
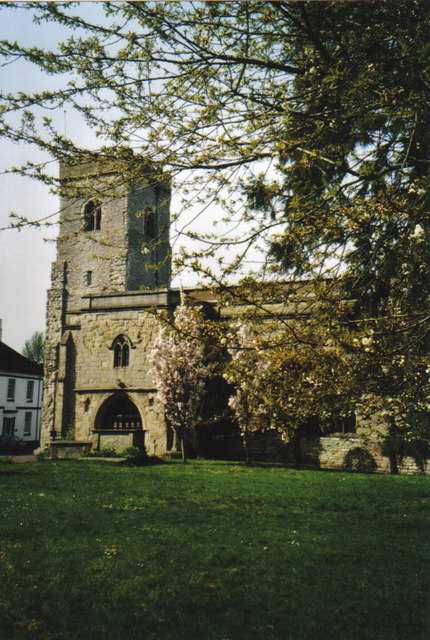
Holy Trinity Church

Holy Trinity Church, in Wilmore Street, is the Anglican parish church. The first church on this site was built in Anglo-Saxon times. The present church dates from 1150 and was built by the Cluniac monks from Wenlock Priory. Features of interest include the plain Norman tower which had a spire until early in the 20th century, and a memorial inside the church to W. P. Brookes as well as the refurbished family gravestones in the churchyard. The churchyard is a large, open, green space with some tall trees. The Shit Brook ran along the road towards the church before it was culverted. There is also a Methodist church in King Street.

== Other buildings ==
Other architectural attractions include the 16th-century Much Wenlock Guildhall, and the mid-19th century Much Wenlock Corn Exchange.

== Cultural associations ==
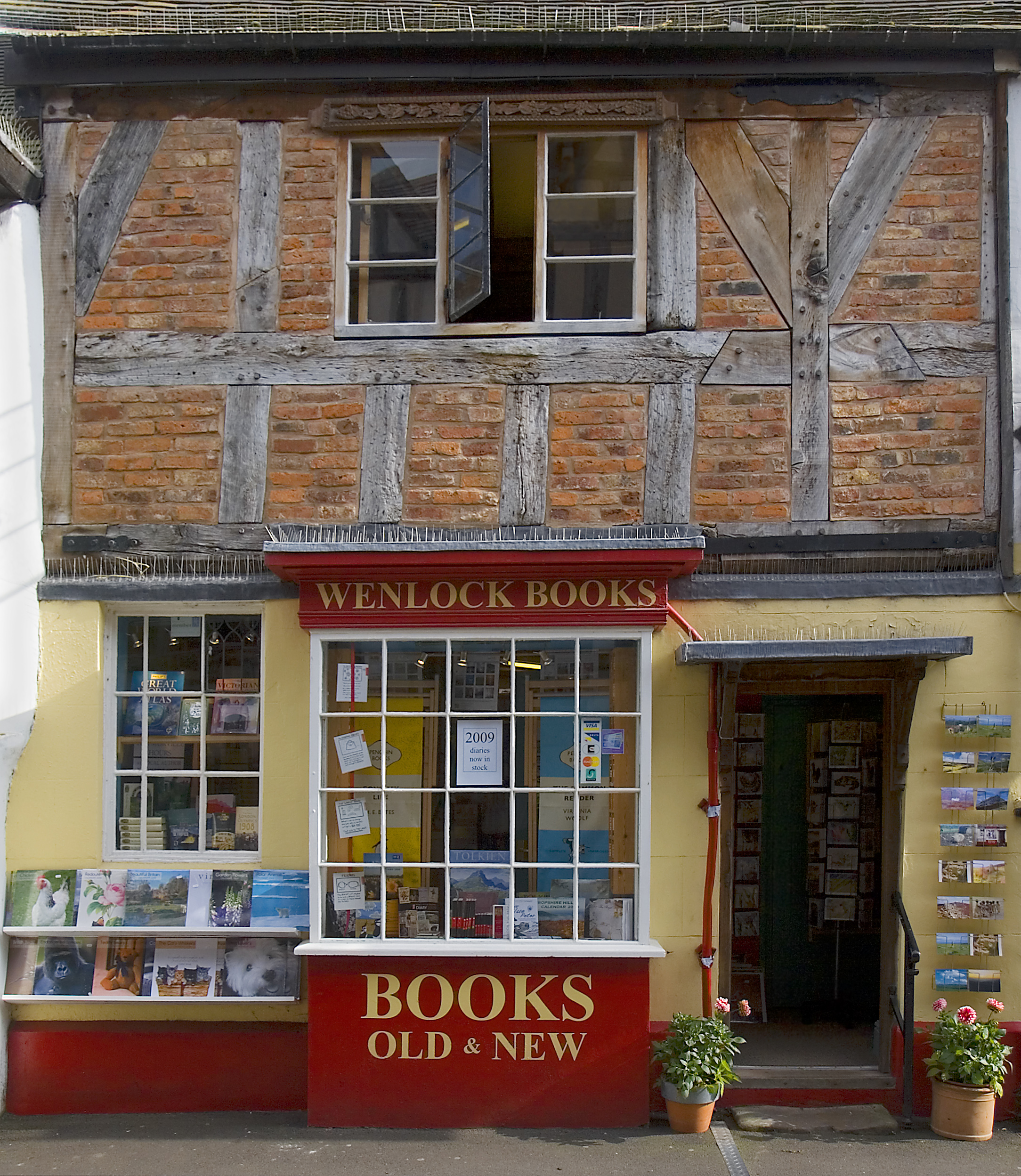
Bookshop in Much Wenlock

- St. Milburga's Well was supposed to cure eye diseases and the town was a destination popular for medieval pilgrims, coming to worship at St Milburga's Shrine.
- The Victorian era romantic painter and sculptor Robert Bateman (1842–1922) lived near Much Wenlock, at the 16th century Benthall Hall. In 1907 Walter Crane described his painting as "a magic world of romance and pictured poetry ... a twilight world of dark mysterious woodlands, haunted streams, meads of deep green starred with burning flowers, veiled in a dim and mystic light."
- Novelist Mary Webb (then Mary Meredith), lived in childhood at The Grange just outside the town, on the Church Stretton road, from 1882 to 1896.
- Based on study of railway journeys and times, Michael Cobb argued in 1977 that Much Wenlock could have been a location setting for the fictional Shropshire town of Market Blandings in the writings of P.G. Wodehouse.
- Nearby is Wenlock Edge, an important geological feature. Both the Edge and the town are the subject of several poems by A. E. Housman in his work A Shropshire Lad, such as: "On Wenlock Edge the wood's in trouble..." and "Tis time, I think, by Wenlock town...". In 1909 six of these poems were set to music by Vaughan Williams as On Wenlock Edge, Song cycle for tenor and piano quintet.
- The 2012 Summer Olympics mascot, Wenlock, is named after the town in honour of WP Brookes and his Wenlock Olympian Society.
- Much Wenlock was host to an annual Poetry Festival, held the week-end after Easter. Its patron was Dame Carol Ann Duffy.
- The annual Live Arts Festival held during March is a section of Wenlock Olympian Games. There are competitions in music, creative writing and dance for young people aged 18 years and under.

=== Other notable people ===
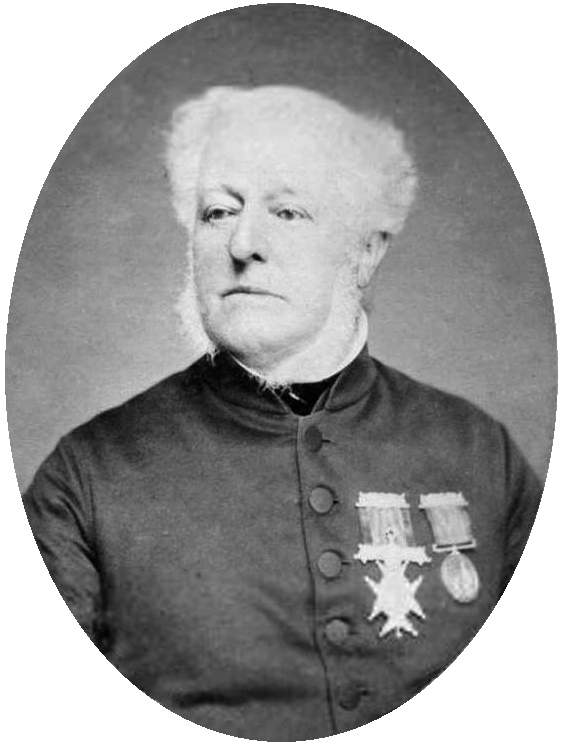
William Penny Brookes, 1875

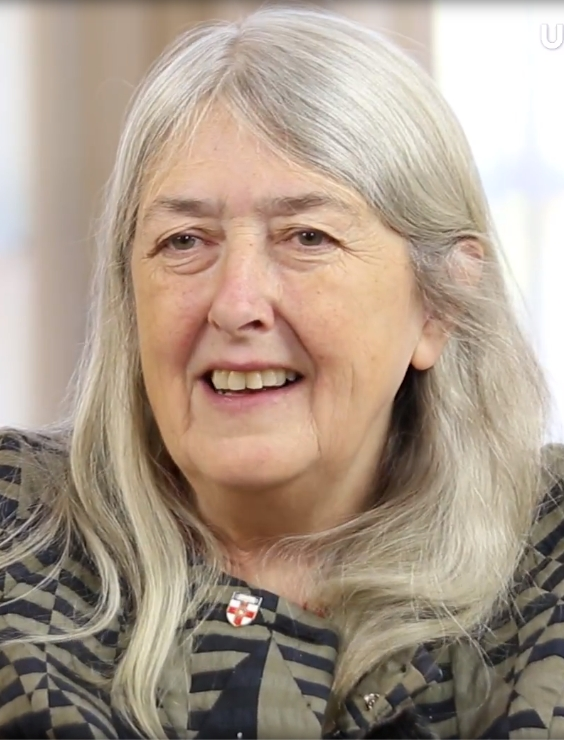
Mary Beard, 2017

- Mildburh (died 727), the Benedictine abbess of Wenlock Priory.
- Peter de Leia (died 1198), Bishop of St David's, Wales, was prior of Wenlock Priory.
- Isaac Hawkins Browne (1705–1760), politician and poet, MP for Much Wenlock from 1744 to 1754.
- William Penny Brookes (1809–1895), surgeon, magistrate, botanist; founder of the Wenlock Olympian Games
- David Cranage (1866–1957), Dean of Norwich, was curate at Much Wenlock parish church in 1898–1902.
- Beatrice Cutler (1861-1942) Matron, Much Wenlock Hospital 1902-1904.
- Mary Webb (1881–1927), a romance novelist and poet, brought up locally
- Rosemary Leach (1935 in Much Wenlock – 2017) English stage, television and film actress
- Tony Levin (1940 in Much Wenlock – 2011) was an English jazz drummer, who played at Ronnie Scott's Jazz Club in the 1960s
- Dame Rosemary Butler (born 1943 in Much Wenlock) politician and Presiding Officer of the National Assembly for Wales 2011 to 2016.
- Gabrielle Drake (born 1944) the actress, lives in Wenlock Priory
- John Constable (born 1952 in Much Wenlock) is an English playwright, poet, performer, activist and author
- Dame Mary Beard (born Much Wenlock 1955) an English scholar and classicist, the New Yorker characterises her as "learned but accessible"
- Roger Preece (born 1968 in Much Wenlock) footballer between 1986 and 2004, playing over 350 games mainly for Wrexham A.F.C. and Chester City F.C.
- Matthew Green (born 1970), Liberal Democrat politician, lived in Much Wenlock when he became MP for Ludlow from 2001 to 2005.
- Isobel Cooper (born Much Wenlock 1975), operatic pop soprano singer, known professionally as Izzy.

=== Films ===
- In 1950 the town and its surrounding countryside were the locations of the film Gone to Earth by Powell and Pressburger. In 1985 the film was fully restored by the National Film Archive, and premiered to great acclaim. The New Statesman review claimed the restored film to be... "One of the great British regional films" ...(and)... "one of the most beautiful films ever to be shot of the English countryside". The film was based on the 1917 novel of the same name by the Shropshire writer Mary Webb, which was partly inspired by the Diary of Francis Kilvert.
- The John Cleese film Clockwise was filmed partly in and around Much Wenlock.

== Schools ==
- Much Wenlock Primary School
- William Brookes School

== Media ==
Local news and television programmes are provided by BBC West Midlands and ITV Central. Television signals are received from either the Wrekin or Sutton Coldfield TV transmitters.

Local radio stations are BBC Radio Shropshire, Heart West Midlands, Capital North West and Wales, Smooth West Midlands, Hits Radio Black Country & Shropshire, and Greatest Hits Radio Black Country & Shropshire.

The town is served by the local newspaper, Shropshire Star.

== Transport ==
=== Bus ===
- The 436/7 bus service connects Much Wenlock with Shrewsbury, with the 436 also connecting the town with Bridgnorth. Both services operate hourly between 07:00 and 19:00. A less frequent service links the town to Telford.
- A Shropshire Hills Shuttle service at weekends and on Bank Holidays during the spring and summer started in 2012, but ceased in 2013. The route, called the "Wenlock Wanderer", connected the town with Church Stretton and operated mostly along the B4371 which runs atop the Wenlock Edge, before turning off to Acton Scott and then to Marshbrook and the market town of Church Stretton.

=== Rail ===
Much Wenlock used to be served by trains between Wellington and Craven Arms. The station became a terminus when through running southwards to Craven Arms ceased in 1951. The branch closed in 1962, just before Dr Beeching published his report.

The nearest National Rail stations are Shrewsbury, Wellington, and Oakengates, although Bridgnorth has a heritage railway to Kidderminster.

== Twin towns ==
Much Wenlock is twinned with Cysoing, Nord, France.
