= Wenlock Olympian Games =

Sporting event

- Wenlock Olympic Society Logo
- Status: Active
- Genre: Sports event
- Frequency: Annual
- Locations: Shropshire, England
- Years active: October 1850
- Founder: Dr William Penny Brookes
- Website: www.wenlock-olympian-society.org.uk

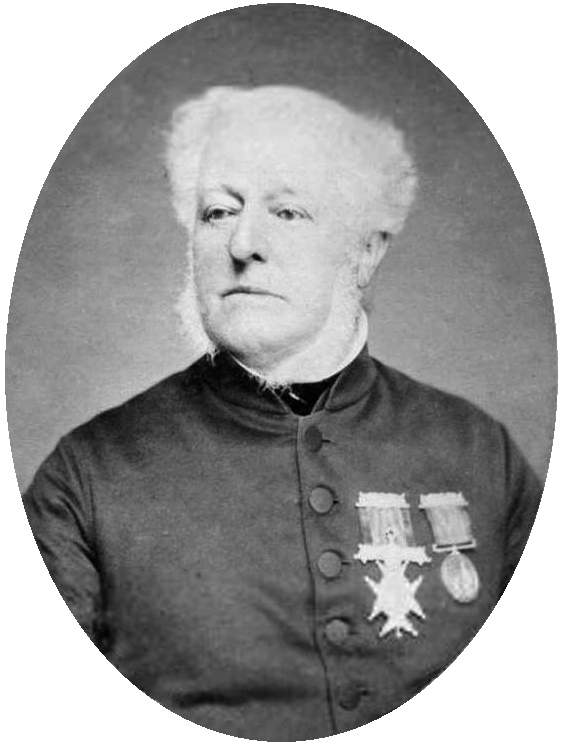
Dr William Penny Brookes, founder of the Wenlock Olympian Games

The Wenlock Olympian Games, dating from 1850, are a forerunner of the modern Olympic Games. They are organised by the Wenlock Olympian Society (WOS), and are held each year at venues across Shropshire, England, centred on the market town of Much Wenlock. One of the two mascots for the 2012 Summer Olympics was named Wenlock in honour of the Wenlock Olympian Games.

== History ==
On 25 February 1850 the Wenlock Agricultural Reading Society (WARS) resolved to establish a class called The Olympian Class – "for the promotion of the moral, physical and intellectual improvement of the inhabitants of the town and neighbourhood of Wenlock and especially of the working classes, by the encouragement of outdoor recreation, and by the award of prizes annually at public meetings for skill in athletic exercise and proficiency in intellectual and industrial attainments". The secretary of the class and driving force behind the Olympian Games was Dr William Penny Brookes who was inspired to create these events through his work as a doctor and surgeon in the sprawling borough of Wenlock which consisted mainly of Madeley, Broseley and Much Wenlock.

The first meeting was held at Much Wenlock racecourse on 22–23 October 1850. These first Games were a mixture of athletics and traditional country sports such as quoits, football and cricket. Events also included running, hurdles and cycling on penny-farthings. Some of the early Games included "fun events" such as the blindfolded wheelbarrow race and, one year (1851) an 'Old Women's Race' with the prize of a pound of tea.

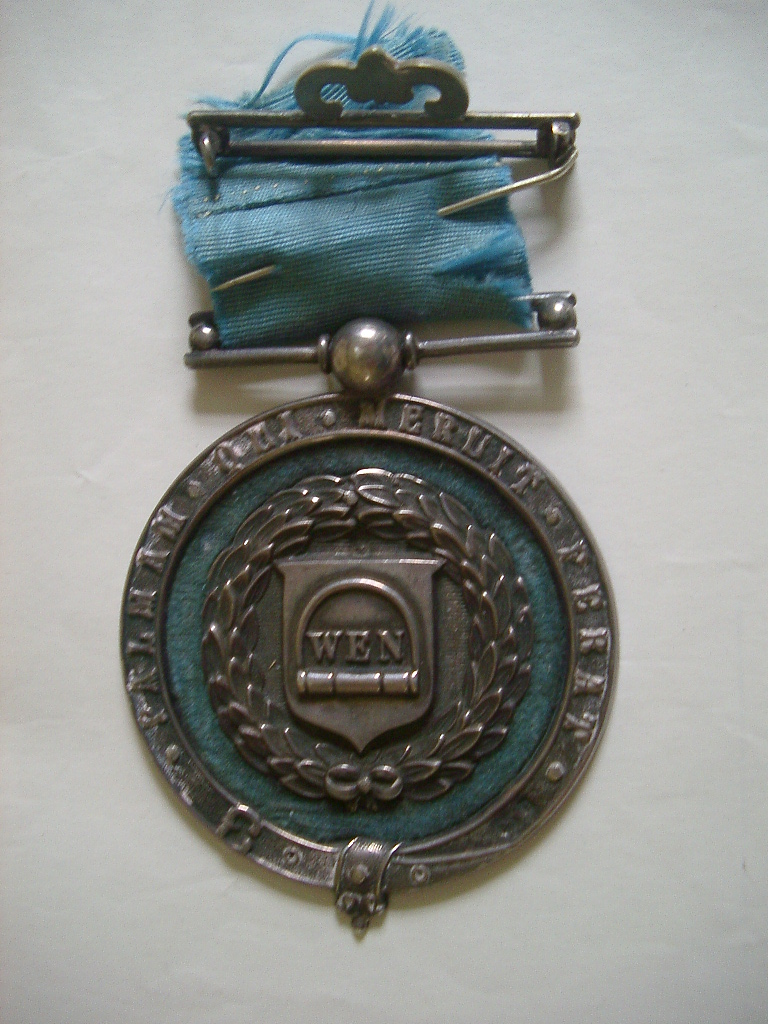
A silver medal from the 1864 Wenlock Olympian Games

In 1859, Wenlock Olympian Class sent £10 to Athens as a prize for the best runner in the Long Foot Race at the Zappas Olympics which was held in November that year – open only to Greek-speaking athletes. The Wenlock Prize, the largest prize on offer was won by Petros Velissarios of Smyrna (now İzmir) in the Ottoman Empire, one of the first international Olympians.

In 1860, Brookes introduced the Shropshire Olympian Games, with their first games held at Much Wenlock, despite 'vile weather'. Lieutenant Colonel Herbert Edwardes, who Brookes had invited to speak at the games, praised their founder and the WARS's work but disagreed with the Greek influence of the name 'Olympian' by publicly suggesting the games be called "'The Shropshire Class of British Work and Play', or anything else you will; but let it tell of English men and women, English boys and girls." Despite this the Olympian name stuck.

Following a dispute with WARS, in November 1860, the Wenlock Olympian Class separated from WARS and changed its name to Wenlock Olympian Society.

The first National Olympian Games were held in London in 1866 and were organised by the National Olympian Association (NOA) which had been co-founded by Brookes in 1865. The NOA ceased its operations in 1883.

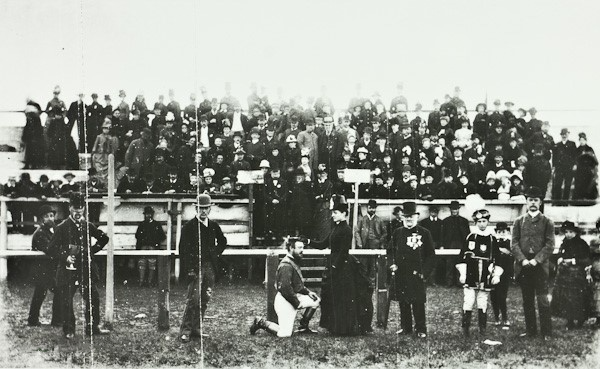
William Penny Brookes (with umbrella and medals, and standing next to a uniformed herald) at the 1887 Wenlock Olympian Games

Baron Pierre de Coubertin visited the Wenlock Olympian Society in 1890, which held a special festival in his honour. He was inspired by Dr Brookes and went on to establish the International Olympic Committee. Brookes was named as an honorary delegate at the 1894 Sorbonne Congress at which the IOC was established, although he was unable to attend due to ill health. The Wenlock Olympian Games continued intermittently after his death in 1895, with significant revivals in 1950 and 1977. The current series has been running since 1977, and has received official recognition from the IOC and the British Olympic Association (BOA), exemplified by visits from the Princess Royal for the BOA in 1990 and Juan Antonio Samaranch for the IOC in 1994.

The mascot for the London 2012 Summer Olympics was named Wenlock after Much Wenlock where the Wenlock Olympian Society and its Games began. The 2012 Summer Paralympics mascot was named Mandeville in honour of Stoke Mandeville Hospital, where the Paralympian Games originated.

The medals awarded featured Nike, the Greek goddess of victory, as do Olympic medals.

Following the unexpected death of President Roy Rogers, triple jump world record holder and Olympic gold medallist Jonathan Edwards, CBE, was elected President of the WOS in 2011.

== Events ==
140th Games was held in June and July 2026.

In 2017 the games included the following:

- Archery
- Athletics
- Badminton
- Fencing
- Junior Biathlon
- Kwik Cricket
- Half Marathon
- Netball
- Road Race
- Schools Hockey
- Tennis
- Triathlon
- Volleyball
- Live Arts, open to school age participants, consisting of the following:

Area	Awards
Music	Instrumentalist of the year Vocalist of the year
Speech and Drama	Verse speaking Reading for performance Creative verse writing Acting solo/Duo
Dance	Ballet; Modern; Tap; Cabaret; Song and dance Classical; Lyrical; Acrobatic

== See also ==
- International Olympic Committee – Governing body of Olympic sports
- British Olympic Association
- Cotswold Olimpick Games – Annual celebration of sports and games
- Shin-kicking – English combat sport
- Robert Dover (Cotswold Games) – English attorney, author and wit
